= Parliament Building (Quebec) =

Seat of the Parliament of Quebec

- Hôtel du Parlement du Québec (French)
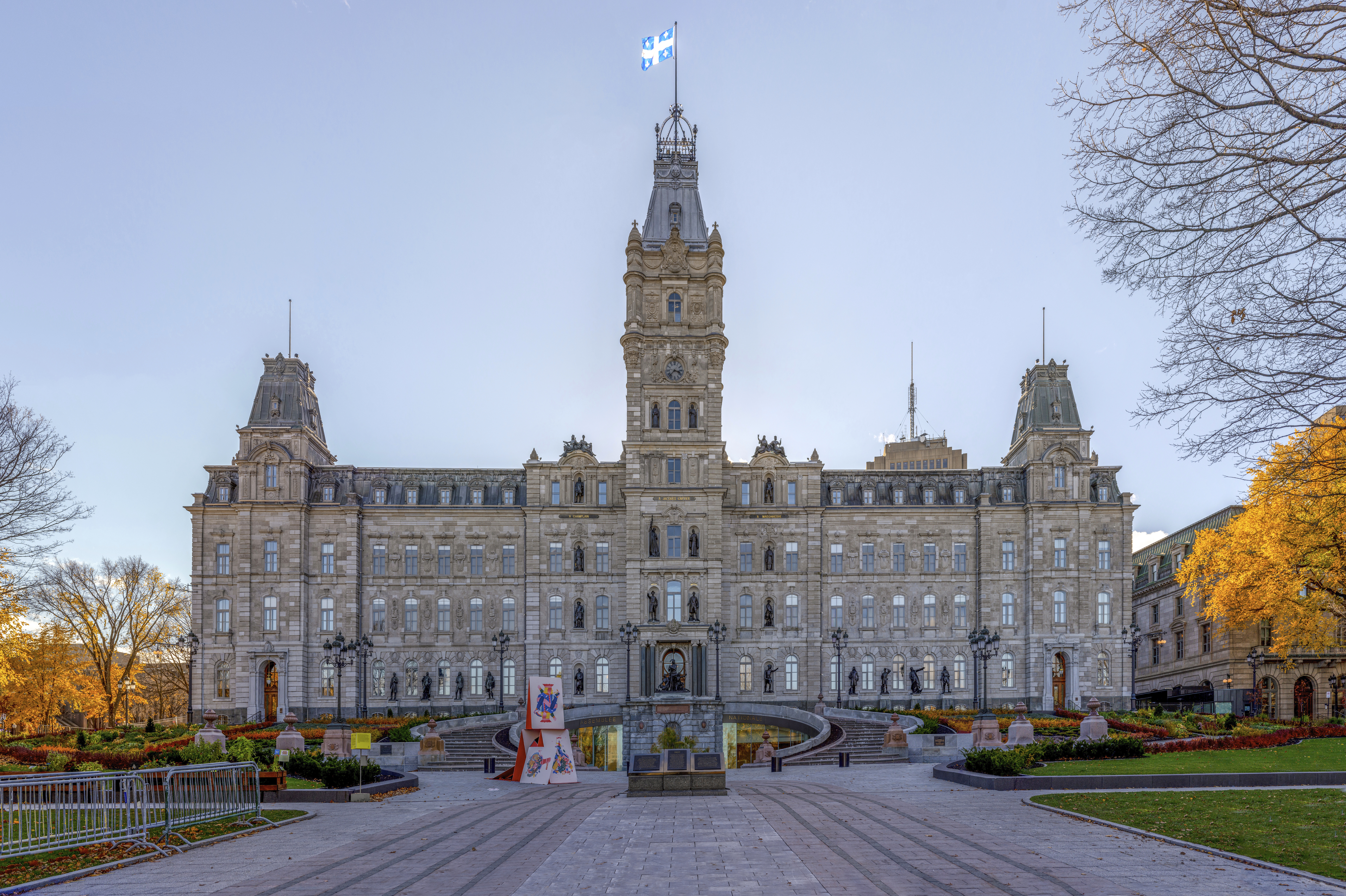
- Parliament Building in 2020
- Interactive map of the Parliament Building area

General information
- Architectural style: Second Empire
- Location: 1045, rue des Parlementaires, Quebec City, Quebec, Canada
- Coordinates: 46°48′31″N 71°12′51″W
- Construction started: 1877; 149 years ago
- Completed: 1886; 140 years ago
- Client: Crown in Right of Quebec
- Owner: Crown in Right of Quebec

Height
- Height: 52.4 m (172 ft)

Design and construction
- Architect: Eugène-Étienne Taché

The Parliament Building of Quebec (French: Hôtel du Parlement du Québec, pronounced [otɛl dy paʁləmɑ̃ dy kebɛk]) (Note: This is the official name; it is also sometimes referred to as French: Hôtel du Parlement de Québec see here and here.) is an eight-floor structure in Quebec City, Quebec. It is home to the National Assembly of Quebec (Assemblée Nationale du Québec). The Parliament Building was designed by architect Eugène-Étienne Taché in a Second Empire style and built between 1877 and 1886, in the heart of Parliament Hill. The National Assembly (or, as it was called until 1968, the Legislative Assembly) first met there on 27 March 1884, even though the building was only fully completed two years later, on 8 April 1886. From the 1910s to the 1930s, the government built several adjacent buildings to expand its office spaces, creating a parliamentary complex, of which the Parliament Building is the main edifice. This structure is a successor of several earlier buildings, the earliest of which was built in 1620 and among which there were two other parliament houses that served as legislatures.

Geographically, the building is in the Place de l'Assemblée-Nationale, in the district of Vieux-Québec–Cap-Blanc–Colline Parlementaire, part of the borough of La Cité-Limoilou, just outside the walls of Old Quebec. However, the Parliament Building, along with several adjacent buildings and terrain, have been declared a national historic site (site historique national), and as such taken away from the control of the provincial Ministry of Culture and Communications and municipalities. This designation notwithstanding, the province of Quebec is signatory to a long-term leasing deal (called emphyteusis) when it comes to the territory in front of the Parliament Building, that is, from the front entrance to the fortifications of the old town, as this parcel has belonged to the federal government since 1881.

== History ==
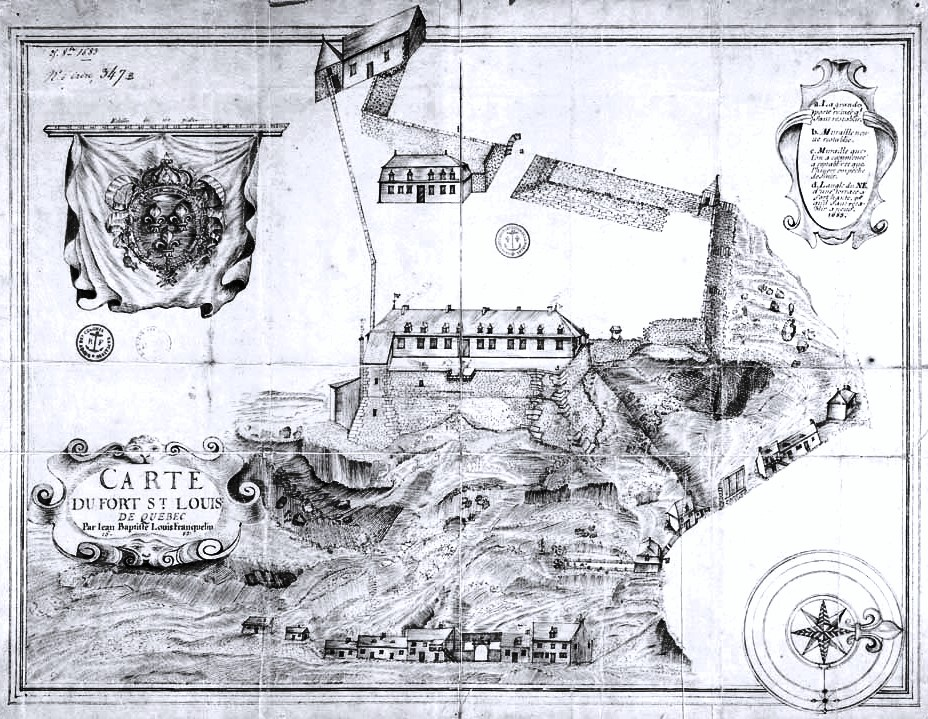
A 1683 drawing of the Château Saint-Louis, the earliest precursor to the Parliament Building

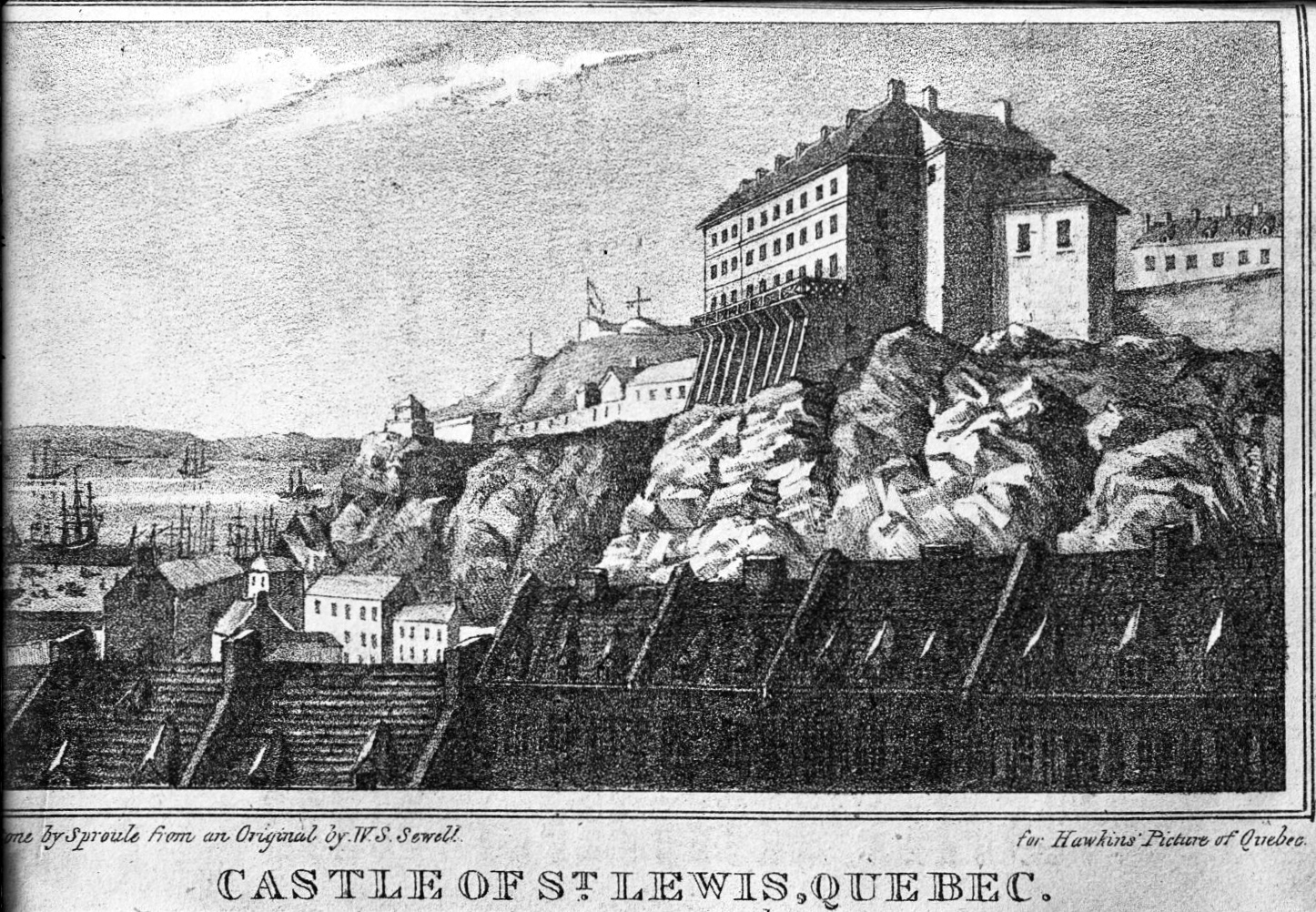
Château Saint-Louis just prior to being destroyed by fire.

=== Precursors ===
==== Fort and château Saint-Louis ====
In 1620, Samuel de Champlain was ordered to stop further exploration of New France, of which he was lieutenant governor, and instead was asked to engage solely in administration of the newly discovered lands. He therefore ordered the construction of a fort on Cap Diamant, the easternmost extremity of the Promontory of Quebec. Even as the short-lived governments of the Company of Rouen and of the Company of Montmorency were substituted for a more stable Company of One Hundred Associates in 1627, it was not until 1648 that the one-storey Château St. Louis, built by Governor Charles de Montmagny, became the first permanent official residence of the government of New France. However, by late 1680s, the construction was in a very poor state.

A bigger residence on the foundations of the old one was built in 1694 by Governor Frontenac, and was finished thirty years later. The château was damaged during the Seven Years' War, but after some repairs, still remained a residence for government structures of the British administration, until Château Haldimand was built. A large fire destroyed the 1694 building in 1834. The site is today covered by the Terrasse Dufferin, in front of the Château Frontenac.

==== Château Haldimand ====
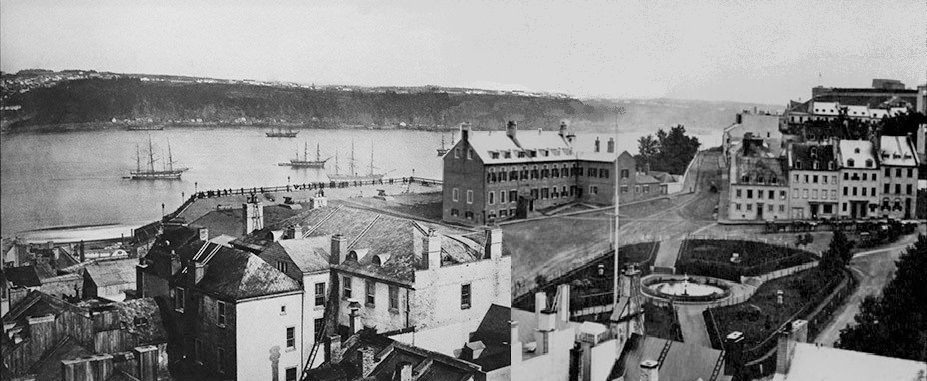
Château Haldimand in 1864

In 1784, the governor of the Province of Quebec, Frederick Haldimand, ordered the construction of a new building, which was completed three years later. It was a residence of the colonial government from 1786 to 1791, and then of the governors only, until 1811. The Château Clique, which had an outsized influence over Quebec's governance, met there regularly with the governor. Château Haldimand was demolished in 1892 to make way for the construction of the Château Frontenac.

==== Old Parliament Building ====
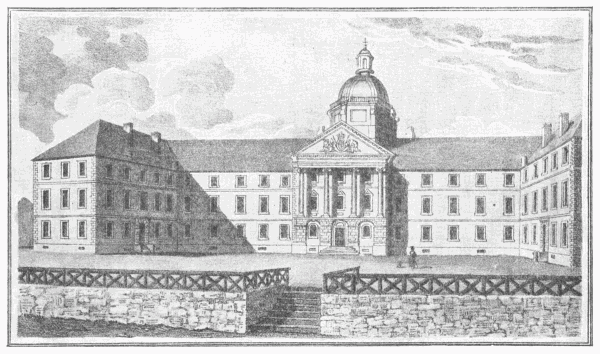
The Old Parliament Building

The Old Parliament Building was built in 1693-1695 by the bishop of the diocese of Quebec, Jean-Baptiste de La Croix de Chevrières de Saint-Vallier, as the seat for the bishopry, and is also therefore known as the Episcopal Palace of Quebec. However, its purpose was changed in 1777, when the government of the province of Quebec started renting the building from the Catholic Church. The Legislative Council, which was a largely advisory body, was seated there.

Following the division of the old Province of Quebec into Lower Canada and Upper Canada by the Constitutional Act 1791, Quebec stayed as the capital of Lower Canada. It was at that time that the Canadas first received Westminster-style parliaments. In Lower Canada, the building that hosted the parliament, consisting of the Legislative Assembly and the Legislative Council, lower and upper houses respectively, was that building. It also hosted the office of the governor. The first sitting of parliament, after some reconstruction works, took place on 17 December 1792.

The government attempted to gain ownership of the property from the Roman Catholic Church. After several unsuccessful attempts of negotiation with the archbishop, Bernard-Claude Panet, he eventually agreed to transfer the ownership rights in 1831 – thus the building became colonial property in August 1832. It was subsequently rebuilt for the expansion of the government offices.

After the Lower Canada Rebellion of 1837–1838, the parliament was suspended, and the governor-appointed Special Council sat in Montreal. The Episcopal Palace was then briefly seat of the Parliament of the Province of Canada in 1852–1854, but it was fully destroyed in a fire on 1 February 1854. Other victims were the museum of the Literary and Historical Society of Quebec and half of the collection of the parliamentary library. The area that used to be the Episcopal Palace is now part of Parc Montmorency.

==== Post office ====
With the Old Parliament Building destroyed, the legislature was left with no building to operate in. They quickly accepted the offer of the Sisters of Charity to rent their convent as a temporary seat of parliament. But on 3 May 1854, during works on repurposing the building, another fire ruined the new wing of the house they intended to use as a meeting place for the legislature. They afterwards rented a courthouse and a music hall as an emergency solution, until in 1858, the city acquired the land with the ruins of the Old Parliament Building (it later became the Champlain Market). The proceeds were then used to construct a small building first intended as a post office, but then it was decided to move the legislature and the government in that place. The Canadian legislature presided in the office from 1860 to 1865, and, after Confederation, the provincial parliament occupied the building from 1867 to 1883, when it succumbed to a fire.

=== Construction of the current building ===
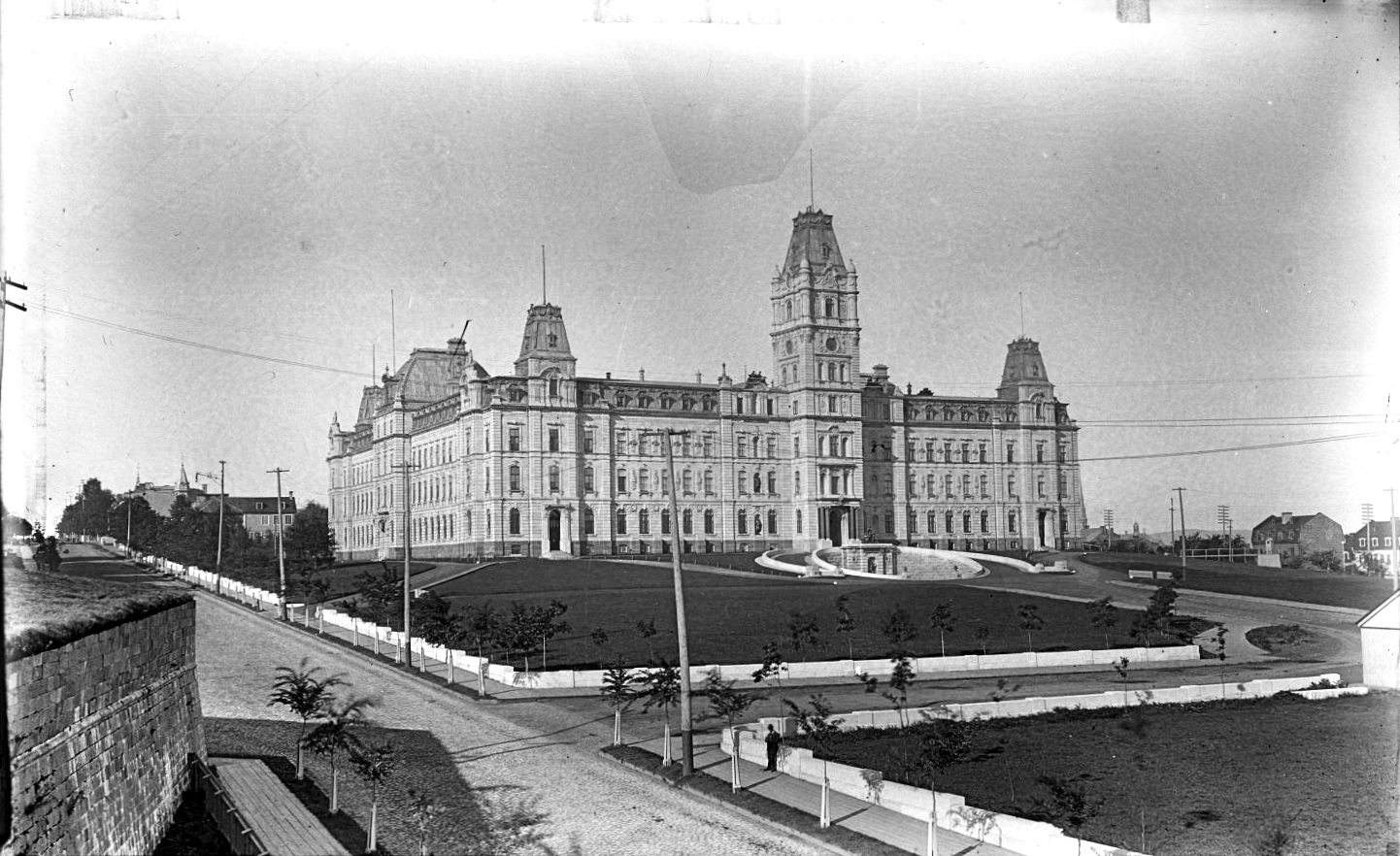
Newly opened Parliament Building, c. 1890

The government sought a bigger place to operate, in one building, thus the government proposed to build a new site in 1869. For this purpose, it bought lands that were occupied by a Jesuit college and demolished it in 1872. It also bought a parcel of land from the federal government in July 1876 for that purpose, and it is on these two lots of land that the new building, which was to host the government (including ministries), the legislature and the lieutenant governor's office, was constructed.

The design works were assigned to Eugène-Étienne Taché, an architect who was then working at the provincial ministry of public works. He chose to build a new seat for government and parliament in a building with a style harkening back to the French Renaissance, instead of the British-style architecture in Ottawa. Due to budget constraints, however, the building's Second Empire architecture was toned down somewhat from what was popular in Paris; it was nevertheless called a "construction of the century", with up to 400 workers employed to erect the seat of parliament.

The building process itself was marred with problems. Simon-Xavier Cimon, the entrepreneur who won the contract to build the Parliament Building, was deeply unpopular. The workers, whose wages went down from 60¢ to 50¢ in 1878, went on strike, demanding they be paid twice the sum. With tensions escalating, the employment of strikebreakers failing and the then Premier of Quebec, Henri-Gustave Joly, attacked on the street, the demonstrations were suppressed by the military in June 1878. In total, three more strikes occurred by the time the whole complex was built. After making minor concessions, the construction continued, so that by 1880, three wings of the building were completed. The legislature still met in the post office building.

The second stage was started in 1883, after the parliament lost its operating space due to a fire, so they temporarily moved to the then-existing rooms of the Parliament Building, displacing some government offices. Members of the Legislature started their first legislative session in the new building on 27 March 1884. The builders also faced other problems – in October 1884, a bombing damaged the construction site, and the government also experienced significant cost overruns. Despite that, the main construction was finished in time for the parliamentary session that started on 8 April 1886.

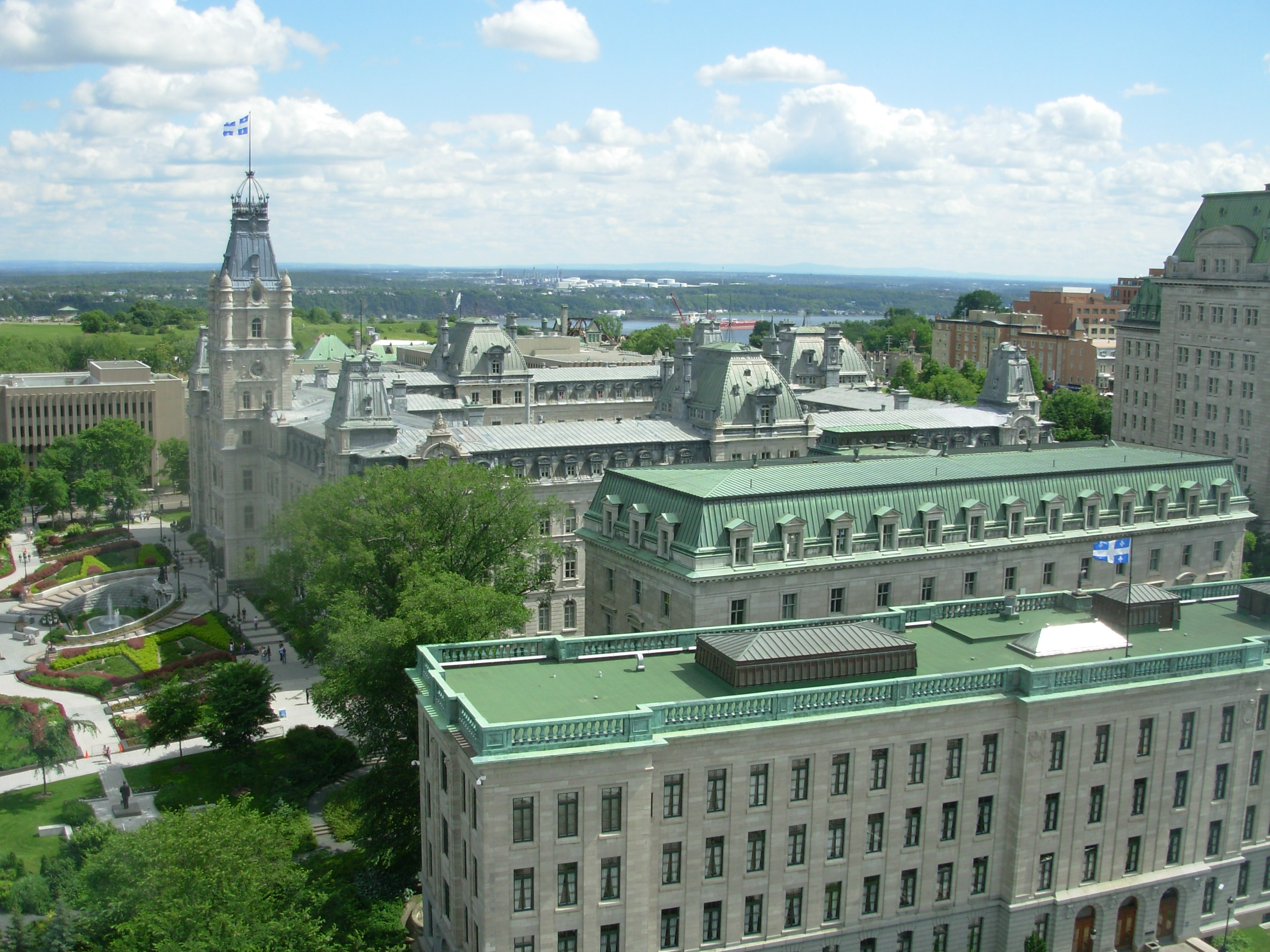
Side view of the Parliament Building complex

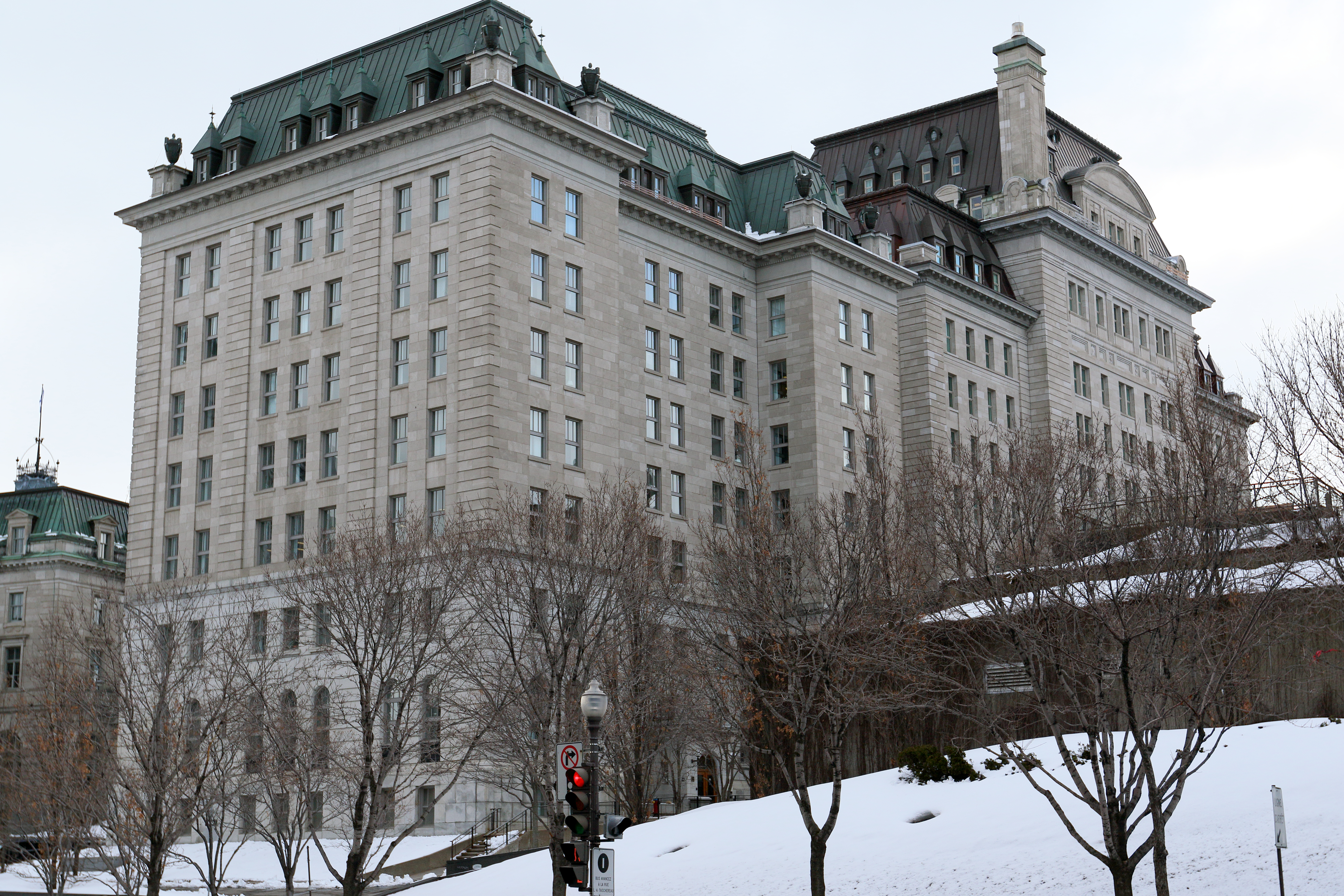
Édifice Jean-Antoine-Panet

=== Following inauguration ===
After its opening, most of the works concerned the decorations of the building and around it. In 1888, a clock at the top of the tower was installed. Two years later, a fountain in front of the entrance, dedicated to the Abenaki, was inaugurated. Four years after that, statues of various political and intellectual figures of importance to Quebec were mounted in niches in the walls of the building.

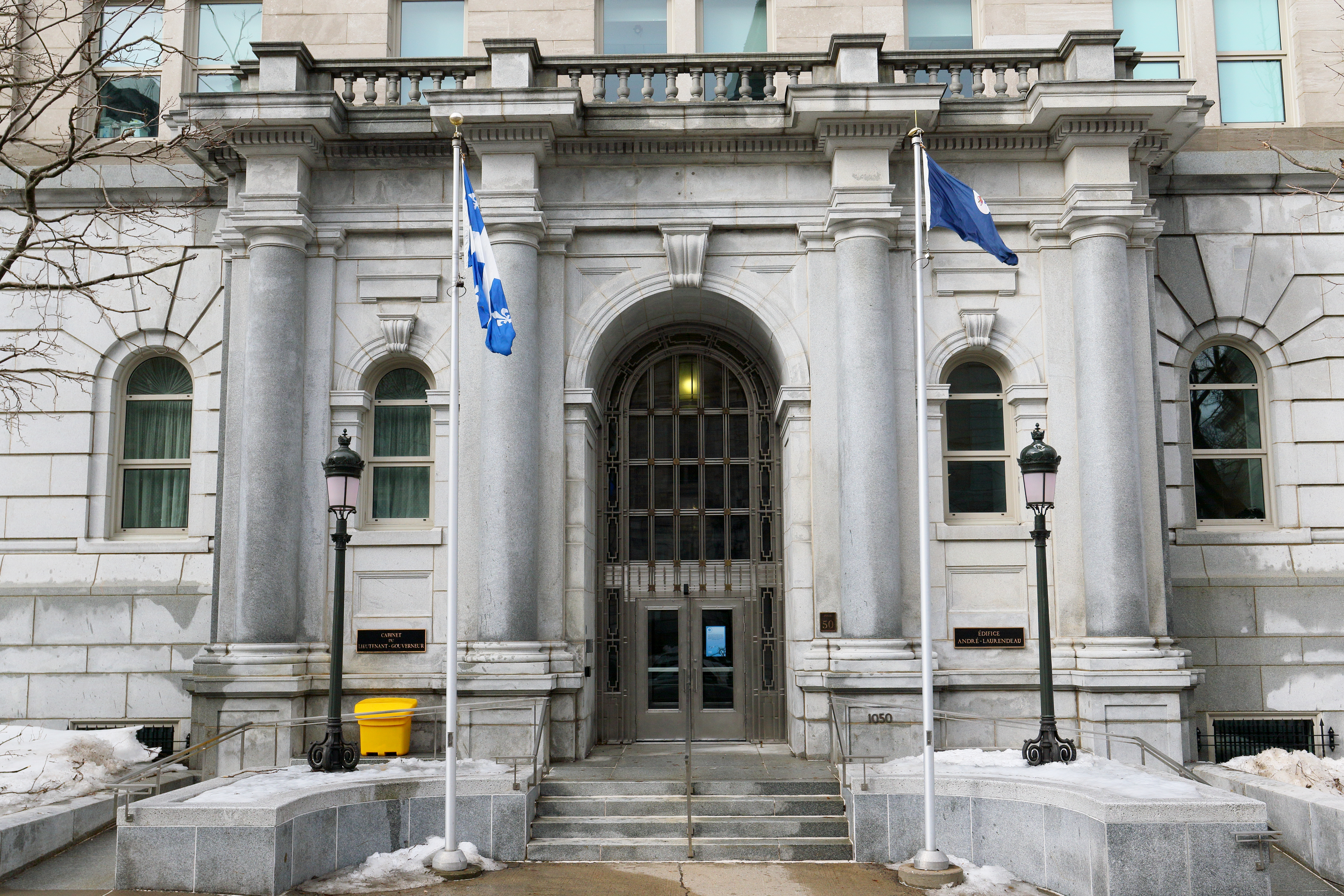
Entrance to the Édifice André-Laurendeau, one of the four buildings that were later added to the parliamentary complex

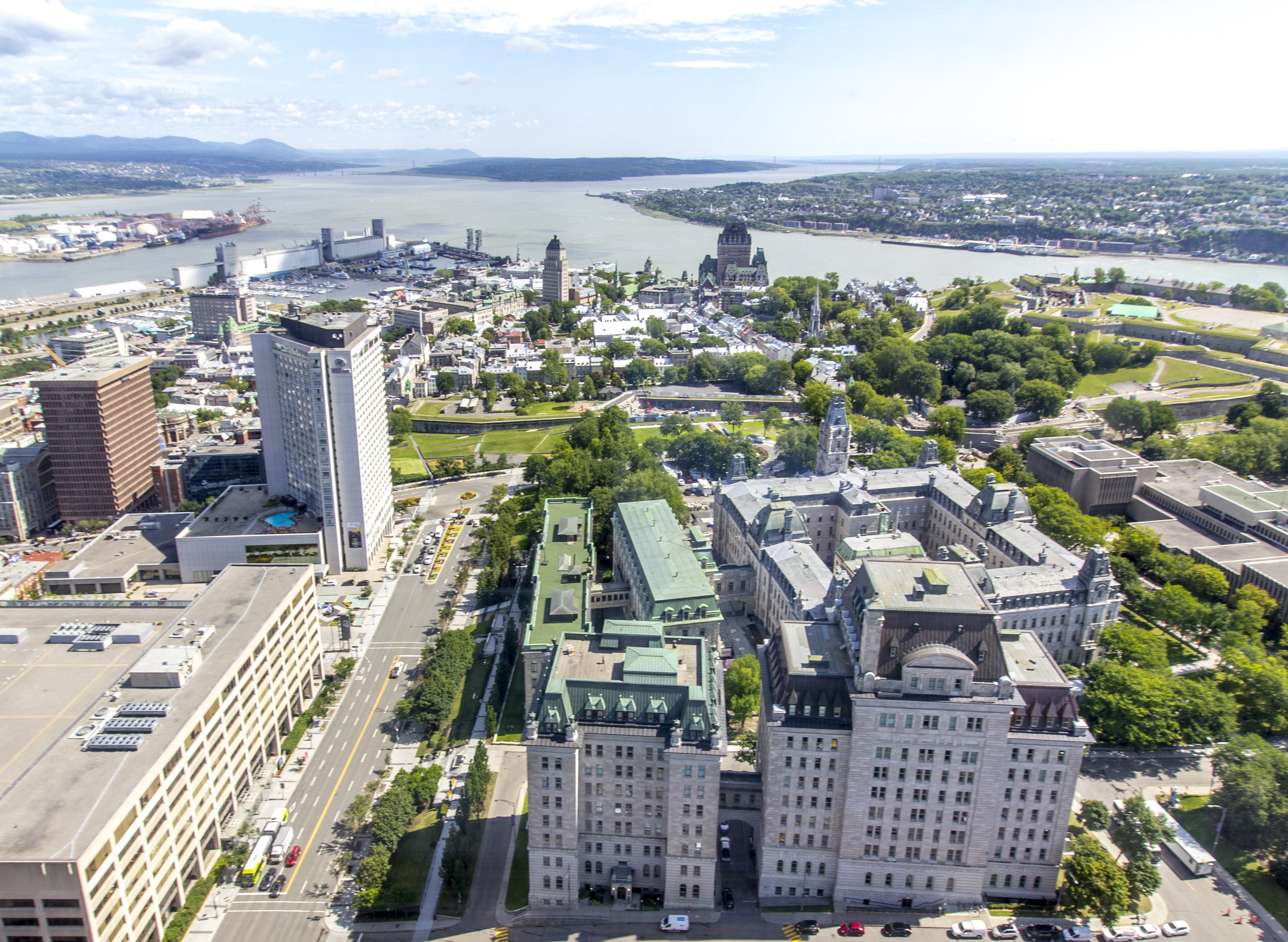
A view of the Parliament Building complex on Quebec City's skyline

The building initially hosted all major executive and legislative offices of the province of Quebec as well as the parliamentary library. However, by the turn of the century, the government decided to expand their working spaces and moved some of their offices to adjacent structures. The first was Édifice Pamphile-Le May, which was added in 1910–1915 to host the Library of the National Assembly. It was also at that time that a parliamentary restaurant, Le Café du Parlement, was opened in the courtyard (renamed Le Parlementaire in 1970). A decade later, the Édifice Honoré-Mercier was built to house several ministries, including the office of premier, which was in the building from its construction until 1972 and from 2002 on. Édifice Jean-Antoine-Panet and Édifice André-Laurendeau were erected in the 1930s, for the Ministry of Transport and Ministry of Agriculture, respectively. The latter building is now the main office of the lieutenant-governor.

In 1985, the Parliament Building, along with several adjacent buildings and terrain, were declared a national historic site (site historique national). As such, it taken away from the control of the provincial Ministry of Culture and Communications, and municipalities, to ensure operational independence. This was reaffirmed during changes to the law in 2011, though the term was changed to national heritage site (site patrimonial national).

In 2016-2019 a new entrance with enhanced security and additional space for parliamentary committees were built for $60.5 million.

== Exterior ==
=== Overview ===
The eight-storey Parliament building is symmetrical and is composed of three parts. There are two side wings each with a small tower, one dedicated to Samuel de Champlain, explorer and founder of Quebec City, and the other to Paul Chomedey de Maisonneuve, founder of Montreal; and a 52-metre-tower placed between these two wings, which, in its turn, is named after Jacques Cartier, who made first contact between the French and what is now Canada. The concept of decorations as thought by Eugène-Étienne Taché was to show an open history of Quebec on the wall of parliament, including statues and the heraldry. Until 2019, the main entrance was the original one, which could be accessed through either staircase going around greenery and a fountain with the statues of indigenous people; since then, however, the parliament is mainly accessible through a modernized space going through underground passages to the parliament, and the greenery was removed.

=== Statues ===
The front wall of the parliament building houses a total of 26 statues, which were ordered in 1886 and delivered in 1894 from Louis-Philippe Hébert and eight other sculptors, all from Paris. Two of the statues represent allegorical themes (Religion and Country and History and Poetry) and are on either side of the tower; another two represent the indigenous people of Quebec (in this case, the Abenaki), while the rest honour important people in the history of Quebec. Most of them are in the niches in the Parliament Building's outer wall. Samuel de Champlain's statue, as well as the History and Poetry allegorical statues are not shown here.

Statues on the façade of the Parliament Building
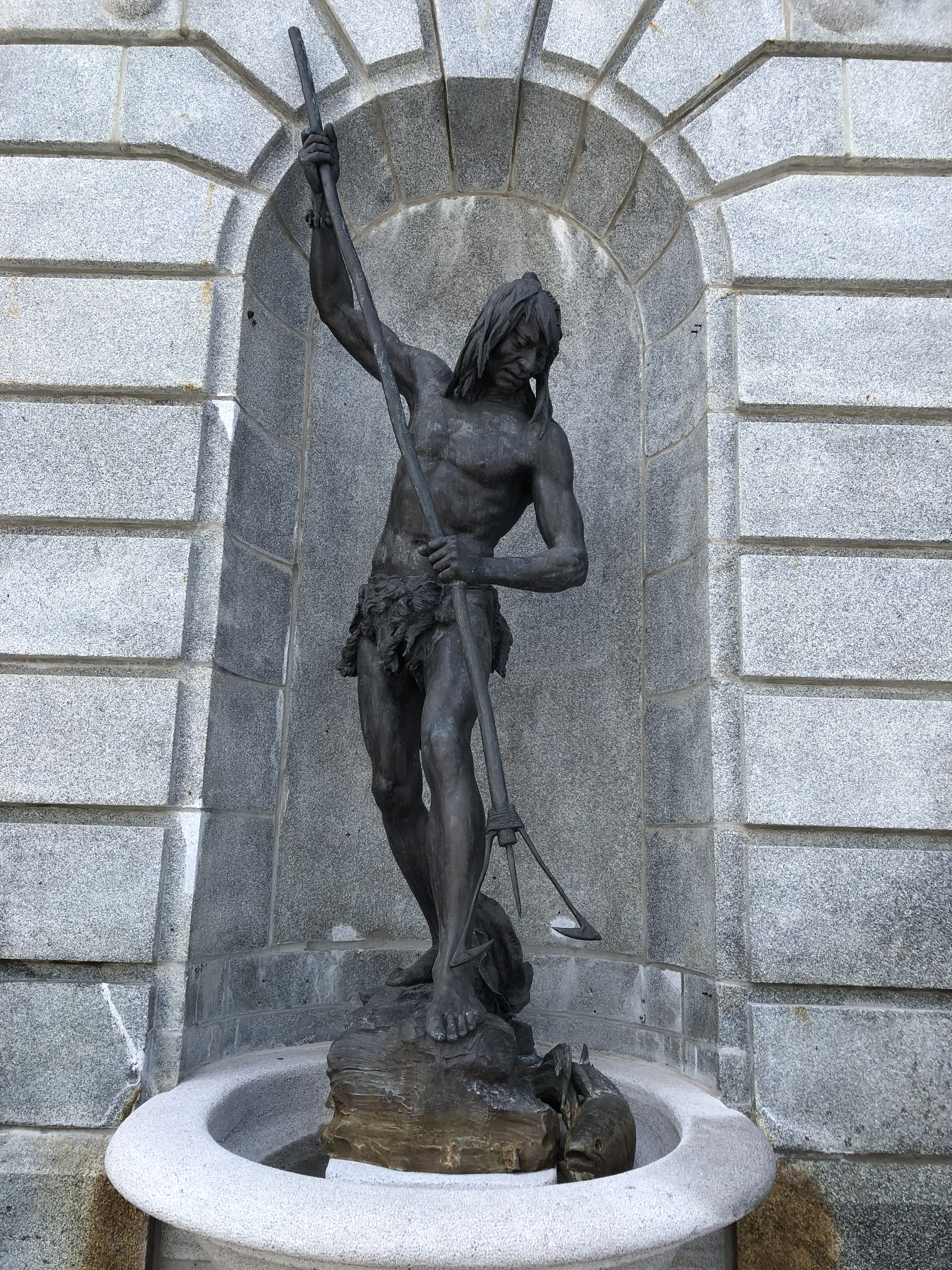
The Nigog Fisherman

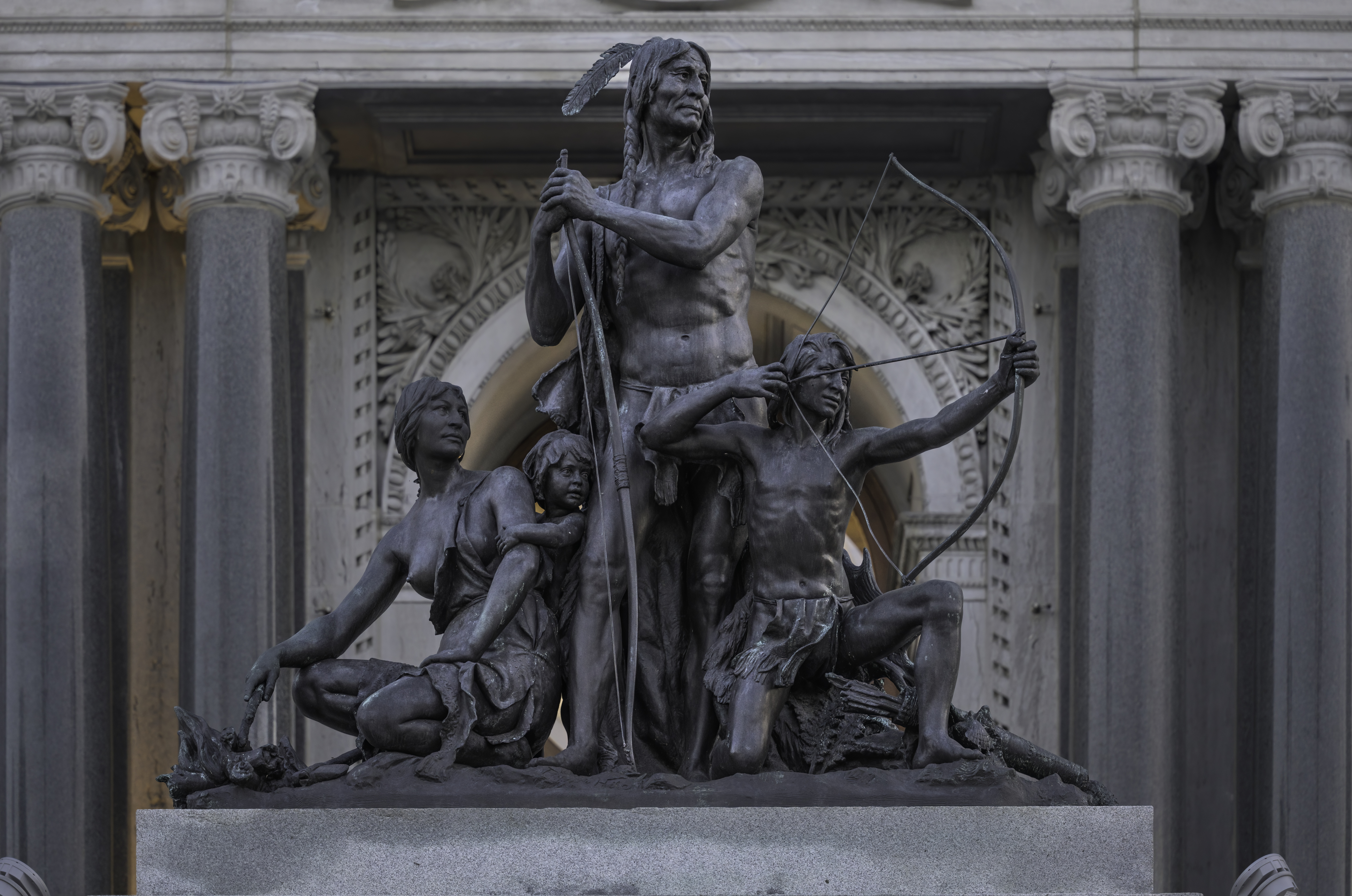
A Halt in the Forest

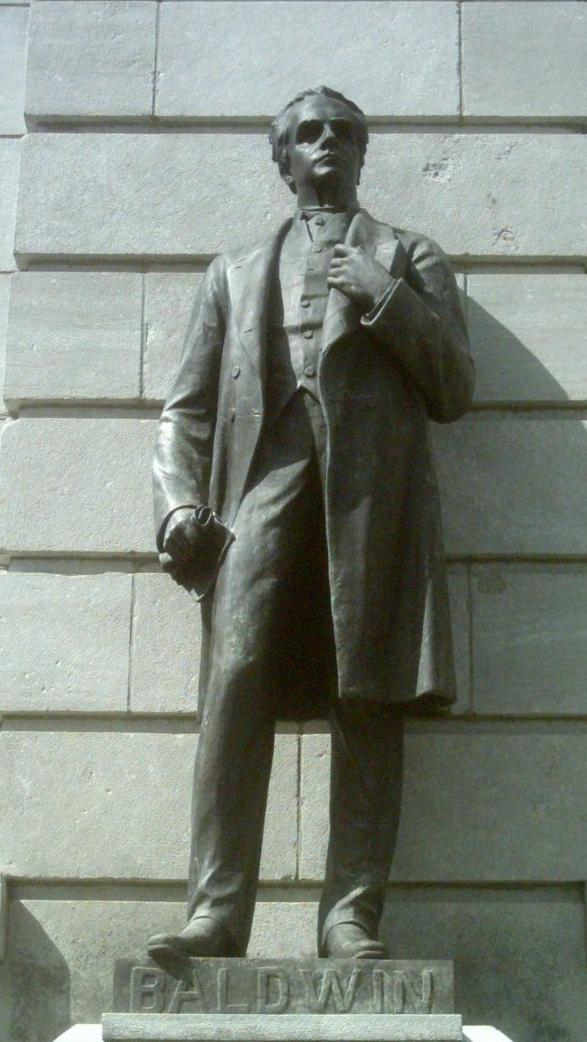
Robert Baldwin

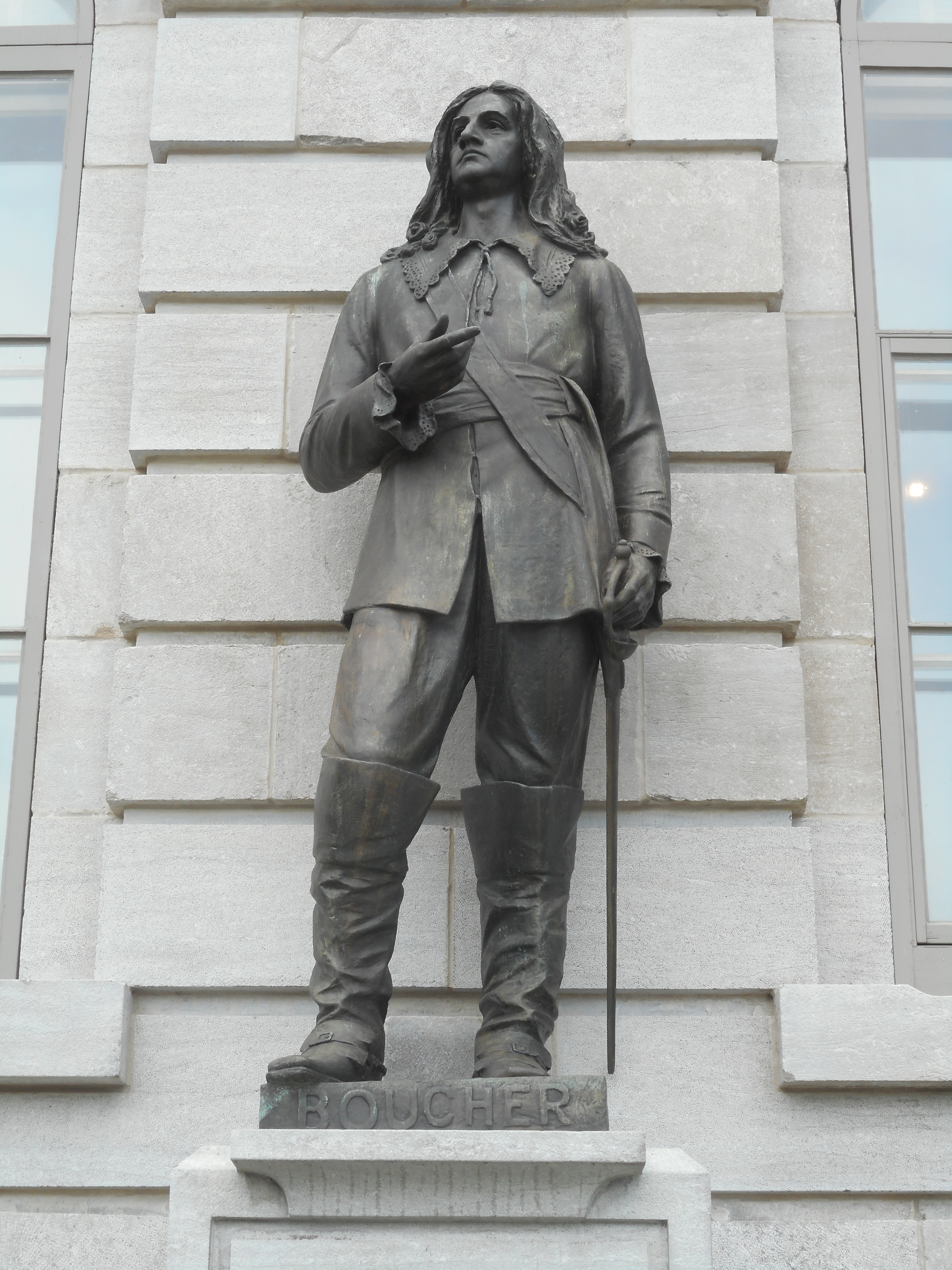
Pierre Boucher

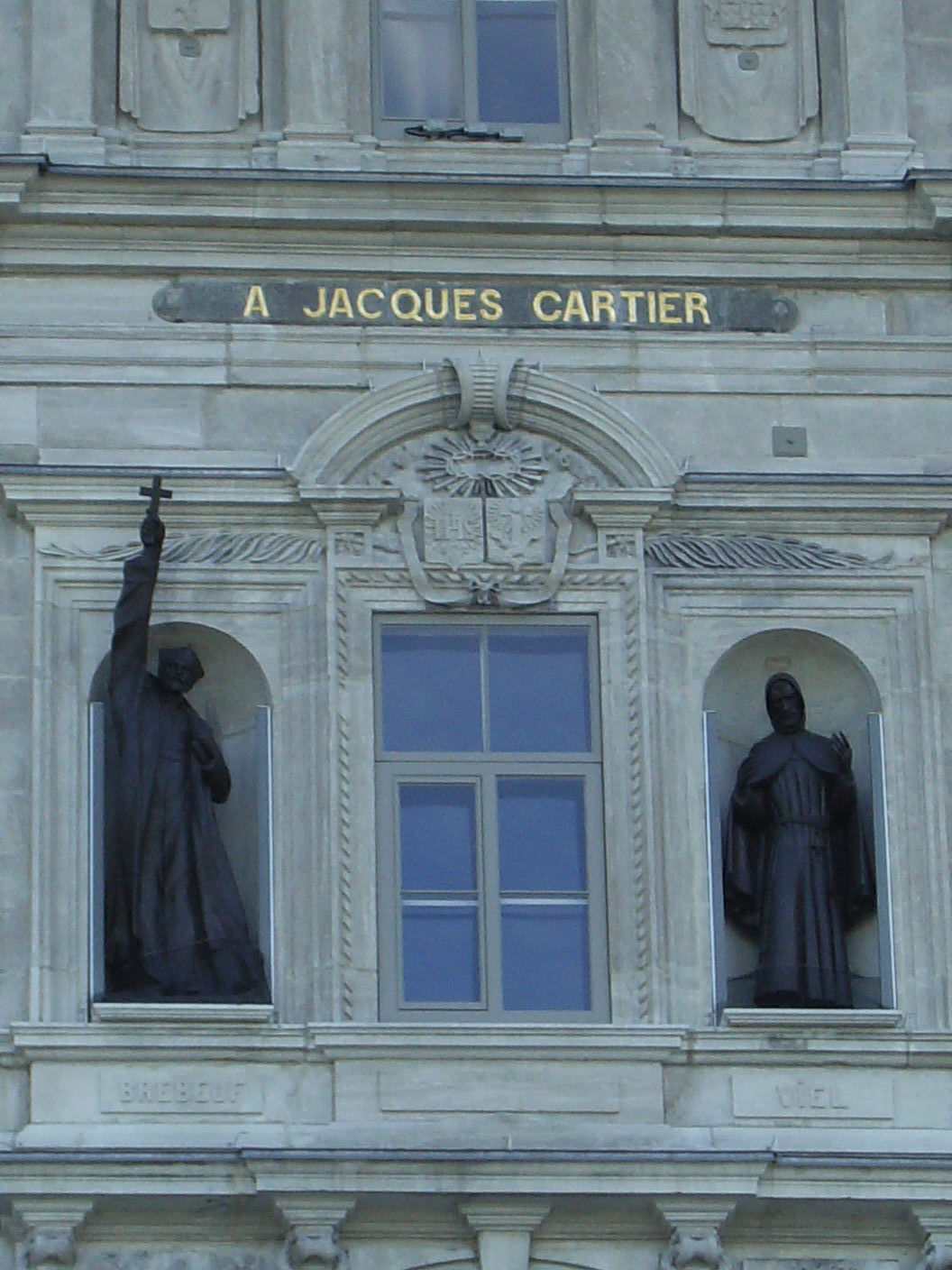
Jean de Brébeuf and Nicolas Viel

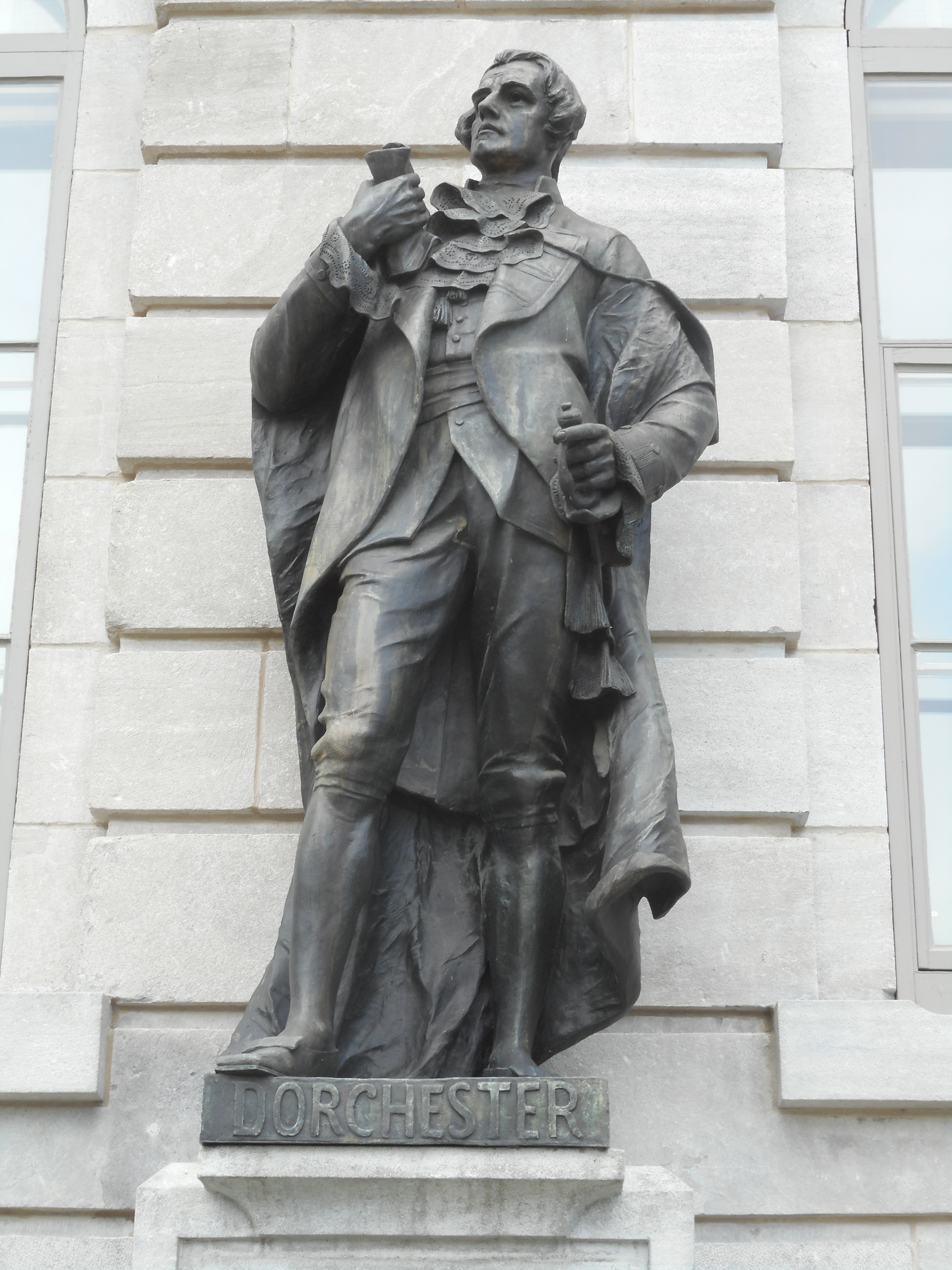
Guy Carleton, Lord Dorchester

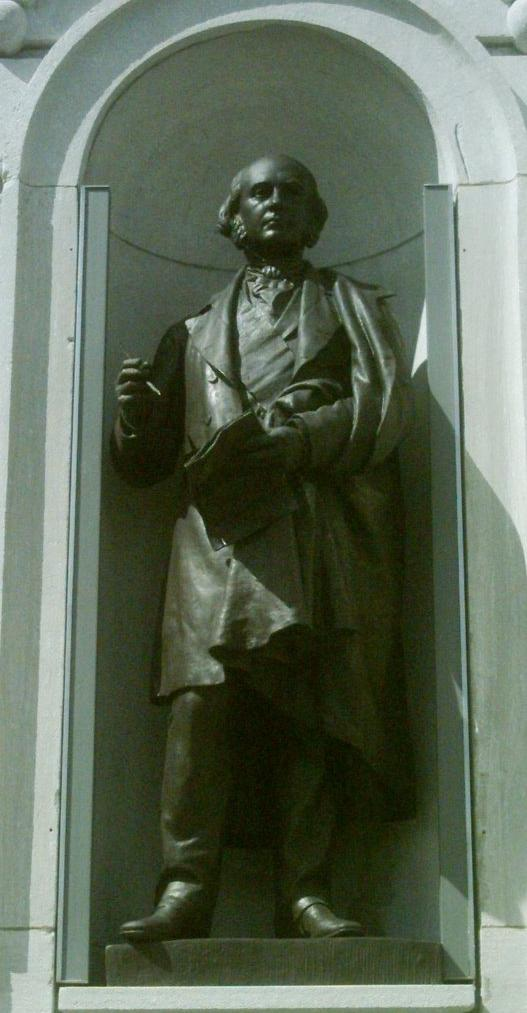
James Bruce, 8th Earl of Elgin

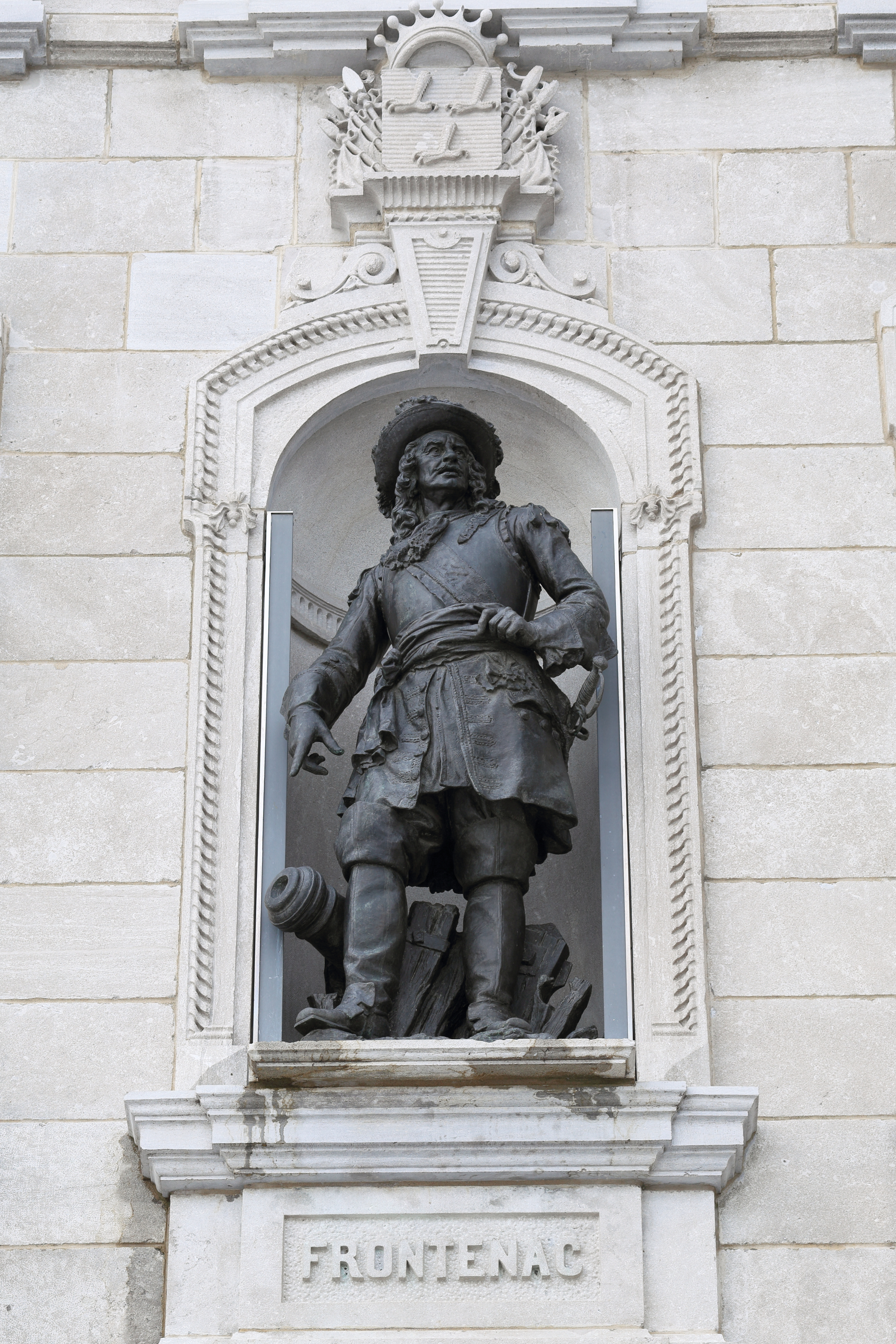
Louis de Buade de Frontenac

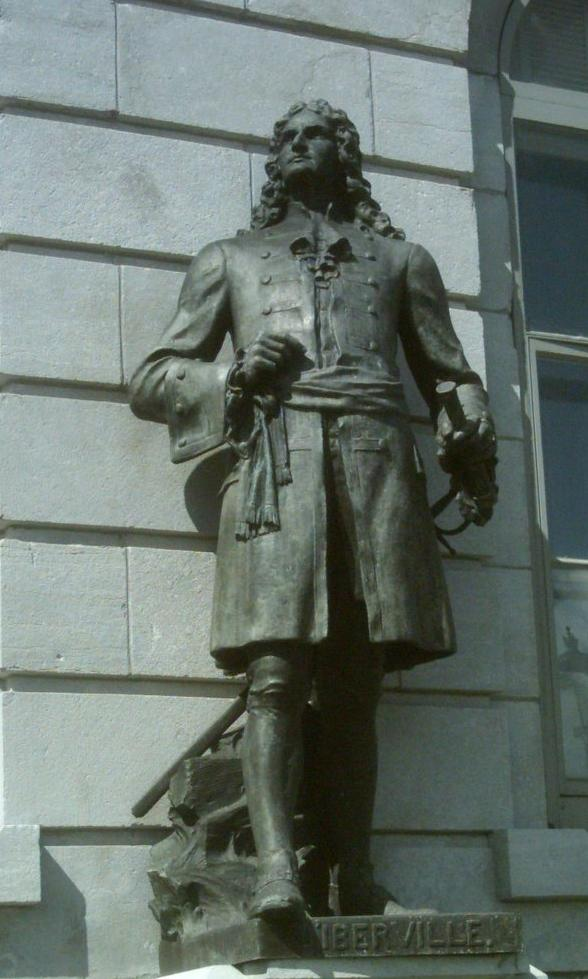
Pierre Le Moyne Sieur d'Iberville

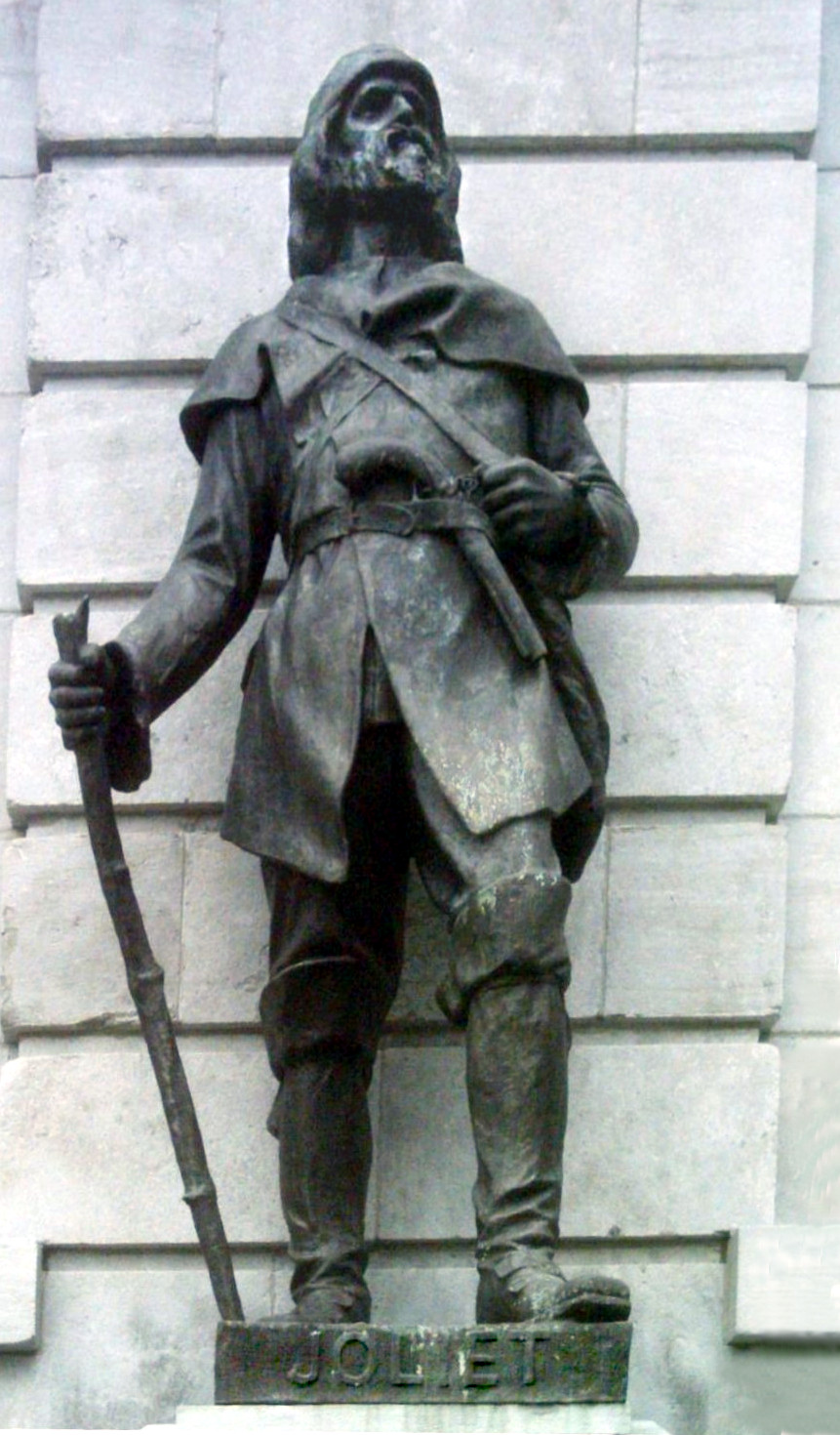
Louis Jolliet

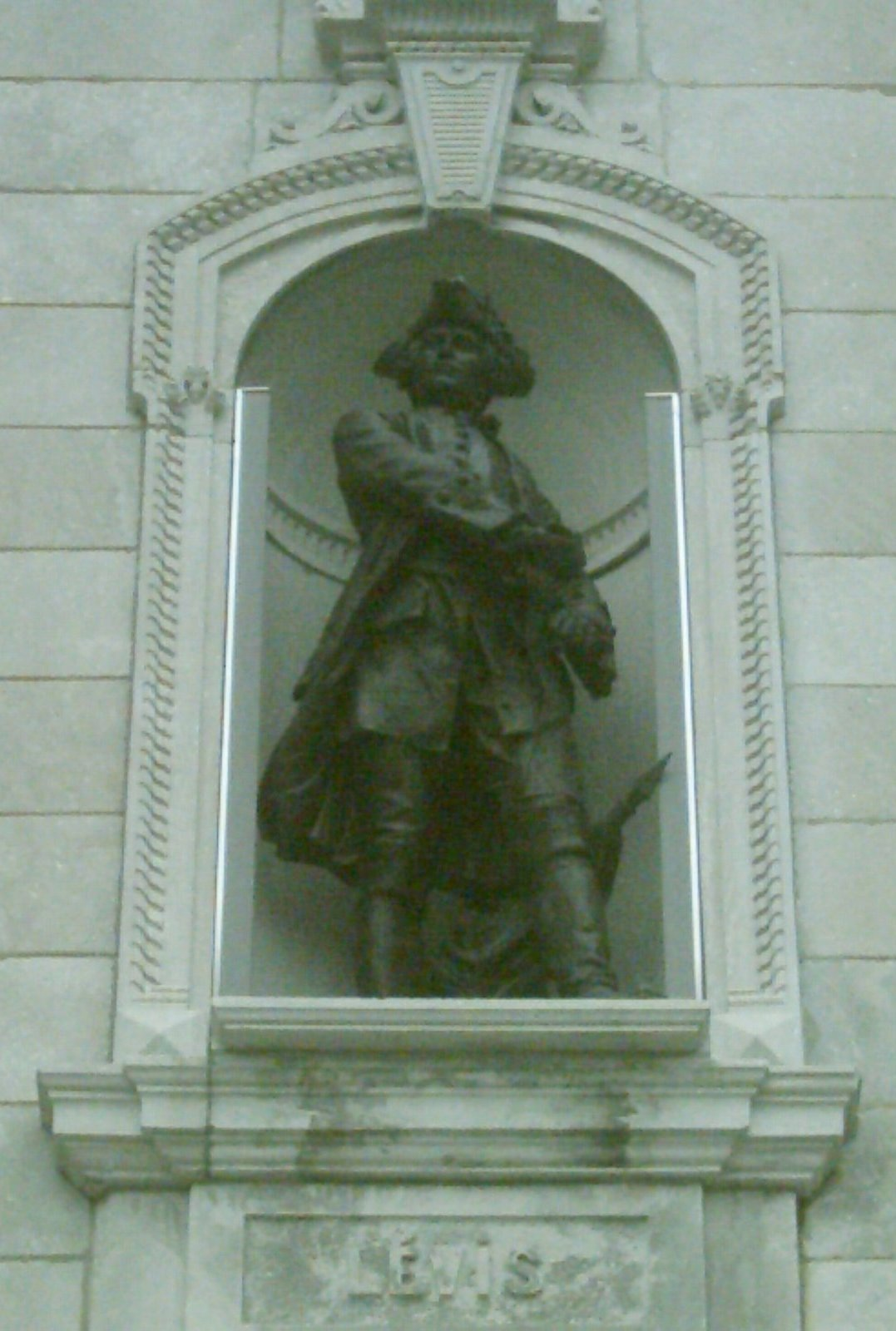
François Gaston de Lévis

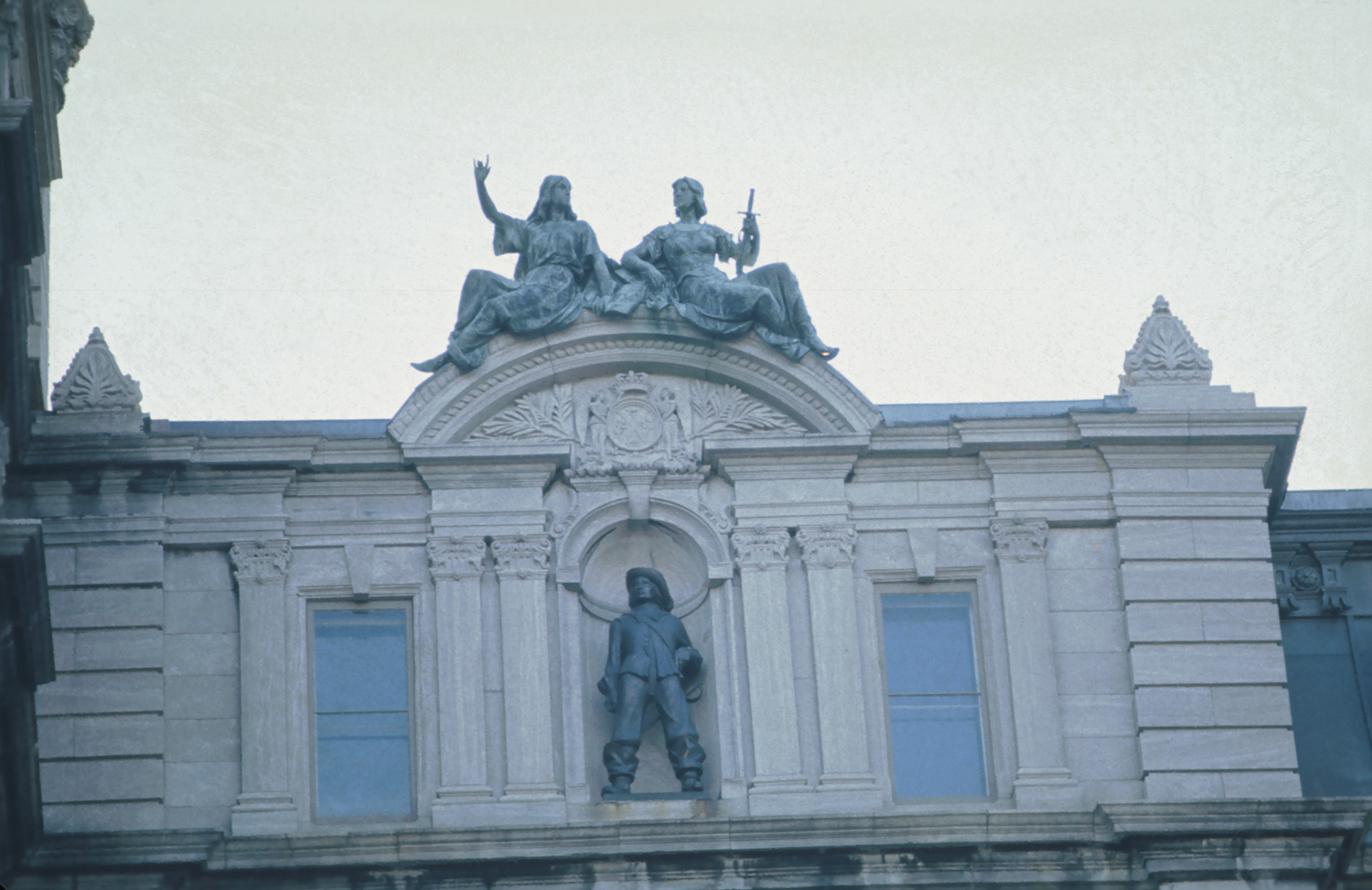
Paul Chomedey de Maisonneuve (below) and the allegorical statues of Religion and Country (above)

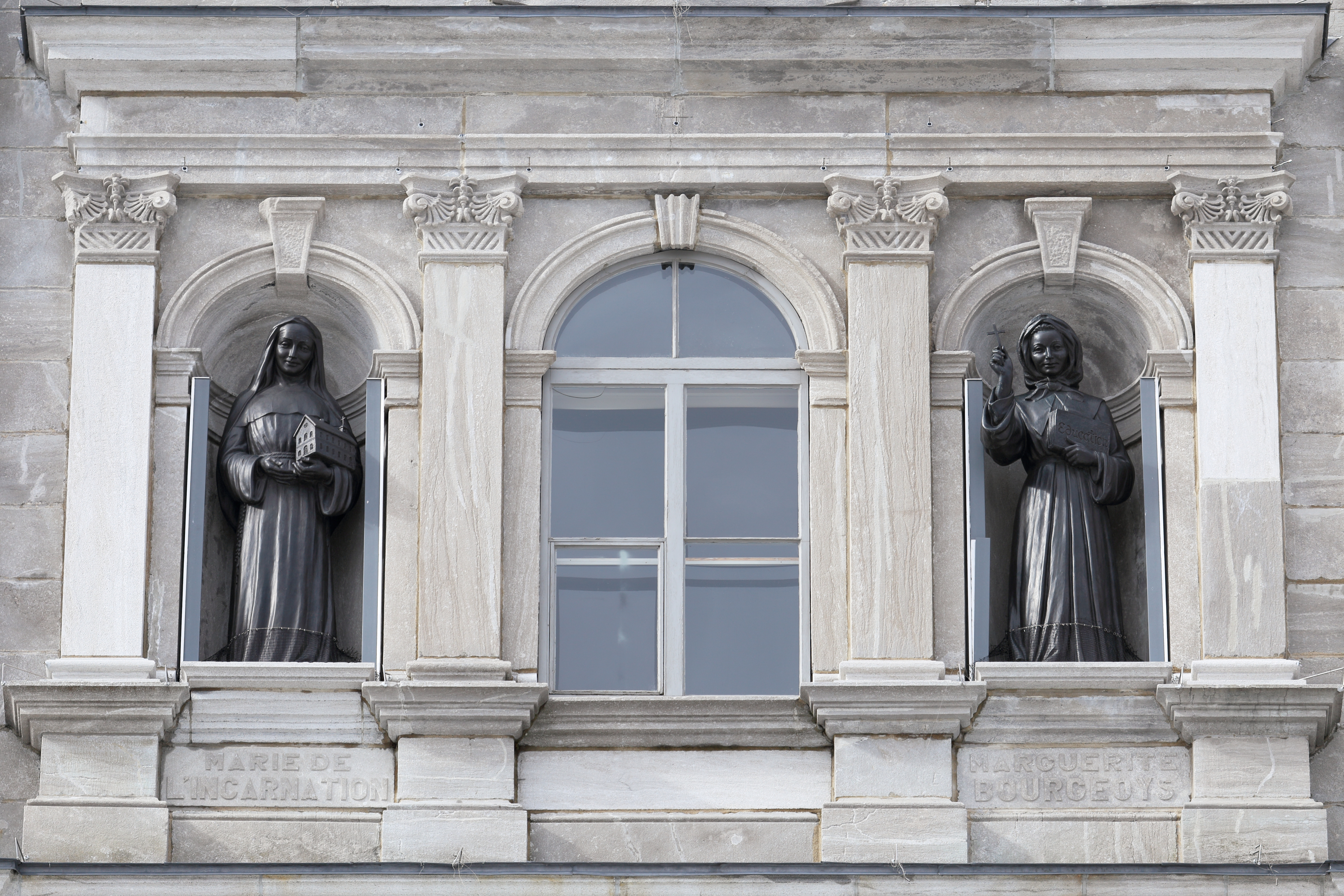
Marie of the Incarnation (left) and Marguerite Bourgeoys (right)

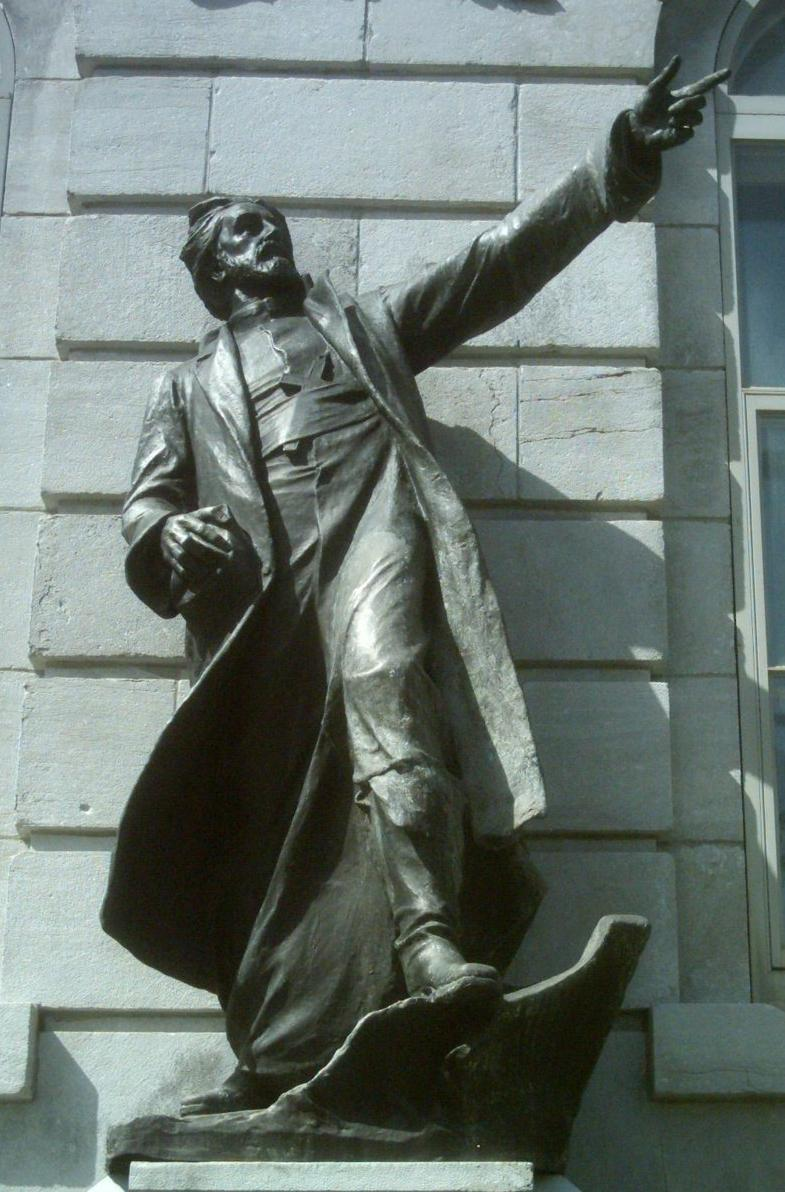
Jacques Marquette

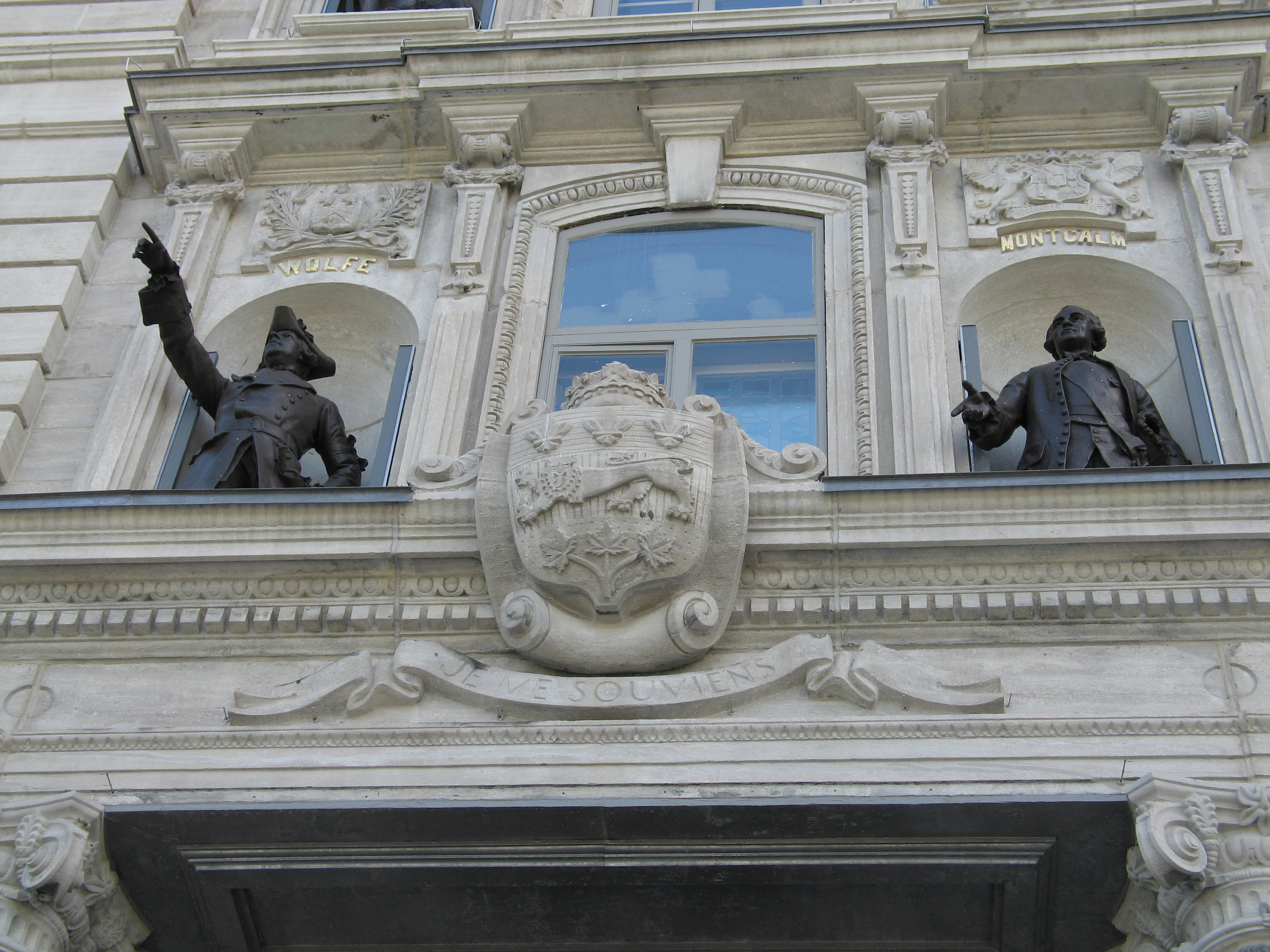
James Wolfe (left) and Marquis de Montcalm (right)

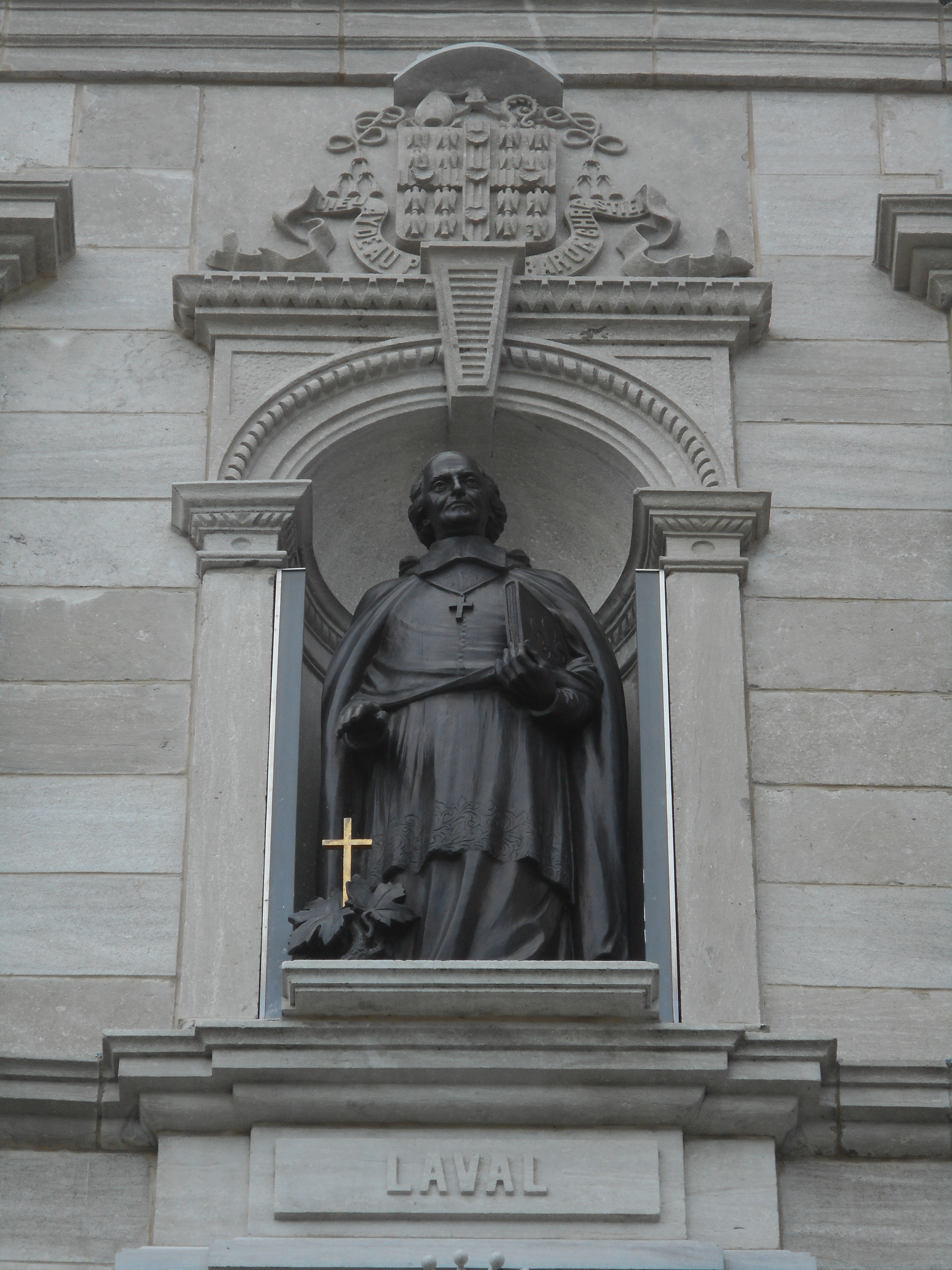
François de Montmorency

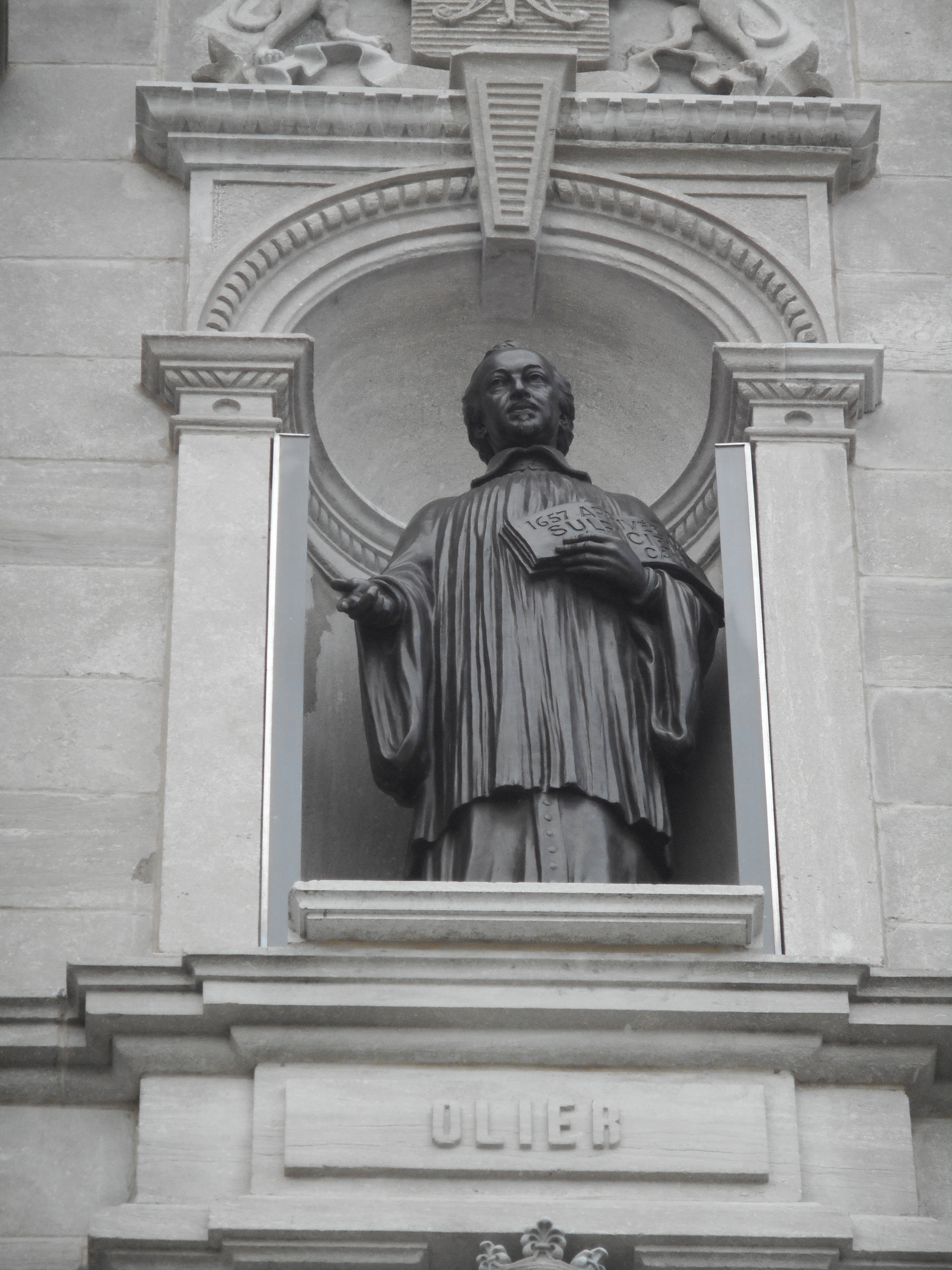
Jean-Jacques Olier

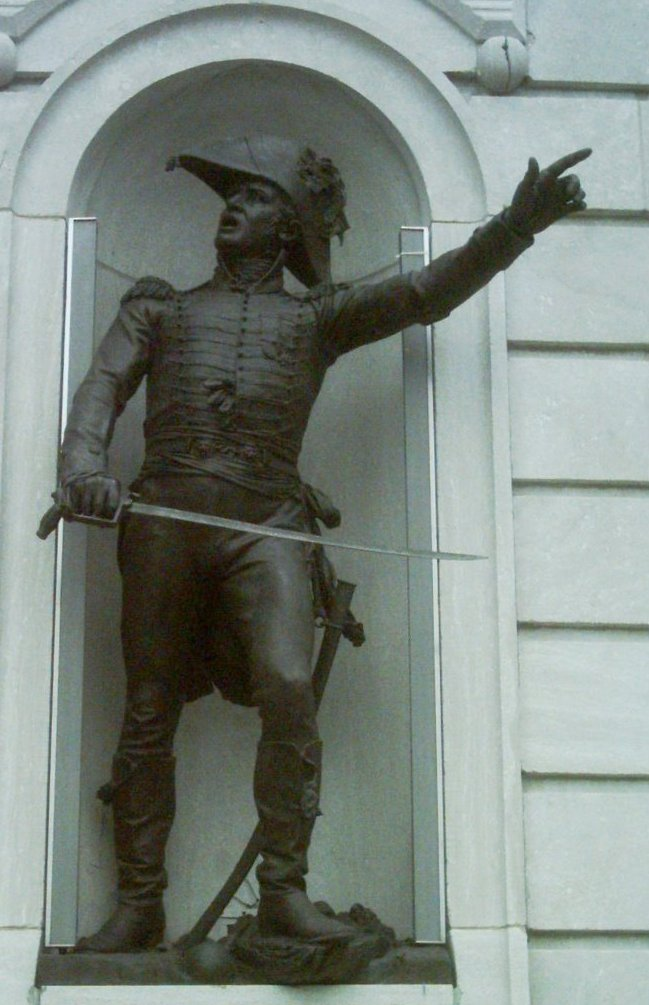
Charles-Michel de Salaberry

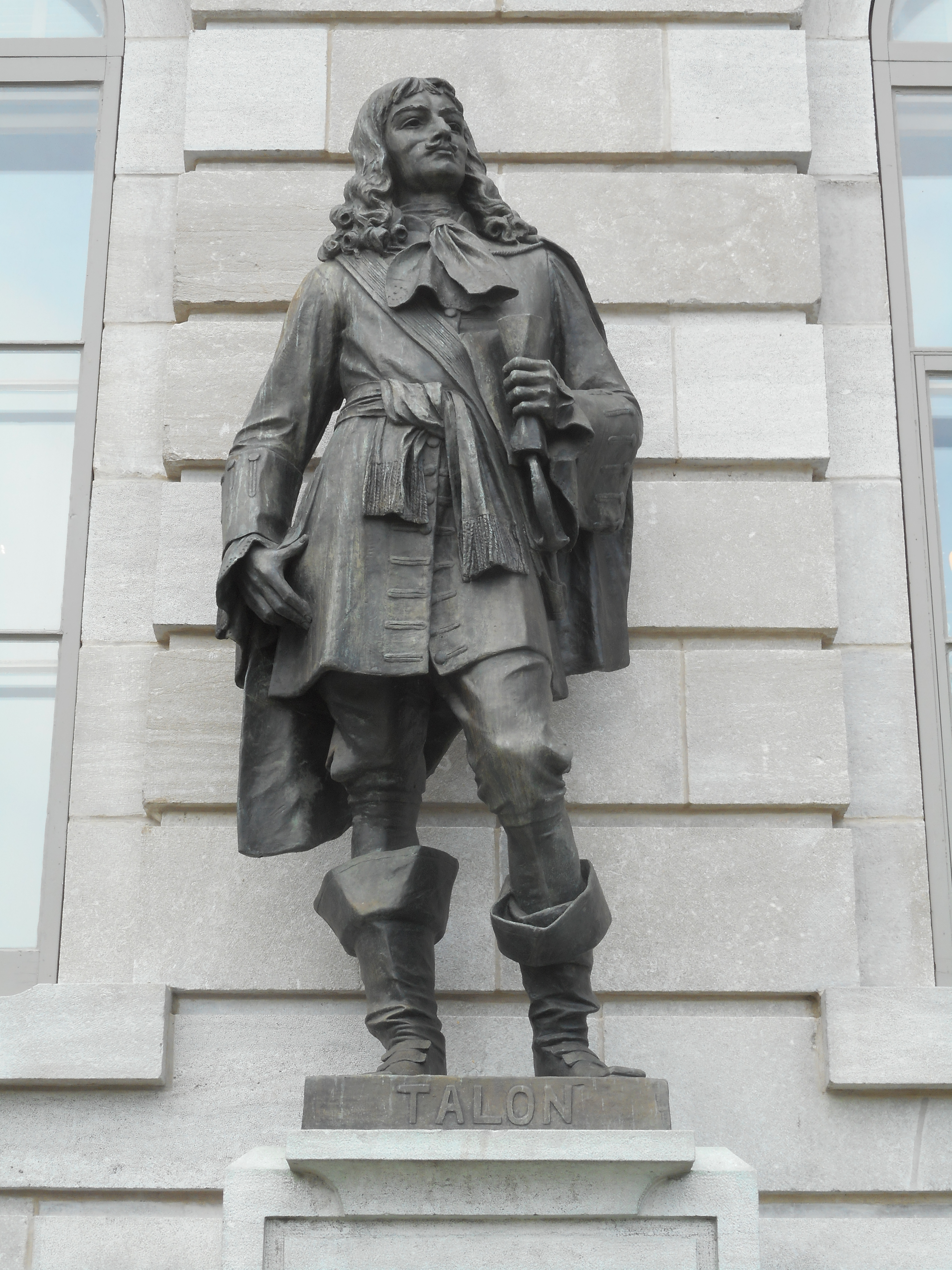
Jean Talon

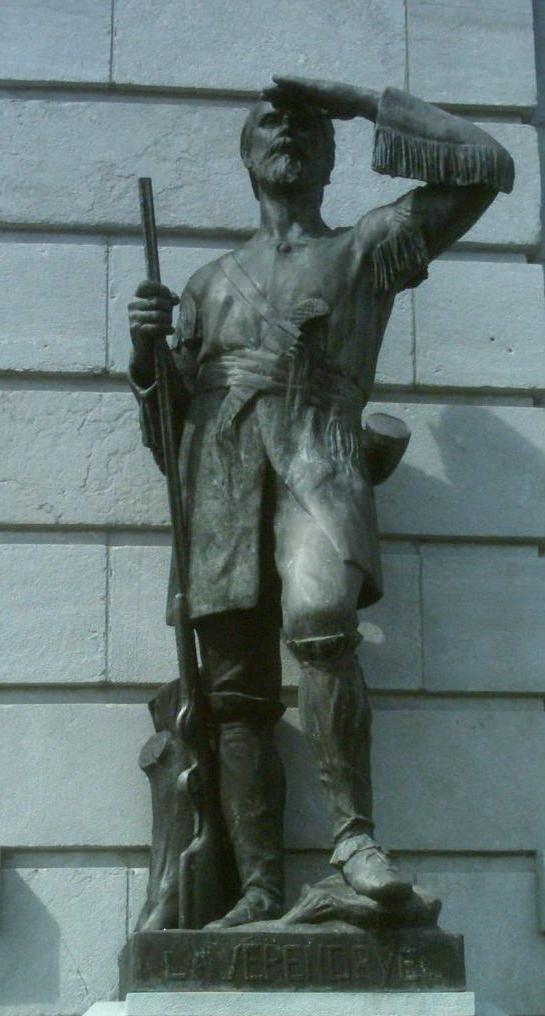
Pierre Gaultier de Varennes, sieur de La Vérendrye

In addition to that, several monuments to famous politicians are scattered on the front lawn of the parliament.

Statues of important political figures in Parliament's vicinity
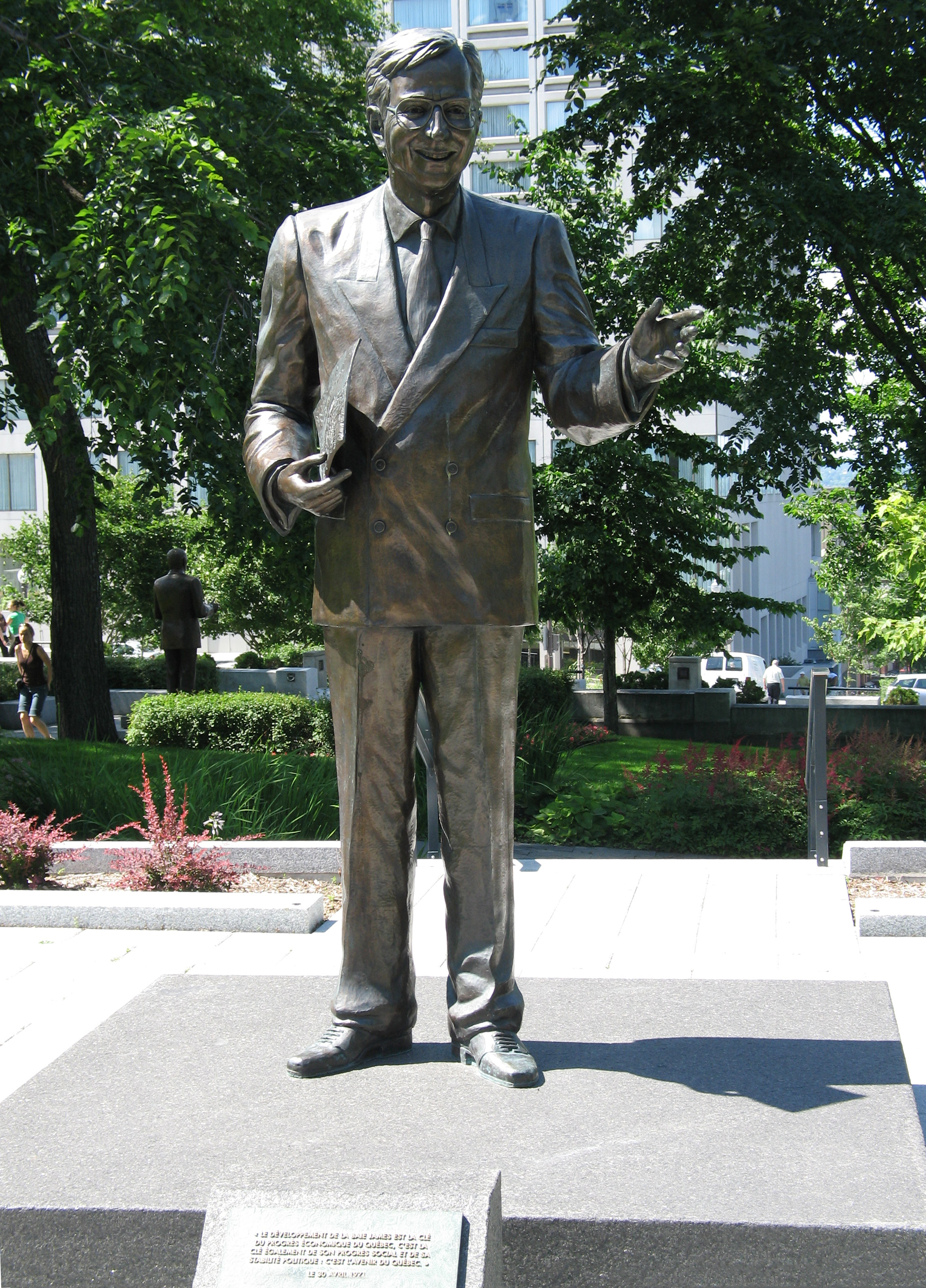
Robert Bourassa

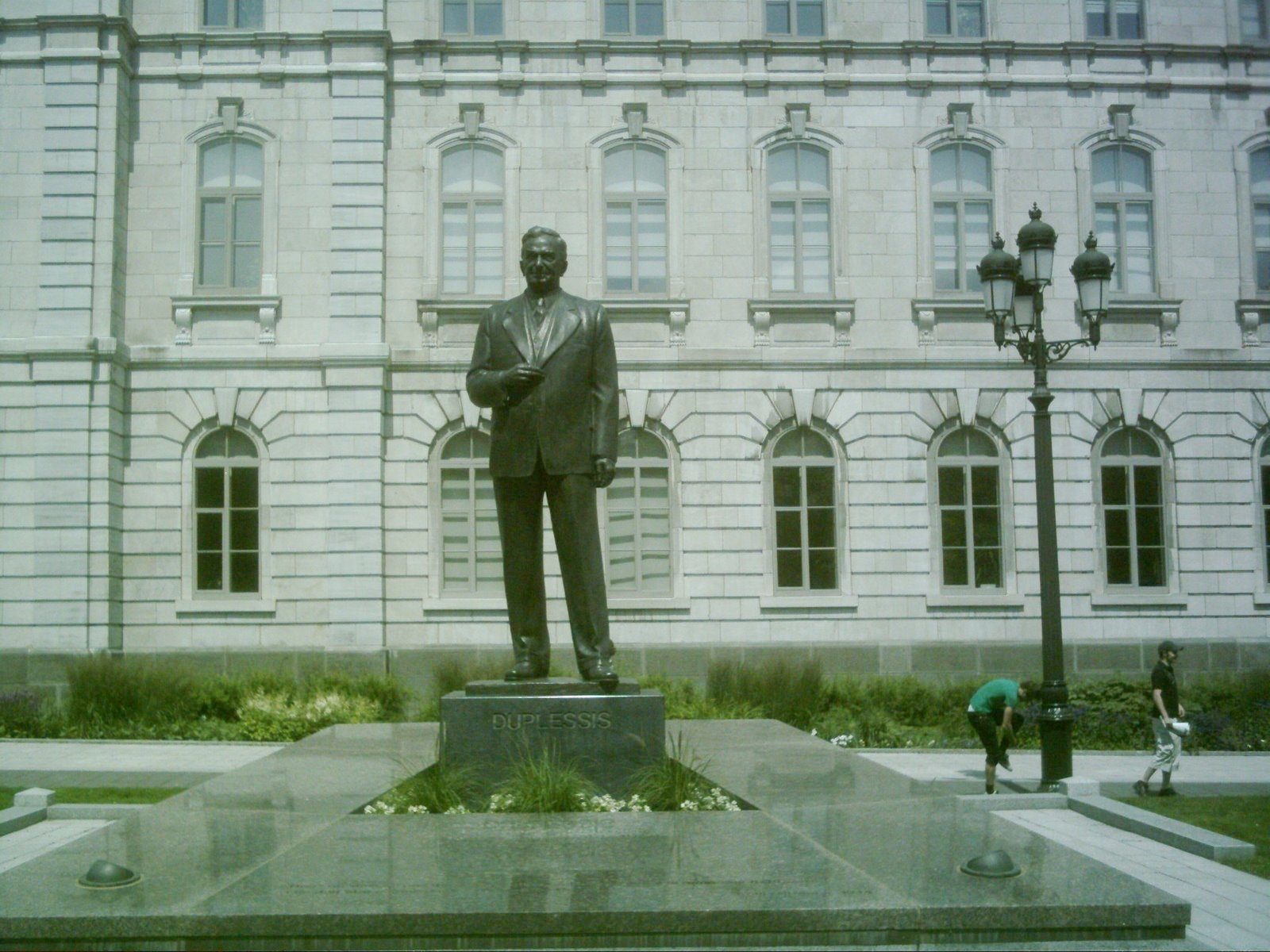
Maurice Duplessis

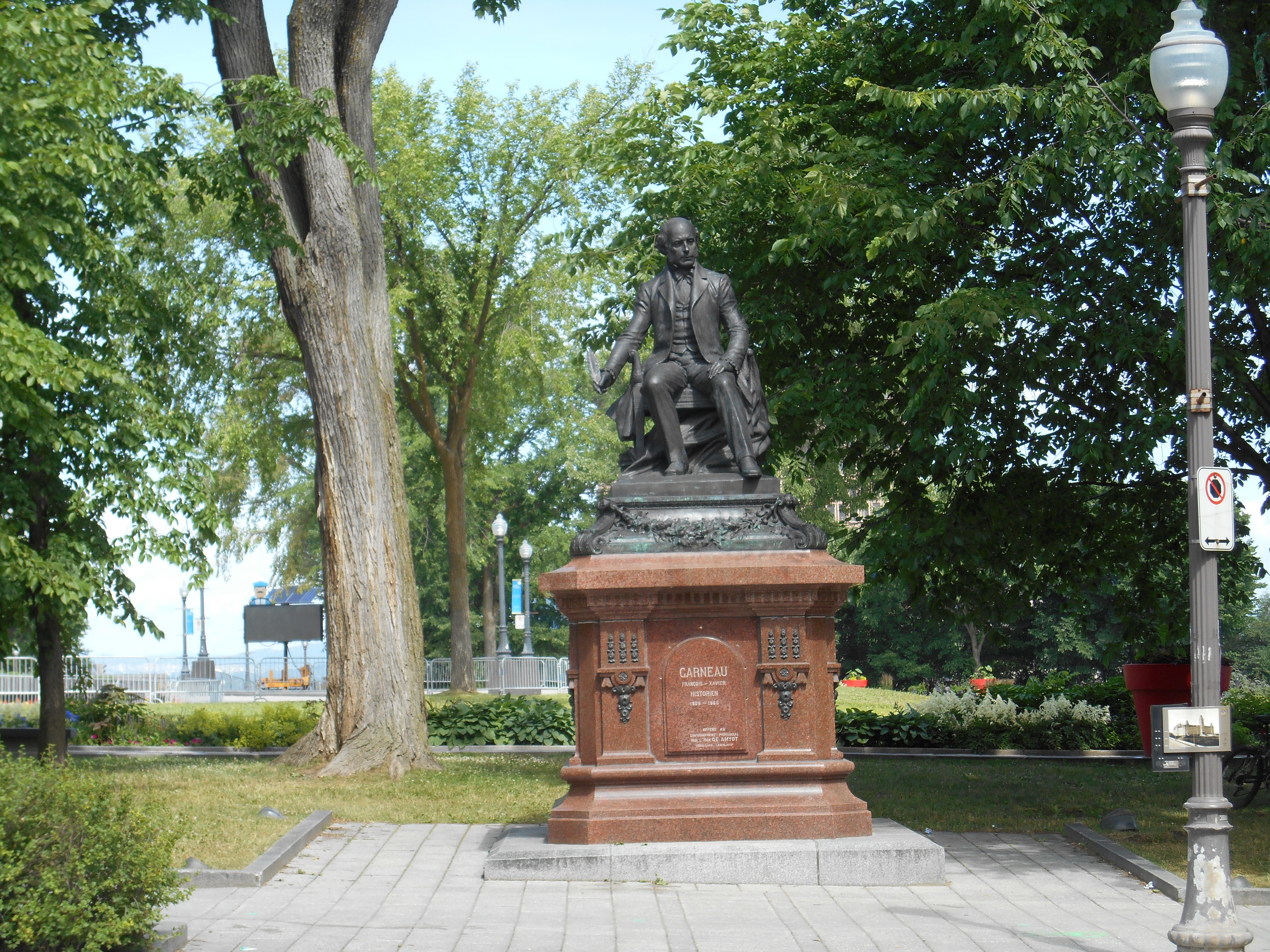
François-Xavier Garneau

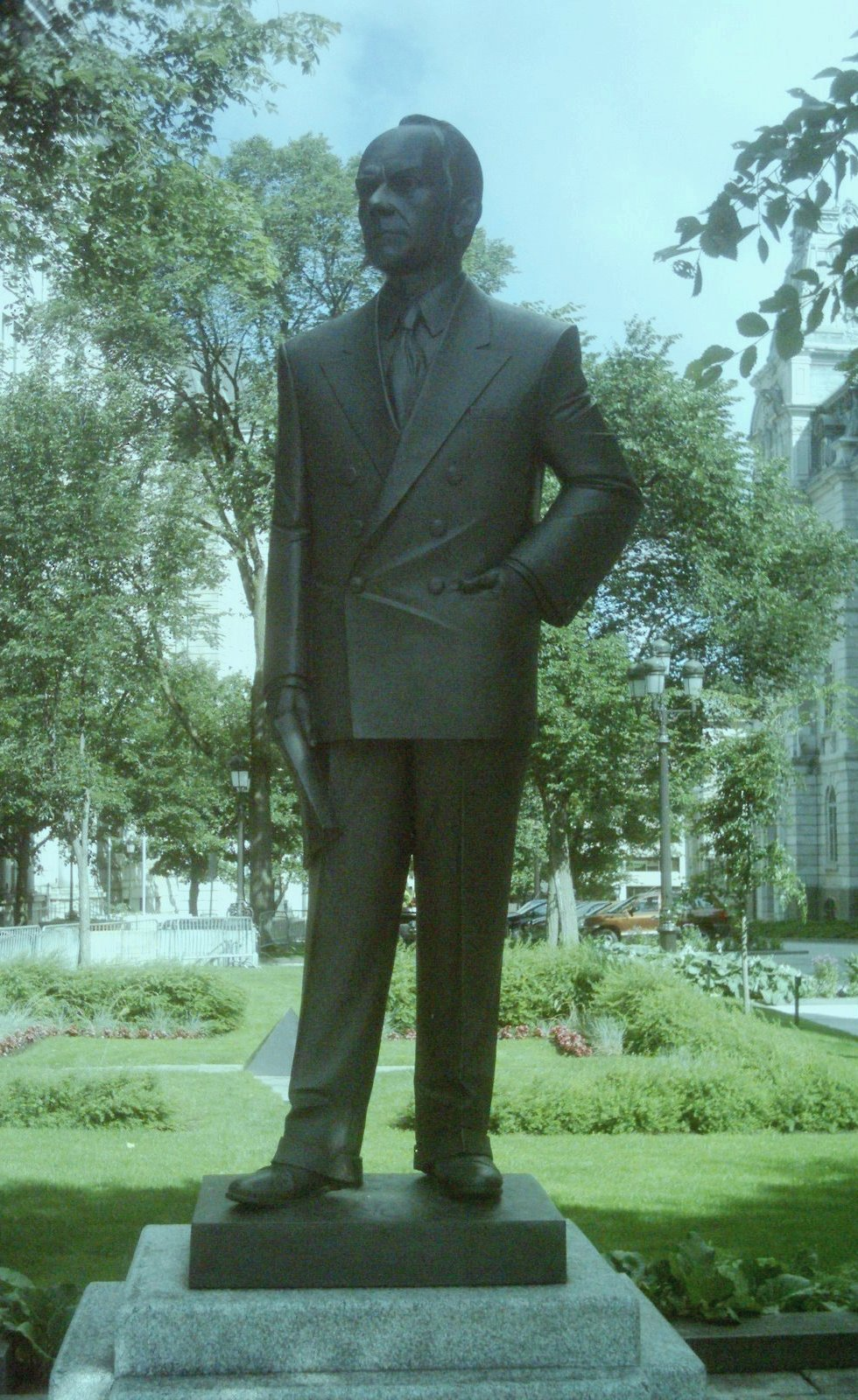
Adelard Godbout

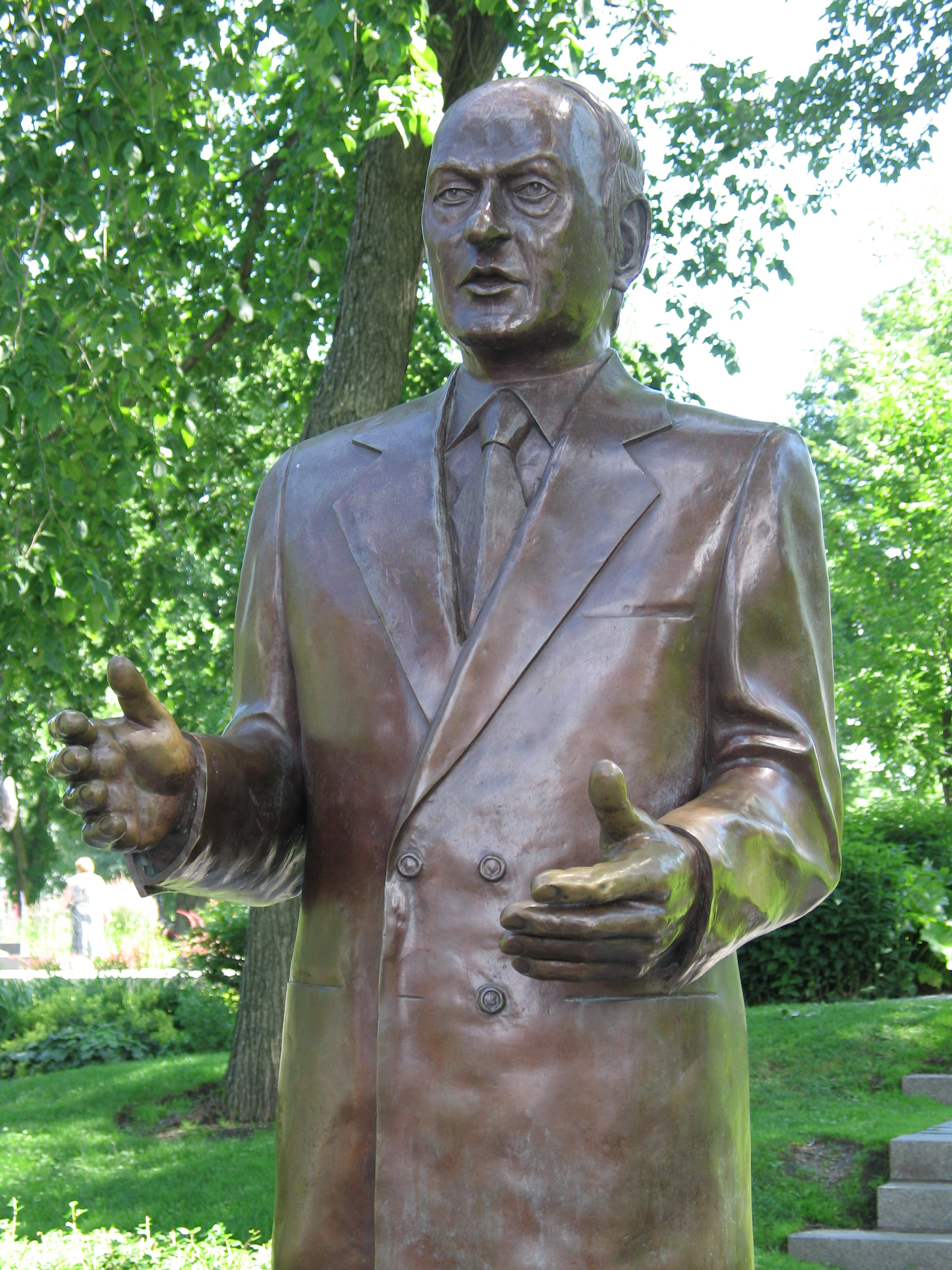
René Lévesque

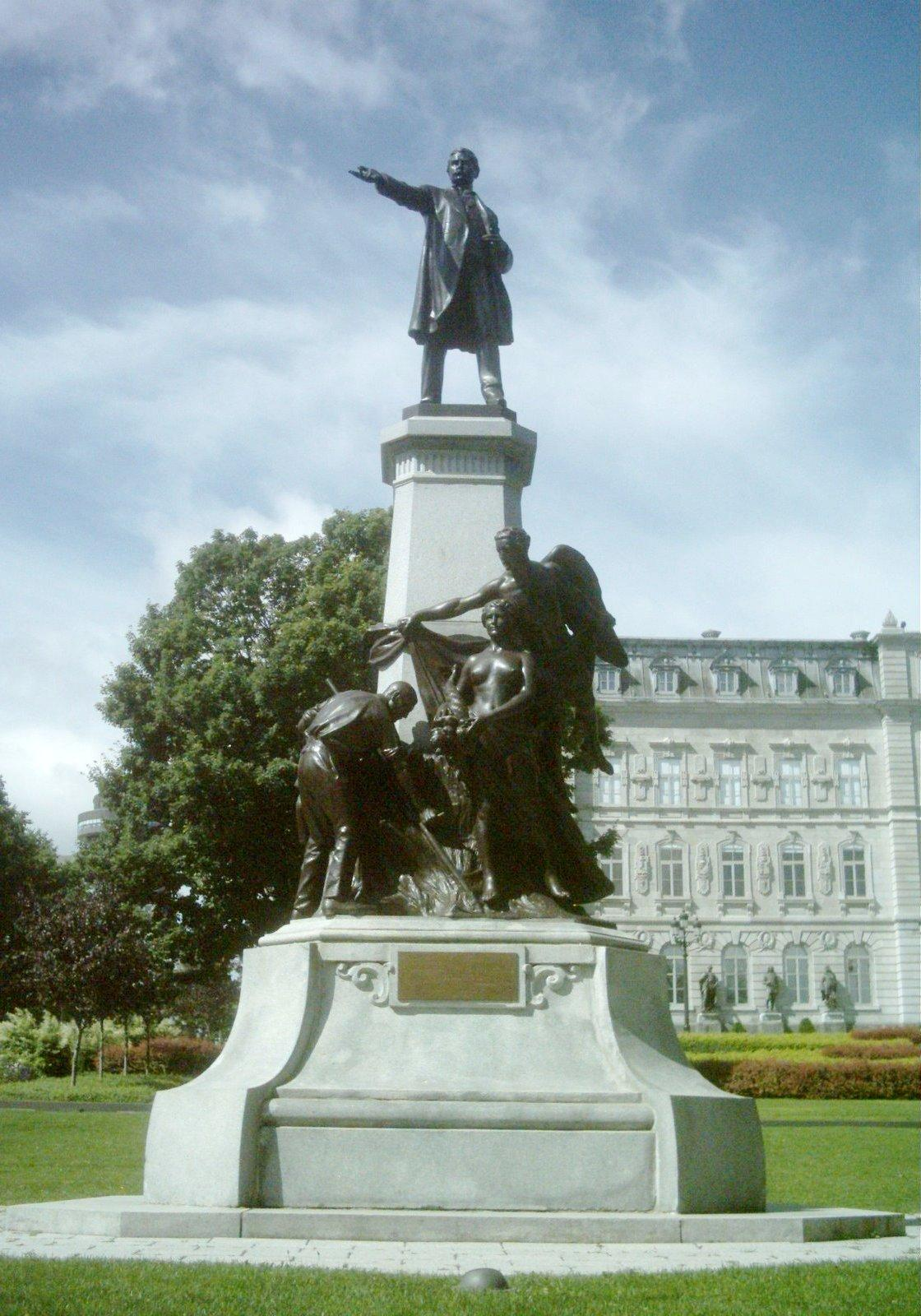
Honoré Mercier

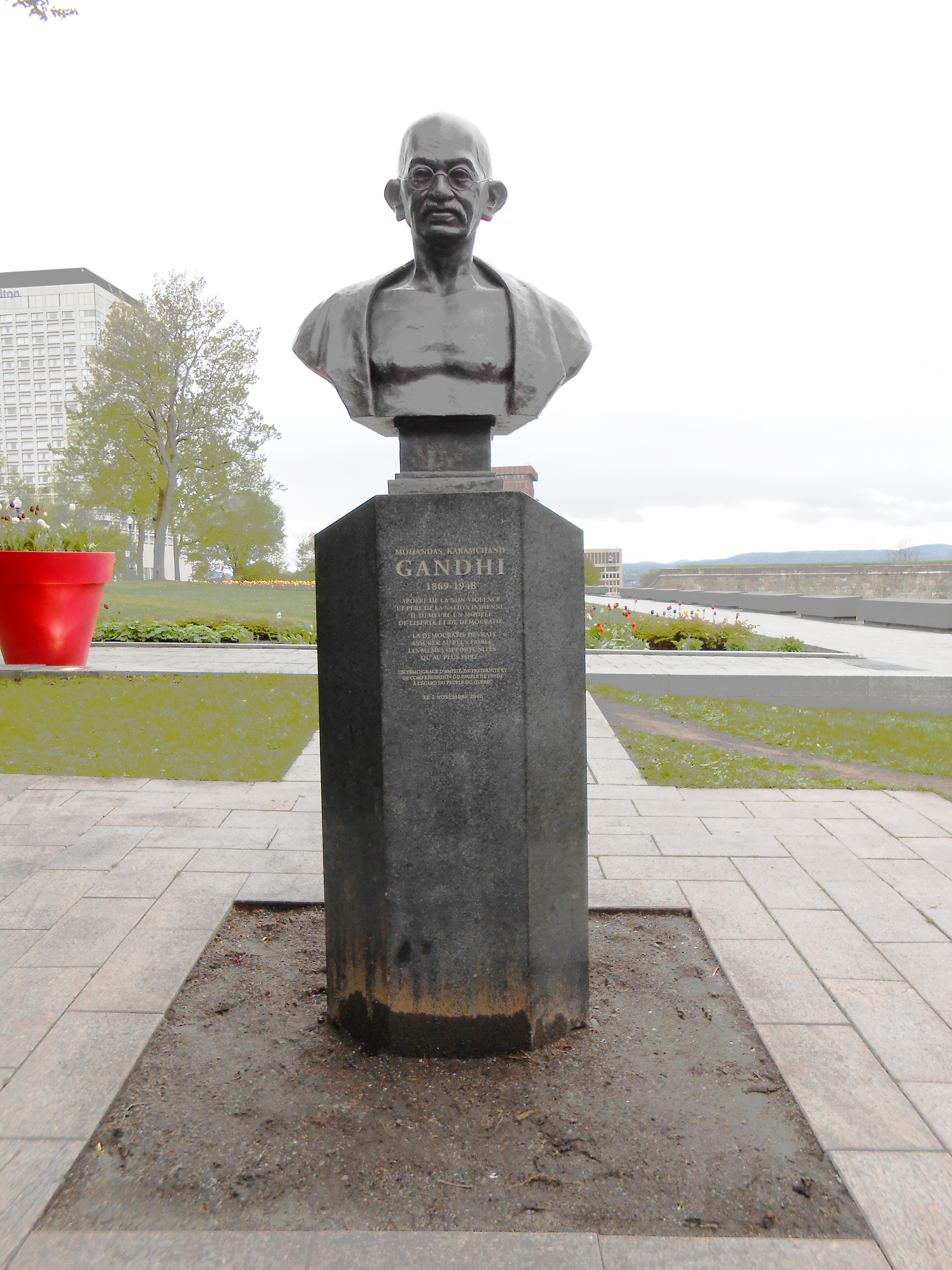
Mahatma Gandhi

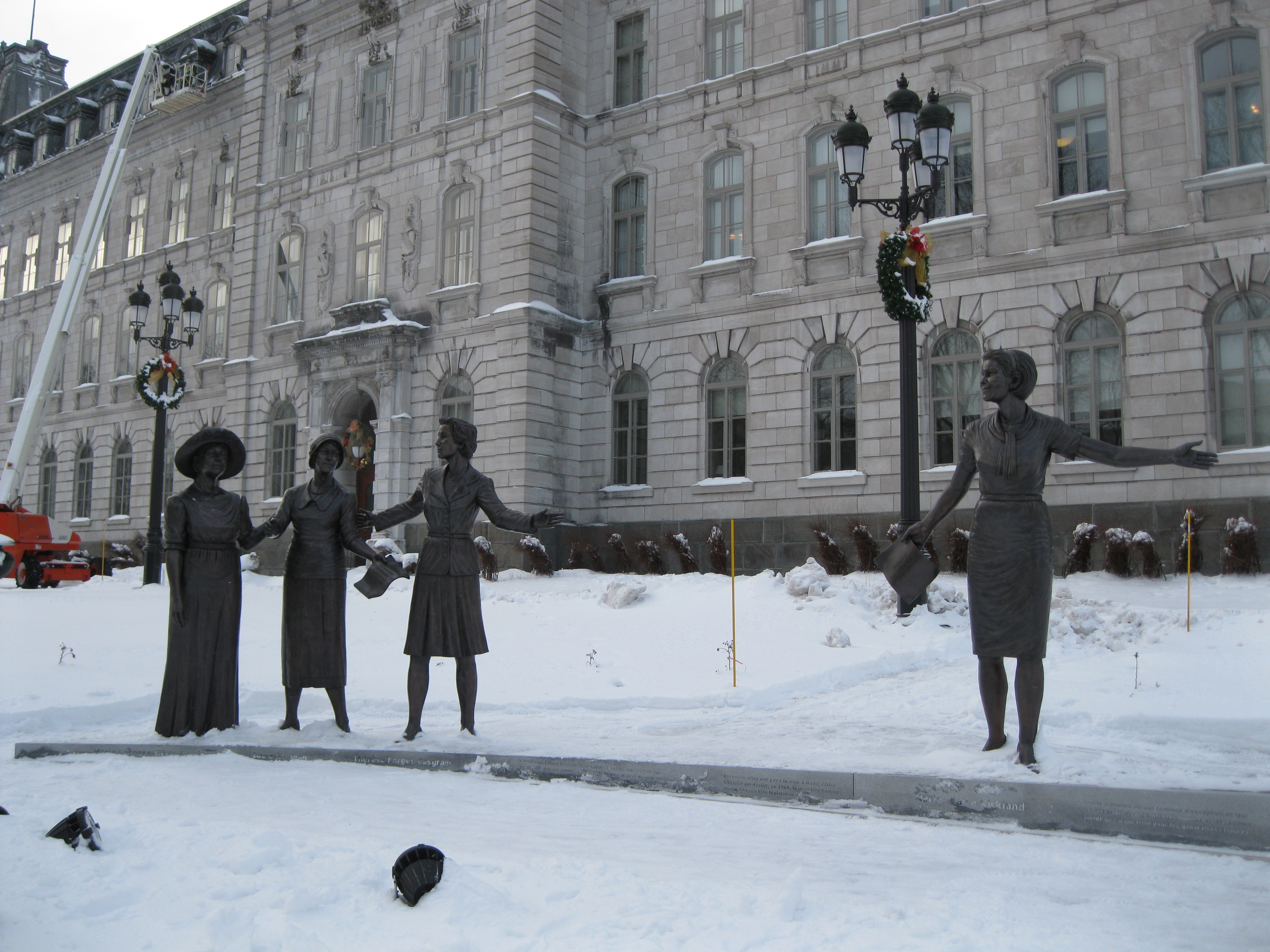
Monument in honour of women in politics

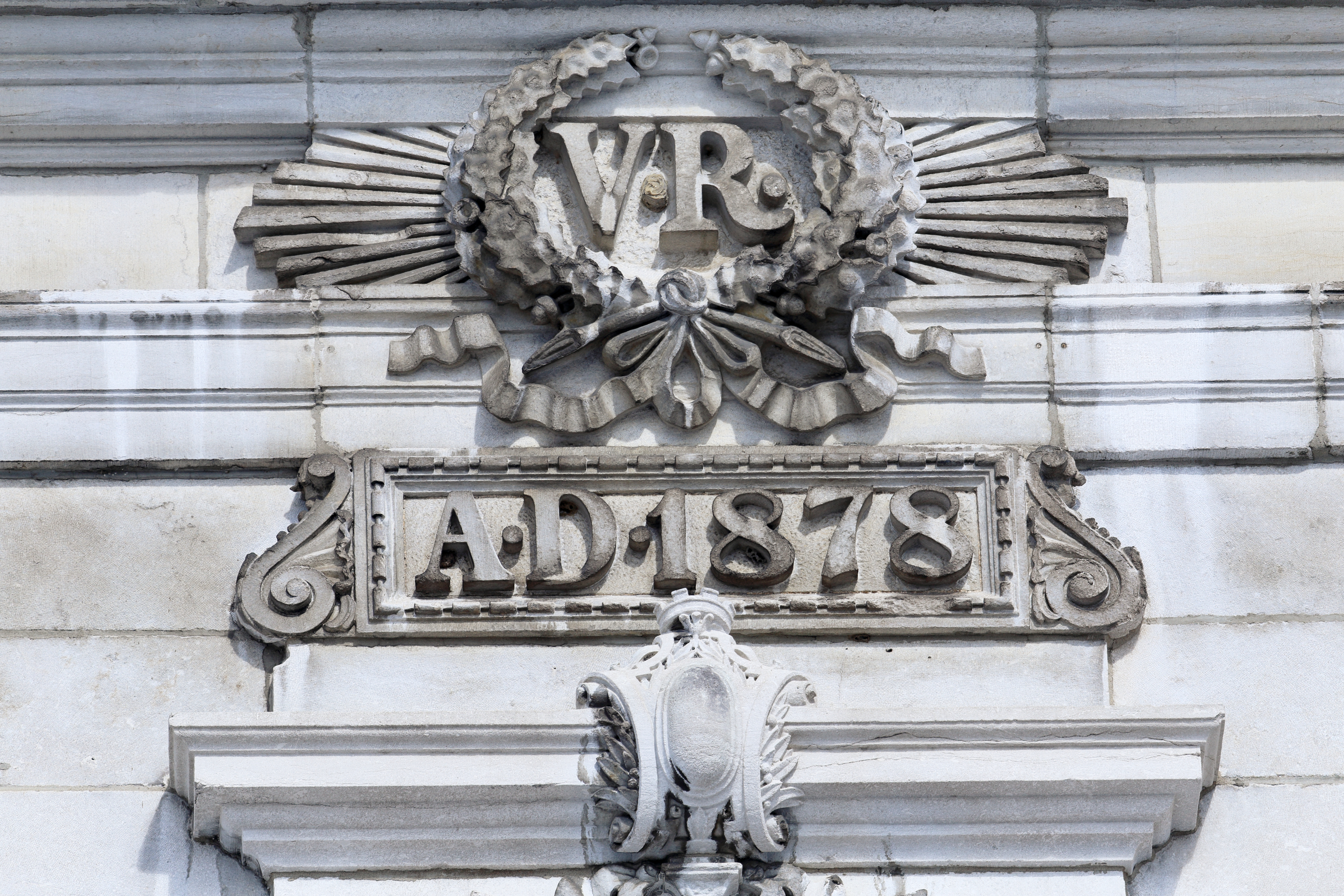
A detail of the front entrance: V.R. (Victoria Regina) and the year of completion of the detail (1878)

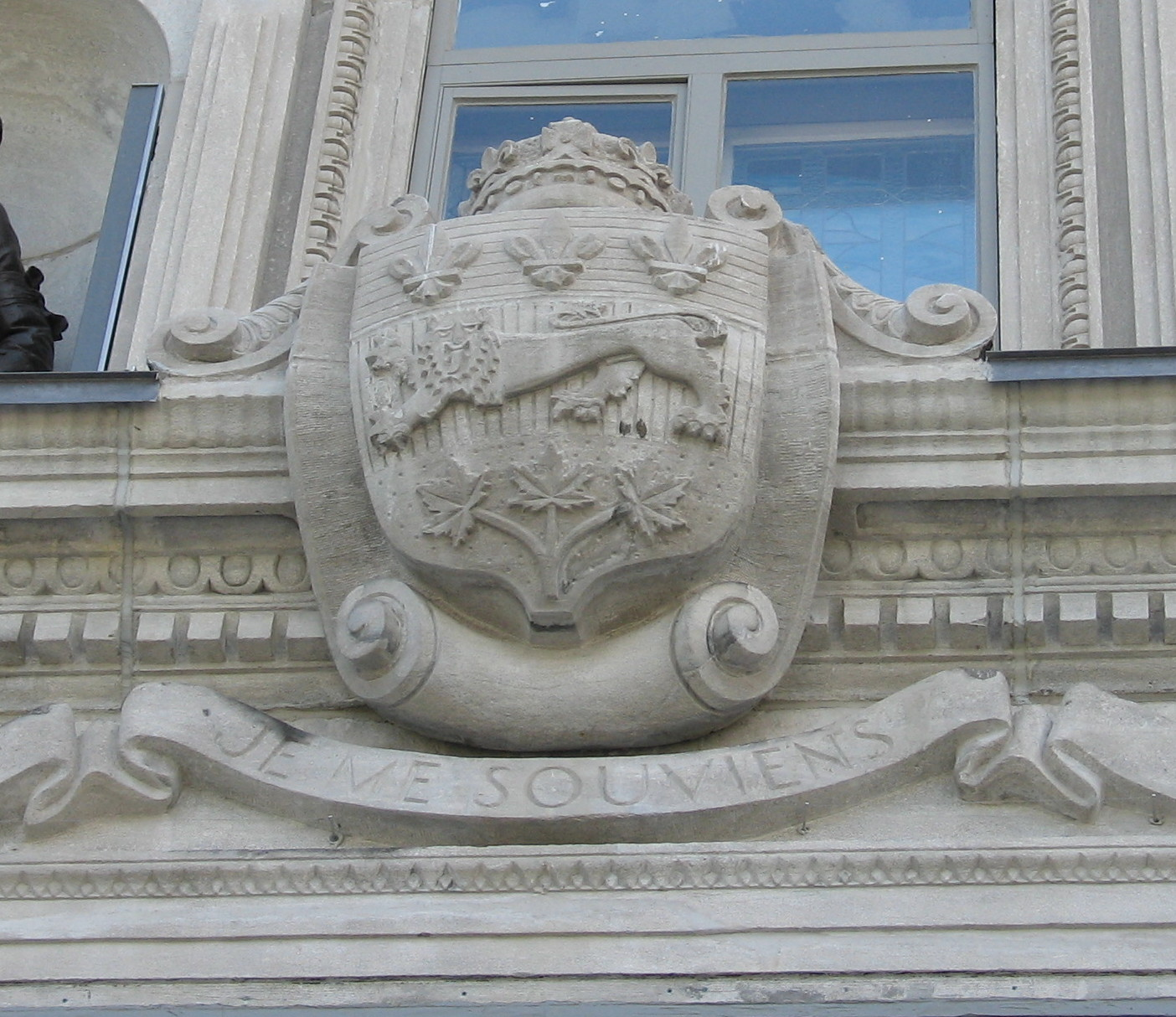
Quebec's coat of arms, with Je me souviens inscribed below, and a commemorative plaque explaining the motto's origin

=== Heraldry ===
The Parliament Building has a total of 97 coats of arms, of which 87 are identified. Quebec City's and Montreal's coat of arms appear over the statues of their founders. Several heraldic signs of the first lieutenant-governors of Quebec, as well as the names of prominent families of Quebec can also be seen on the front wall.

The 1868 version of Quebec's coat of arms is above the old entrance to the building. In 1883, Taché carved the phrase Je me souviens below it, which is considered the first time the phrase was used as a motto. It became the official provincial motto in 1939, and is now used on standard vehicle registration plates of Quebec.

=== Fountains ===
The Parliament Building vicinity has two fountains – the Fountain of the Abenaki (Fontaine des Abénaquis) and the Fountain of Tourny (Fontaine de Tourny).

The former is located below the old main entrance to the building, along with two statues of the indigenous people, with The Nigog Fisherman being in the niche just above the water and the other statue above the fountain, in the place where two staircases meet. Built in 1890, it underwent a significant change from 2016 to 2019, when it was greatly reduced in size.

The Fountain of Tourny is a relatively recent addition. Located on the roundabout on Honoré-Mercier Avenue, part of Place de l'Assemblée-Nationale, it was first cast in 1853–1854. Two copies were displayed in Bordeaux since 1858 and until 1960, when it was dismantled to construct an underground parking lot and due to rising costs of maintaining the fountain. One of them was acquired by a nearby Saint-Germain-de-la-Rivière municipality, while the other, after having been disassembled and cut in pieces, eventually went to an antique shop in Saint-Ouen-sur-Seine, a Parisian suburb. In early 2000s, an entrepreneur in Quebec, Peter Simons, decided to renovate the figures, and donated the fountain to the city of Quebec. It was inaugurated on 3 July 2007, a year before the quadricentennial celebrations of founding of the city.

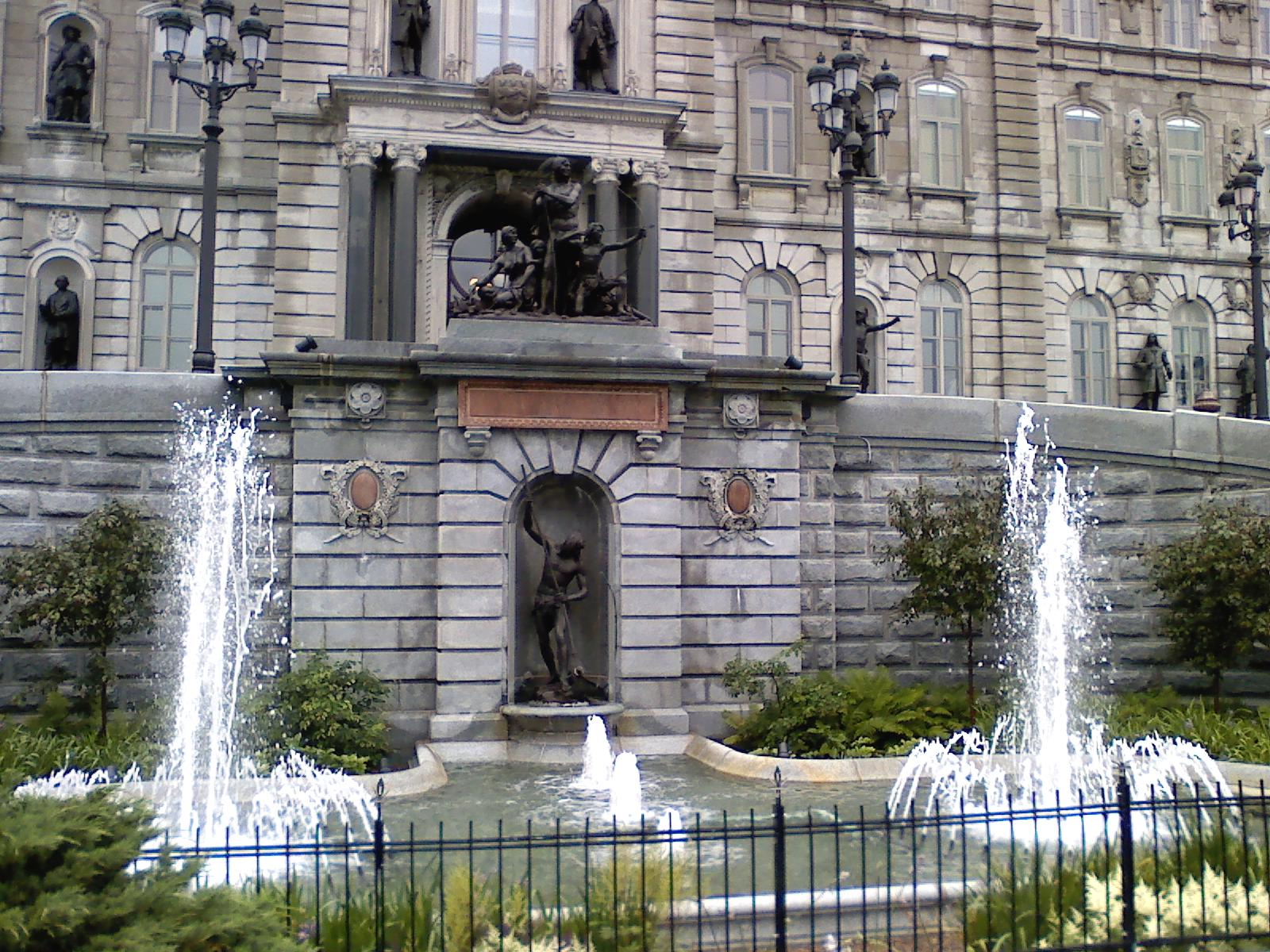
Fountain of the Abenaki in 2009, before renovations

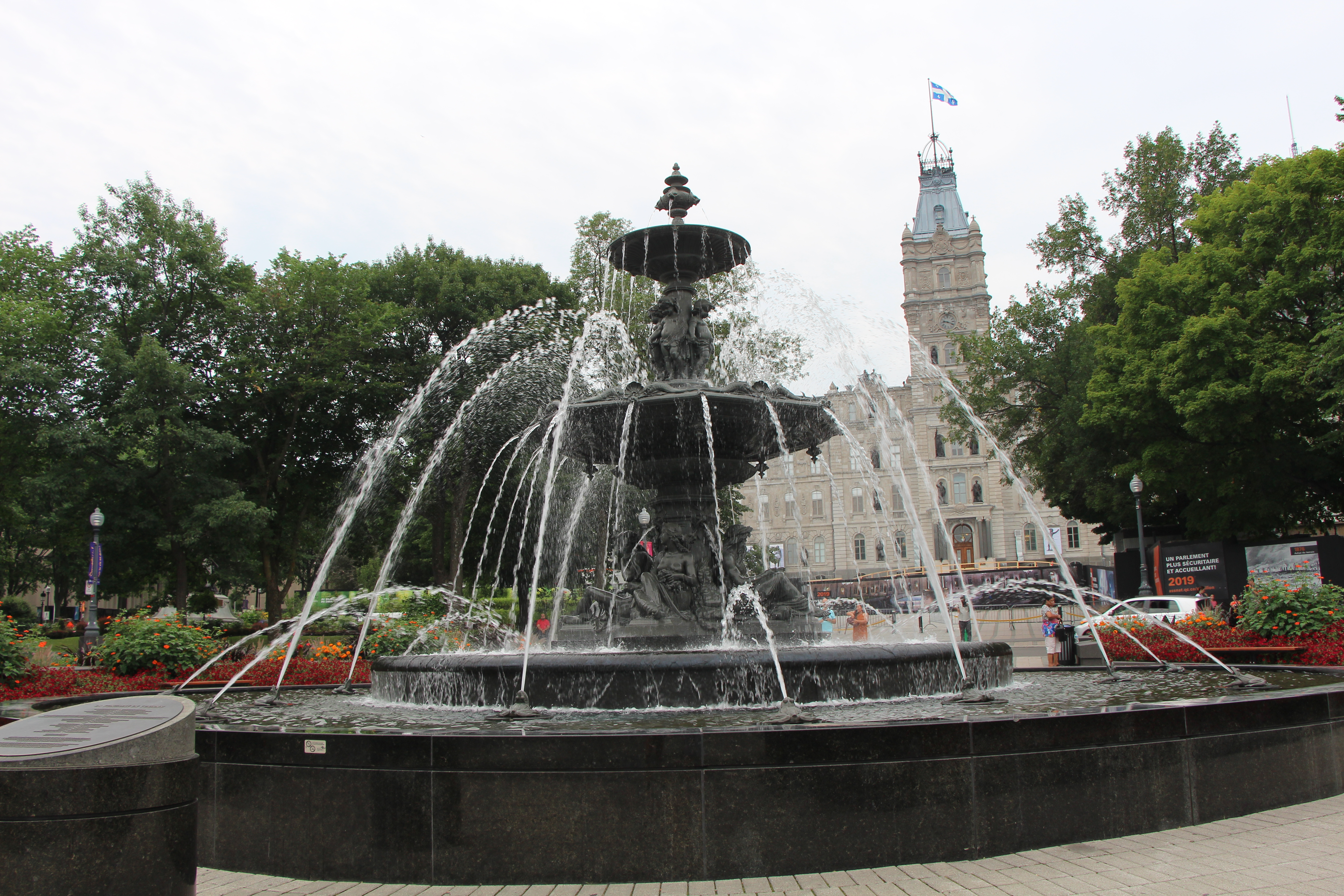
Fountain of Tourny in 2018. Note the construction works in the background.

== Interior ==
=== Parliamentary debate rooms ===
When the Quebec Legislature moved to the new building, there were two chambers: the Legislative Assembly, which sat in a room that is now commonly known as Salon bleu (Blue Room), and the Legislative Council in the Salon rouge (Red Room). The former was originally white, but it was recolored twice: first in 1901, when it was repainted green, the traditional colour of the elected chamber of Westminster-style legislatures, and then in 1978 to blue, to facilitate the broadcast of debates on television.

The Blue Room is the place where the National Assembly conducts its regular sessions. It has 124 desks for the same number of members, separated by a corridor that leads from the main doors to the clerk's table, and further to the chair of the president of the National Assembly, whose seat is elevated on a pedestal. A painting by Charles Huot, Débat sur les langues (French for 'debate on languages'), hangs behind the President's seat.

A similar-looking Red Room used to be the place where the upper chamber presided, until it was abolished in 1968. It is now used for the works of parliamentary committees and for solemn occasions, such as administering oaths of office. Unlike the Blue Room, however, the Red Room's furniture may be rearranged depending on the parliament's needs. The painting opposite the entrance to the room is Charles Huot's Le Conseil souverain (French for 'the sovereign council'), which depicts a debate of the colonial government of New France.

Renovations of the Blue Room are ongoing. The National Assembly decided to ditch the traditional Westminster layout of seats, where government benches face the opposition, in favour of a horseshoe outline of seats. This arrangement is similar to the that used in the Australian House of Representatives. Until the renovation is finished in fall 2026, the MNAs will sit in the Red Room.

=== Flag Room ===
The Flag Room used to serve various purposes: it was used a press conference room (also called hot room) and also served as a museum. From 1985, it has displayed eight flags that inspired the current design of the flag of Quebec, or the fleurdelisé. These flags include three from the Kingdom of France, two naval ensigns, two Carillon flags and the current one.

Flags displayed in the Flag Room
Banner of the Kingdom of France

Coat of Arms of the Kingdom of France

Royal Standard of Louis XIV

Ensign of the admiralty of Saint-Malo

Ensign of the French royal trade navy, 17th century

Carillon flag

Carillon flag, modern version

Fleurdelisé

=== Hot room ===
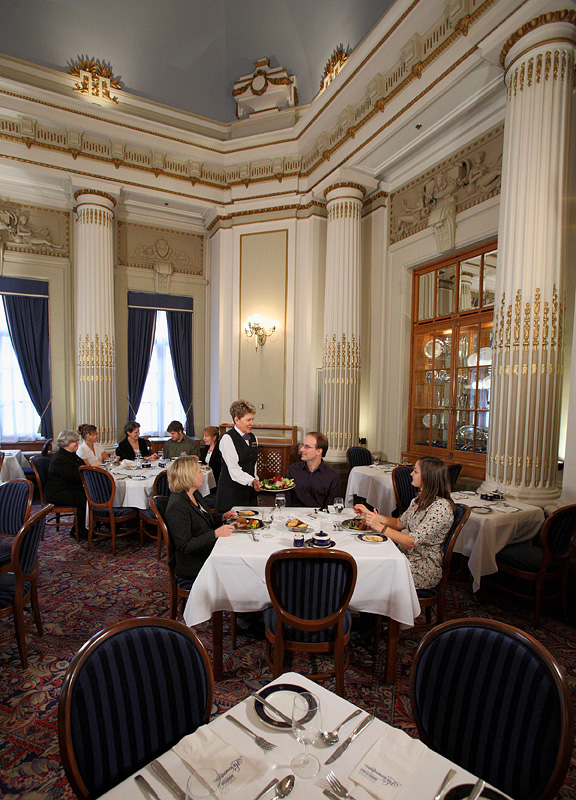
Le Parlementaire restaurant in 2010

The press conference room (officially called Salle Bernard-Lalonde and commonly referred to as "hot room", both in English and in French) is in the north side of the building. It was originally named so due to the heat that the cameras were emitting, but the name is sometimes interpreted as a reference to the heated atmosphere caused by numerous questions of journalists. Until 1976, it served as a bar. The "hot room" moved to its current location in mid-1980s.

=== Le Parlementaire restaurant ===
The Le Parlementaire restaurant was not built when the building was inaugurated, but during an expansion in 1910s, Jean-Omer Marchand from Montreal and Georges-Émile Tanguay from Quebec City proposed a new space for a canteen for members of parliament in a Beaux-Arts style, which was popular at the time. It was built in 1912-1917 and has continued to serve the same purpose since then. The restaurant was originally called Le Café du Parlement (Parliament Café), but was renamed Le Parlementaire (French for 'member of Parliament') in 1970.

The restaurant was initially open only to members of parliament, but it opened to the general public in 1968. It notably hosted election campaign debates for the 2007 and 2008 Quebec general elections. In 2025, the restaurant gained a Michelin star.

=== 2016-2019 extension ===
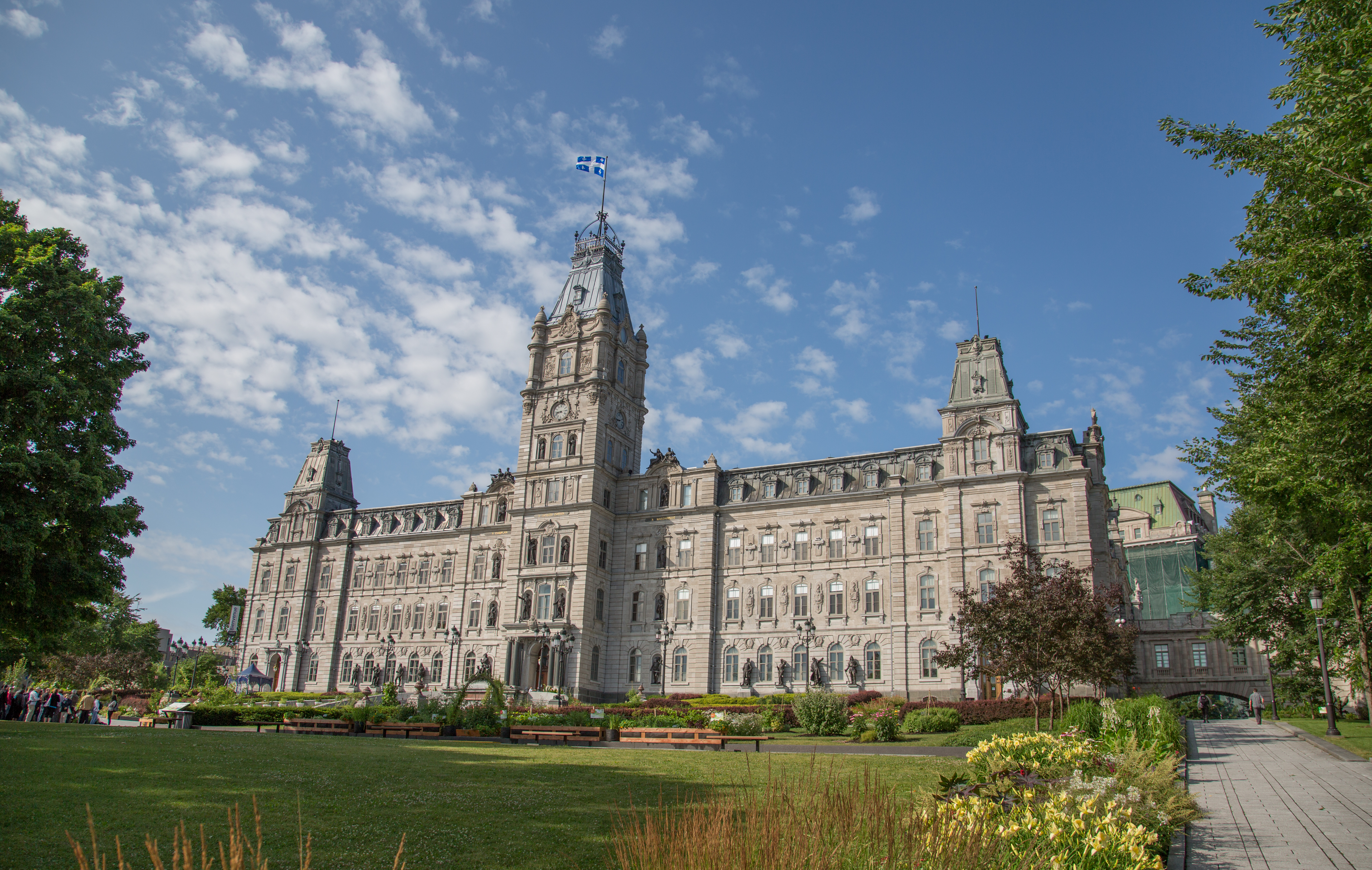
Parliament Building before the construction of new entrance, in 2015.

In October 2014, a shooting at Parliament Hill occurred in Ottawa, which raised concerns about the security of the Parliament Building in Quebec. Accordingly, in November 2015, Jacques Chagnon, president of the National Assembly, unveiled a $60.5 million project that envisaged the construction of an underground entrance with enhanced security features, as well as a new conference room and space for parliamentary committees. After three years of work, the new entrance was inaugurated in May 2019 and opened to the public on 1 June that year.

The expansion was generally received positively. The Ordre des architectes du Québec, a provincial trade organization, gave an award to the planners of the expansion, lauding the preservation of architectural values in the building and increased accessibility; Olivier Vallerand, a professor of architecture at McGill University, similarly approved of the design. On the other hand, the expansion came at a cost of reducing the area occupied by the Abenaki fountain, a change some, including Gaston Deschênes, a historian who wrote a monograph on the Parliament Building, criticized as violating the will of the original architect.

== Notable mentions ==
The Parliament Building was mentioned on one-dollar tokens issued for the Quebec Winter Carnival in 1984.

== See also ==
- Bonsecours Market, built in 1849
- Philadelphia City Hall, completed 1901 in a similar style
- National Assembly of Quebec
