= Monarchy in Quebec =

Function of the Canadian monarchy in Quebec

King in Right of Quebec
- Provincial
- De facto Coat of arms of Quebec

Incumbent
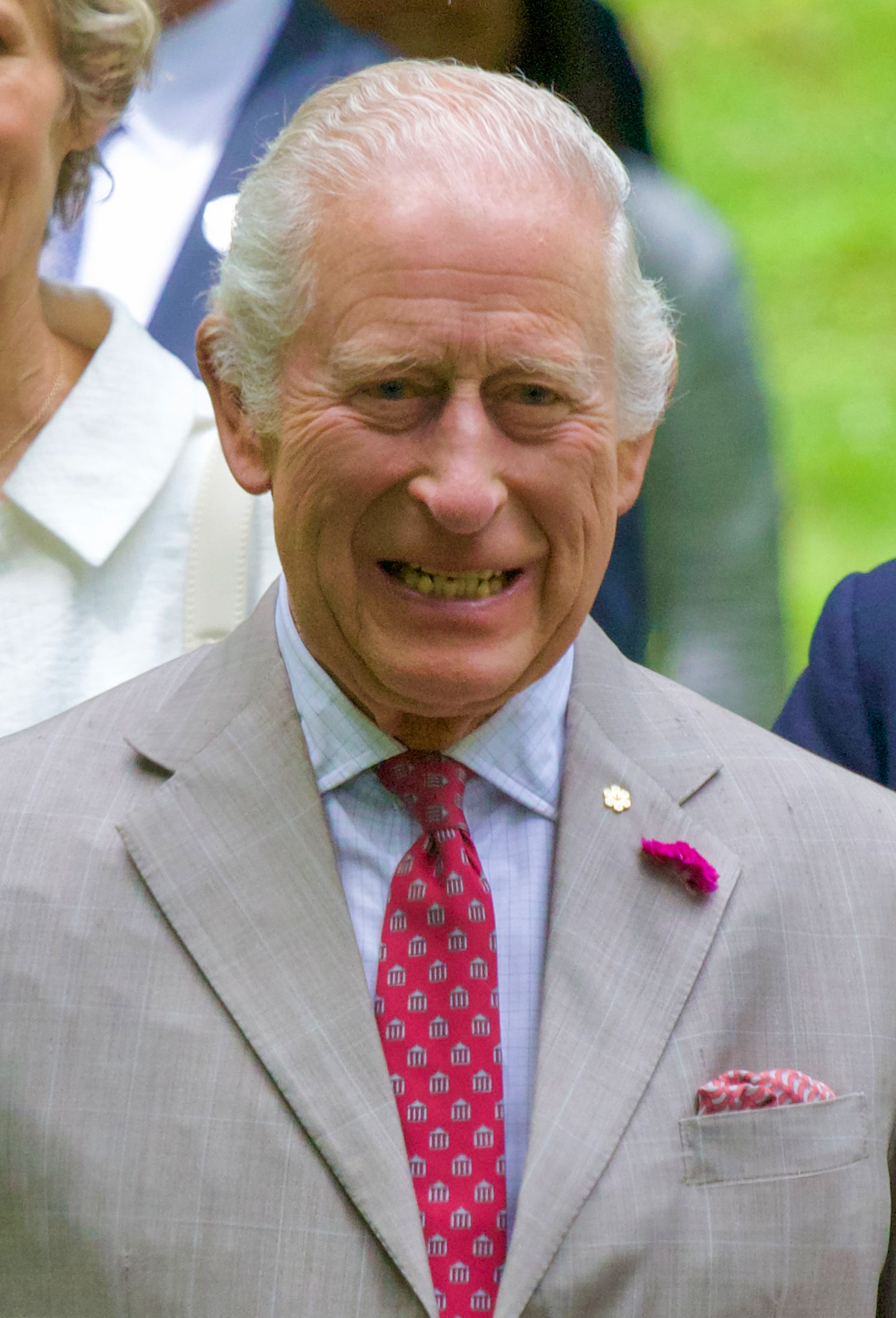
- Charles III; King of Canada (Roi du Canada) since 8 September 2022

Details
- Style: His Majesty
- First monarch: Victoria
- Formed: 1 July 1867

By the arrangements of the Canadian federation, Canada's monarchy operates in Quebec as the core of the province's Westminster-style parliamentary democracy and constitution. As such, the Crown within Quebec's jurisdiction is referred to as the Crown in Right of Quebec (French: couronne du chef du Québec, pronounced [kuʁɔn dy ʃɛf dy kebɛk]), His Majesty in Right of Quebec (French: Sa Majesté du chef du Québec, pronounced [sa maʒɛste dy ʃɛf dy kebɛk]), or the King in Right of Quebec (French: le roi du chef du Québec, pronounced [lə ʁwa dy ʃɛf dy kebɛk]). The Constitution Act, 1867, however, leaves many royal duties in the province specifically assigned to the sovereign's viceroy, the lieutenant governor of Quebec, whose direct participation in governance is limited by the conventional stipulations of constitutional monarchy.

== Constitutional role ==
The role of the Crown is both legal and practical; it functions in Quebec in the same way it does in all of Canada's other provinces, being the centre of a constitutional construct in which the institutions of government acting under the sovereign's authority share the power of the whole. It is thus the foundation of the executive, legislative, and judicial branches of the province's government. The Canadian monarch—since 8 September 2022, King Charles III—is represented and his duties carried out by the lieutenant governor of Quebec, whose direct participation in governance is limited by the conventional stipulations of constitutional monarchy, with most related powers entrusted for exercise by the elected parliamentarians, the ministers of the Crown drawn from among them, and the judges and justices of the peace. The Crown today primarily functions as a guarantor of continuous and stable governance and a nonpartisan safeguard against the abuse of power. This arrangement began with the 1867 British North America Act and continued an unbroken line of monarchical government extending back to the early 16th century, making Quebec the oldest continuously monarchical territory in North America. However, though it has a separate government headed by the King, as a province, Quebec is not itself a kingdom.

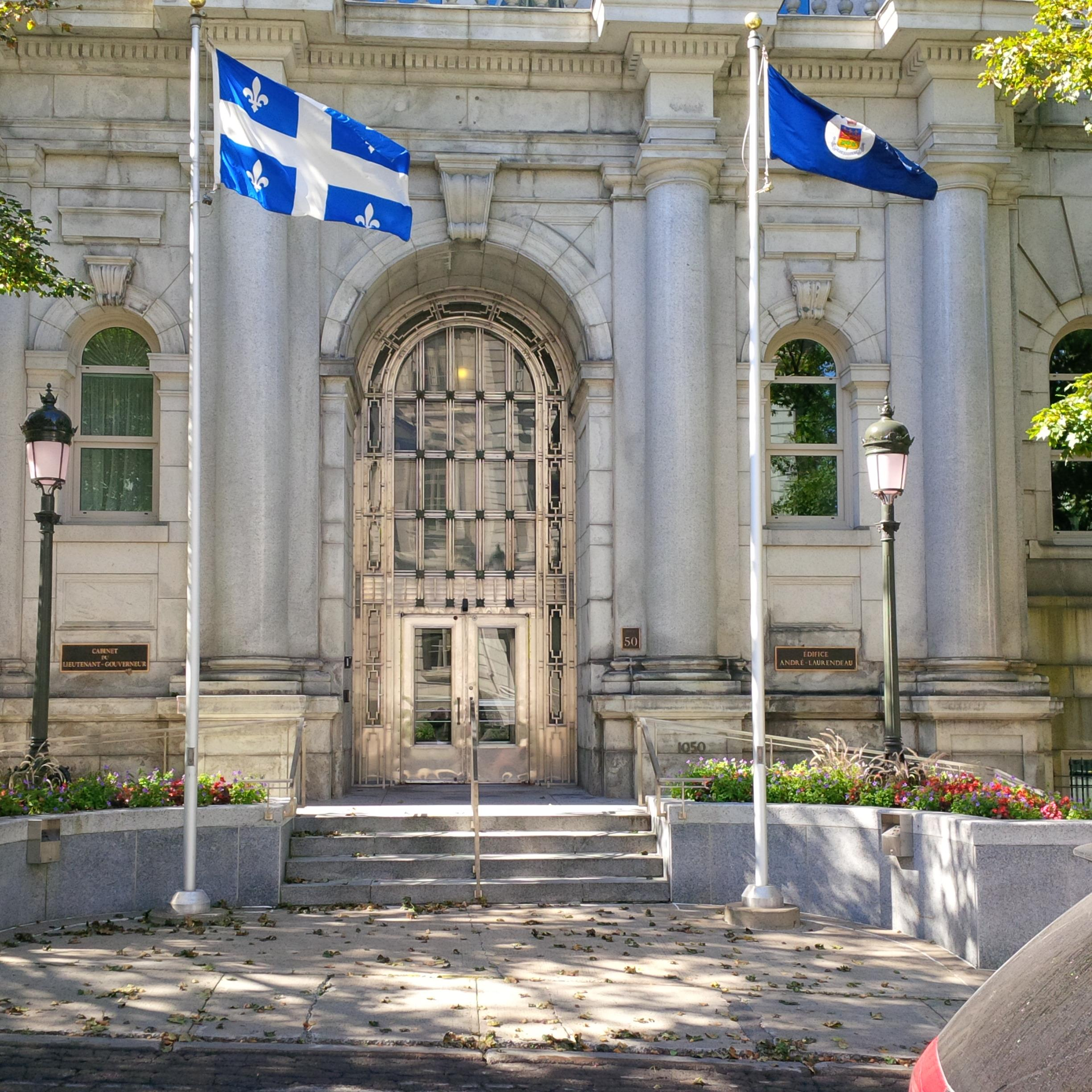
The entrance to the lieutenant governor of Quebec's viceregal suite in the André-Laurendeau Building, Quebec City. The lieutenant governor's standard fies at right.

Upon the death of the monarch (known as the demise of the Crown), An Act Respecting the Demise of the Crown ensures that all activities of the provincial Parliament, Cabinet, courts, and employees of the Crown continue without interruption. This law was required because earlier legislation that attempted to remove all references to the monarchy in Quebec left a "legal vacuum".

There is currently no government house in Quebec. A viceregal suite in the André-Laurendeau Building in Quebec City is used both as an office and official event location by the lieutenant governor, the sovereign, and other members of the Canadian royal family. The viceroy resides in a separate home provided by the provincial Crown and the King and his relations reside at a hotel when in Quebec; either the Château Frontenac in Quebec City or the Queen Elizabeth Hotel in Montreal.

== Royal associations ==
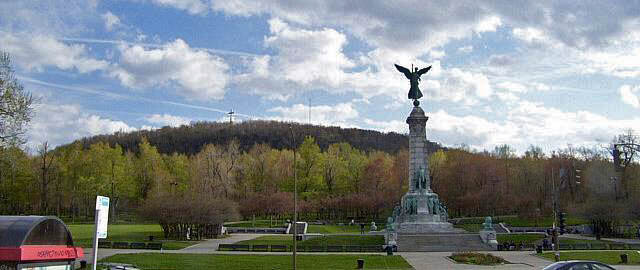
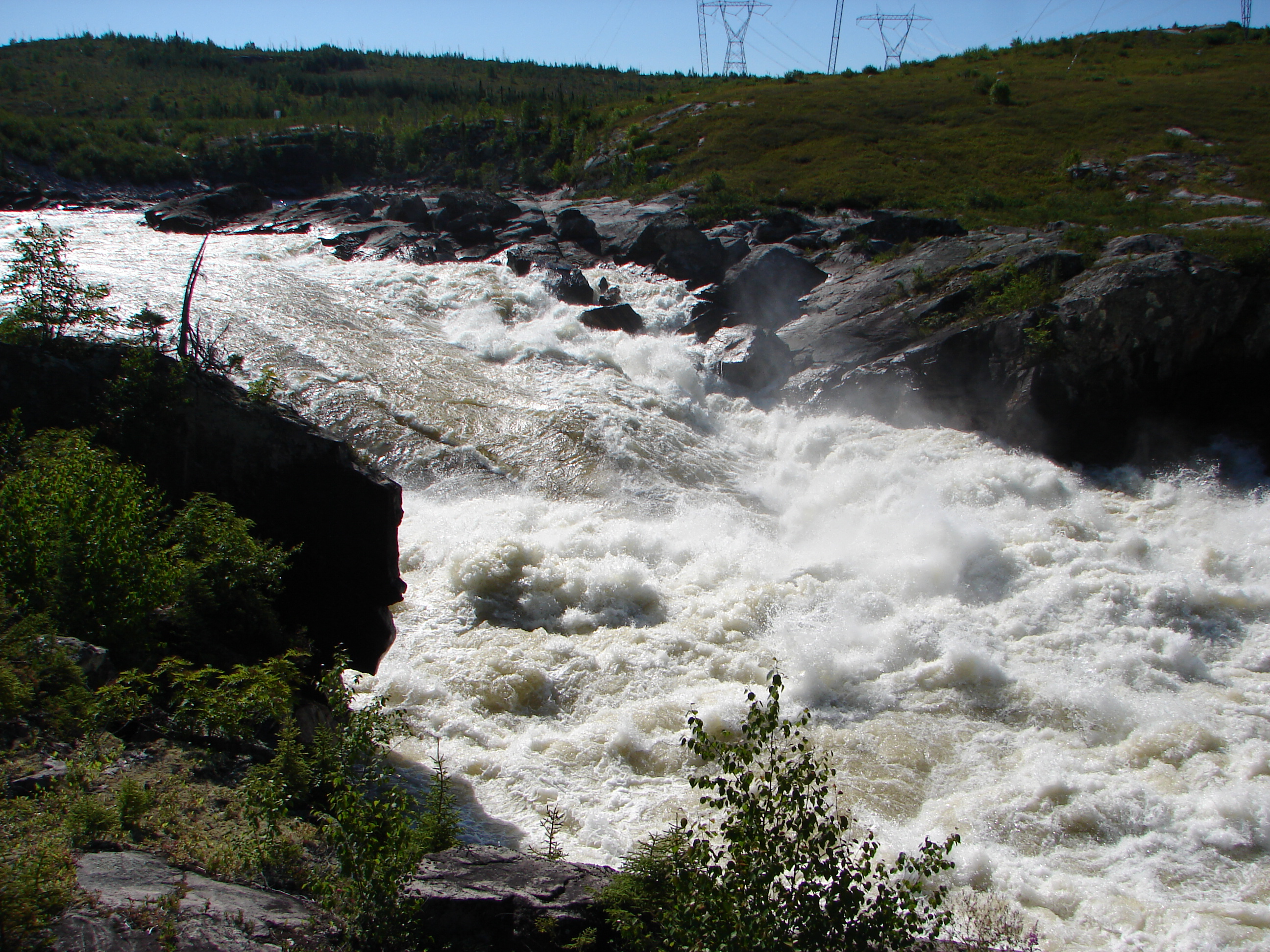
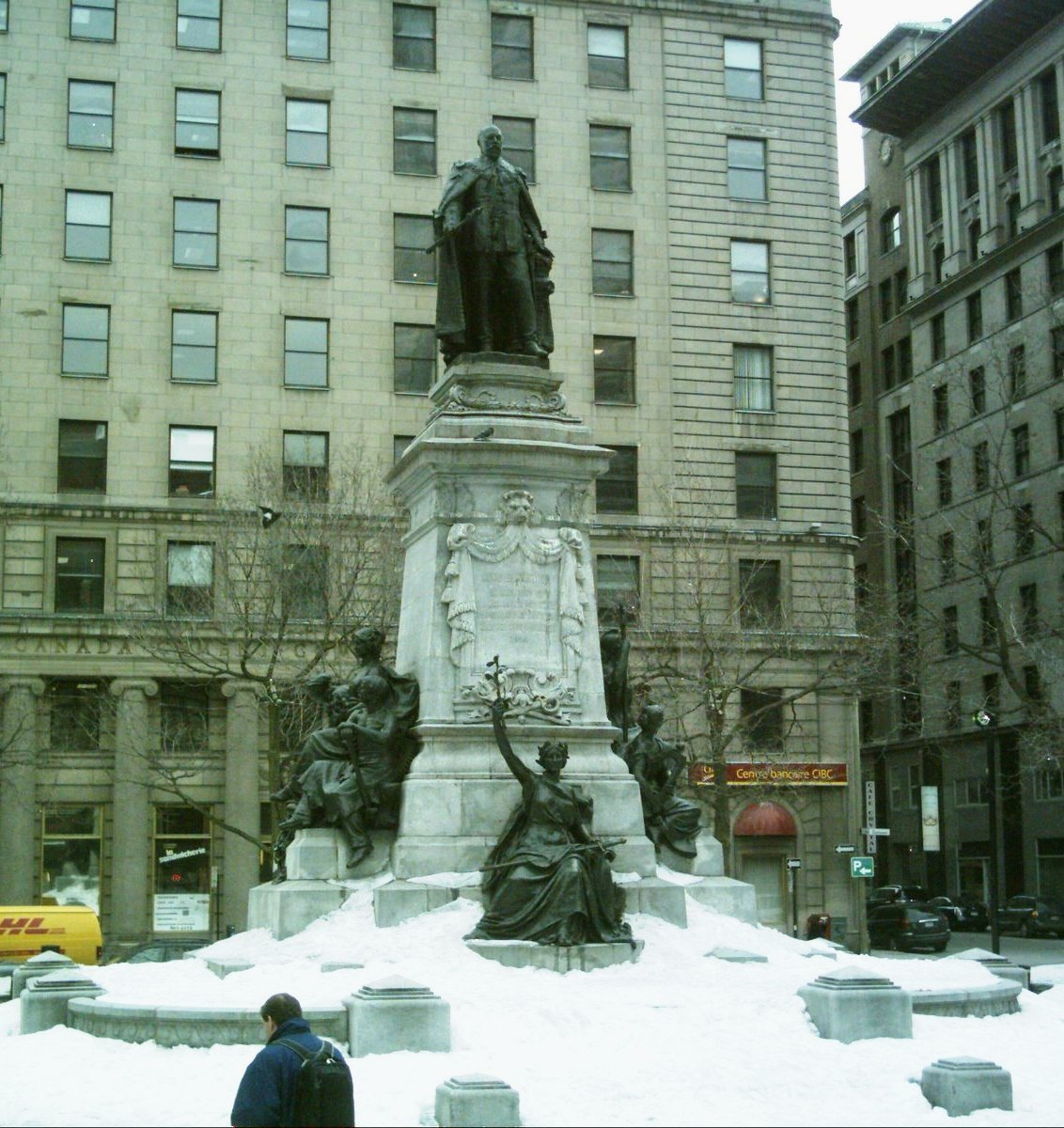
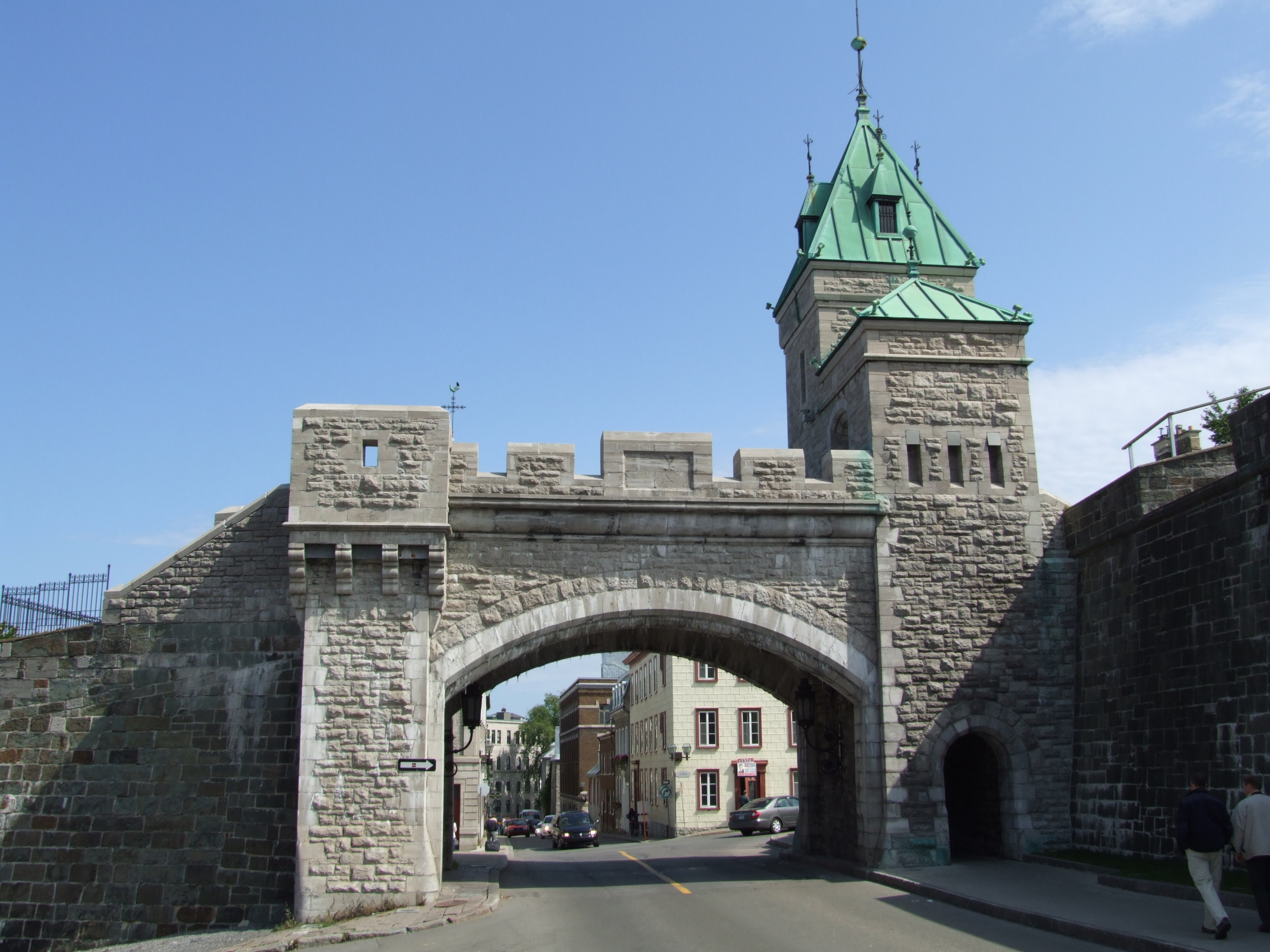
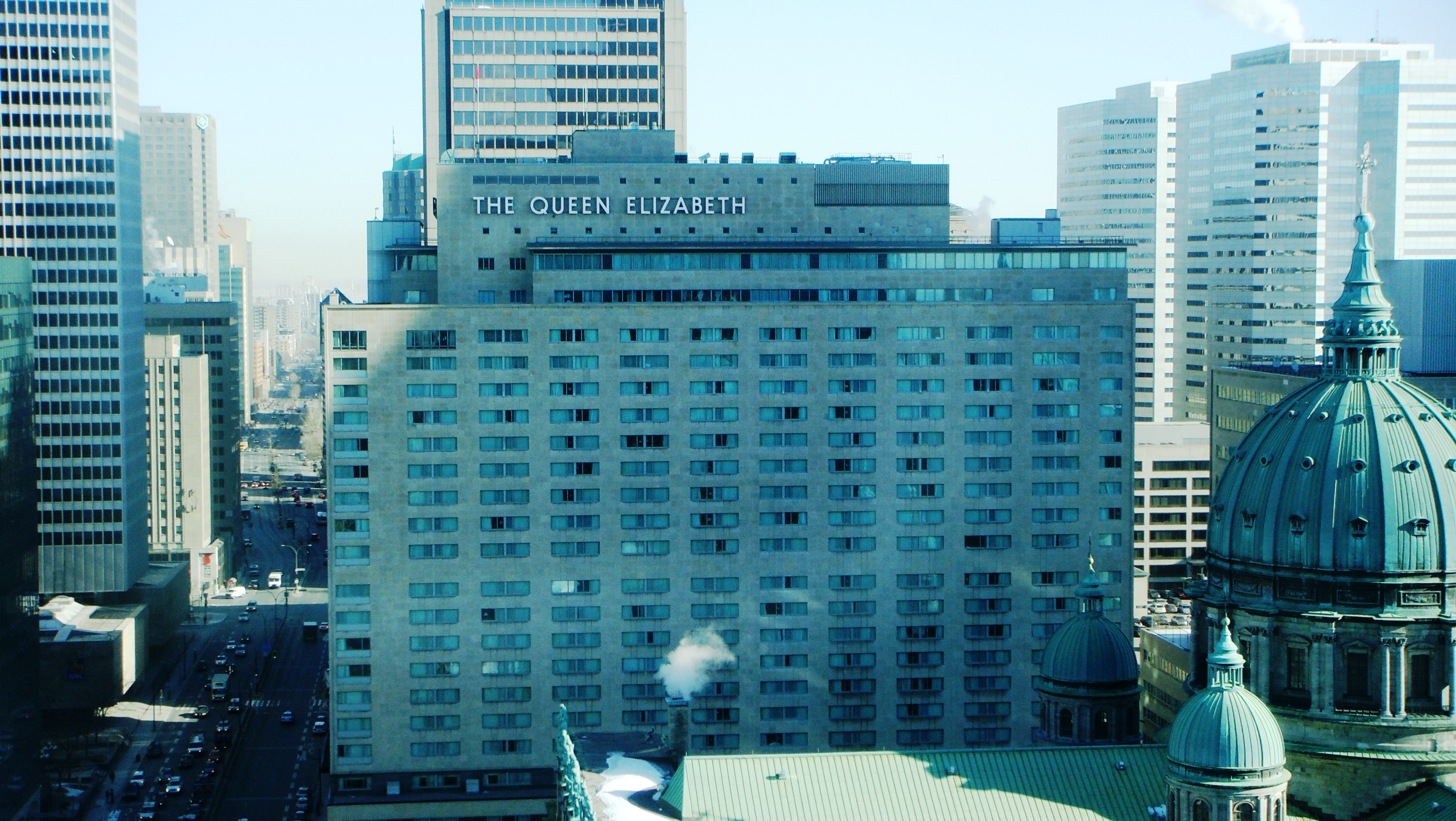
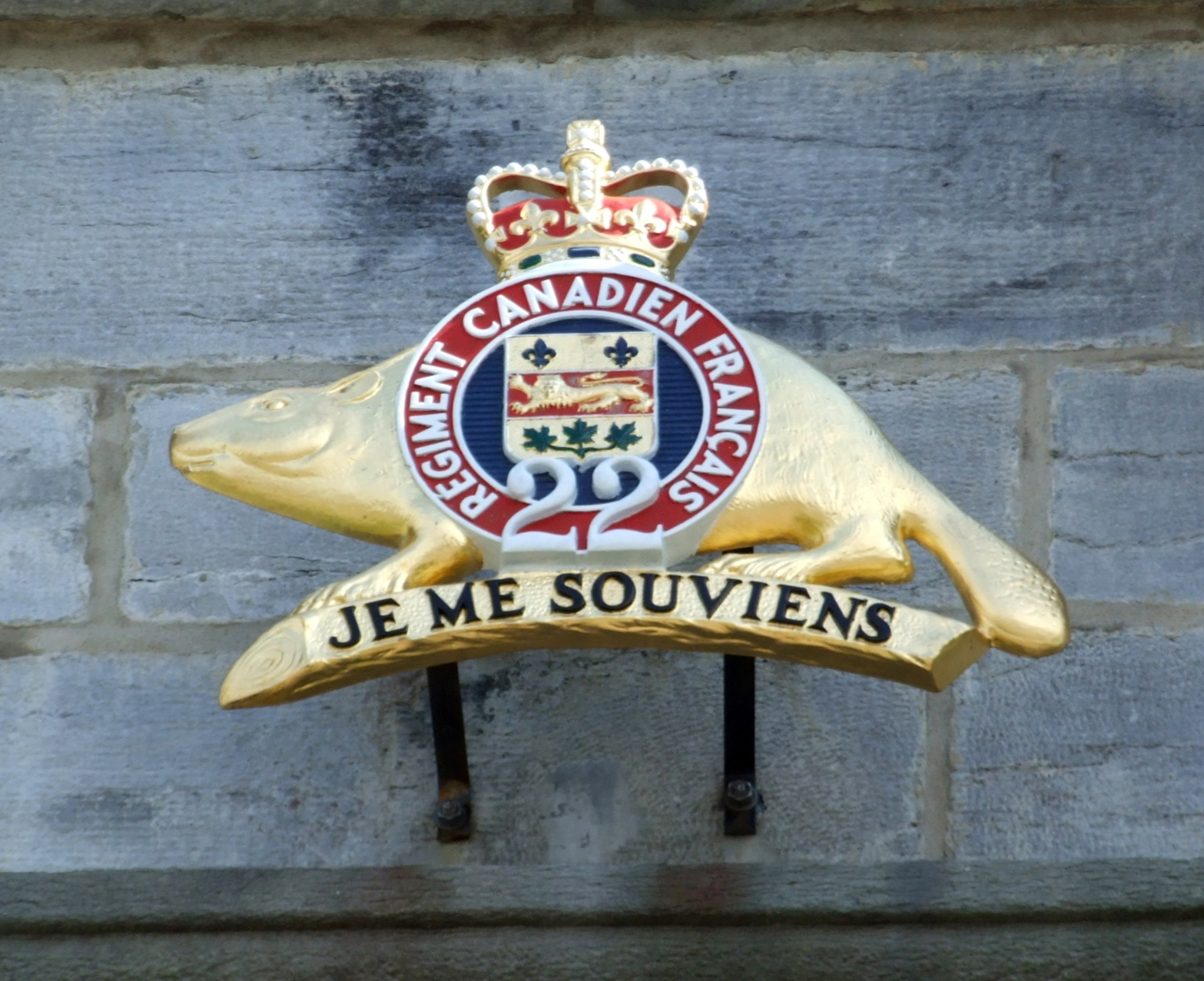
(Clockwise from top) Mount Royal in Montreal, named for King Francis I; Edward VII Monument in Square Phillips, Montreal; the Kent Gate in Quebec City, donated by Queen Victoria; the badge of the Royal 22^{e} Régiment above the entry to the Citadelle, in Quebec City; The Queen Elizabeth Hotel in Montreal, eponymously named for Queen Elizabeth II; the Rupert River, which derives its name from Prince Rupert

Those in the royal family perform ceremonial duties when on a tour of the province; the royal persons do not receive any personal income for their service, only the costs associated with the exercise of these official obligations are funded by both the Canadian and Quebec Crowns in their respective councils.

Monuments around Quebec mark some of those visits, while others honour a royal personage or event. Further, Quebec's monarchical status is illustrated by royal names applied to regions, communities, schools, and buildings, many of which may also have a specific history with a member or members of the royal family; for example, Quebec has at least seven distinct features named for Queen Victoria, including the second largest area in Canada and Grand lac Victoria, at the head of the Ottawa River, south of Val-d'Or. Eleven locations and organizations are named for Victoria's father, Prince Edward, Duke of Kent and Strathearn.

Gifts are also sometimes offered from the people of Quebec to a royal person to mark a visit or an important milestone; for instance, Queen Elizabeth II was in 1955 given the puck with which Maurice Richard scored his 325th career goal—thereby setting a new record—during a game against the Chicago Blackhawks on 8 November 1952.

Associations also exist between the Crown and many private organizations within the province; these may have been founded by a royal charter, received a royal prefix, and/or been honoured with the patronage of a member of the royal family. Examples include the Royal Montreal Curling Club, which was under the patronage of Prince Philip, Duke of Edinburgh, and received its royal designation from King George V in 1924, and McGill University, which was originally constituted as the Royal Institution for the Advancement of Learning through a royal charter from King George III in 1801, before being reconstituted as a university by George IV in 1827.

The main symbol of the monarchy is the sovereign himself, his image (in portrait or effigy) thus being used to signify government authority. A royal cypher or crown may also illustrate the monarch as the locus of authority, without referring specifically to the individual who is king or queen. Further, though neither the monarch nor his viceroy form a part of the constitutions of Quebec's honours, the latter do stem from the Crown as the fount of honour; unlike in all of Canada's other provinces, however, the insignia do not bear any royal emblems. Quebec lawyers may be appointed King's Counsel.

== Popularity ==
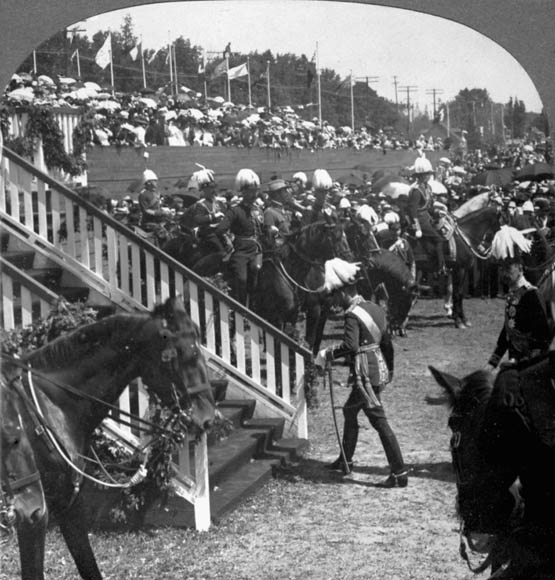
George, Prince of Wales (later King George V) walks to the stage in front of crowds gathered to watch the military review at the Plains of Abraham in Quebec City, July 1908

Before the Quiet Revolution in the 1960s, when the distinction between the Canadian Crown and British imperialism was obscured by Quebec nationalism, the monarchy was relatively popular among Quebecers. The only moment when notable hostility was directed at the Crown was during the Lower Canada Rebellion, between 1837 and 1838, during which the republican rebels expressed personal animosity toward the young Queen Victoria.

Although Donald Mackenzie Wallace, the foreign correspondent for The Times, described a lack of "vigorous cheering" from the crowds in Quebec when Prince George, Duke of Cornwall and York (later King George V), and Princess Mary, Duchess of Cornwall and York (later Queen Mary), toured parts of the province in 1901, the French-Canadian media and nationalist organizations, such as the Saint-Jean-Baptiste Society, presented the royal couple with addresses of welcome. Prince George returned to Quebec seven years later, for the tercentennary of the founding of Quebec City; the events were so popular with Quebec residents that Prime Minister Wilfrid Laurier was led to opine that Quebecers were "monarchical by religion, by habit, and by the remembrance of past history."

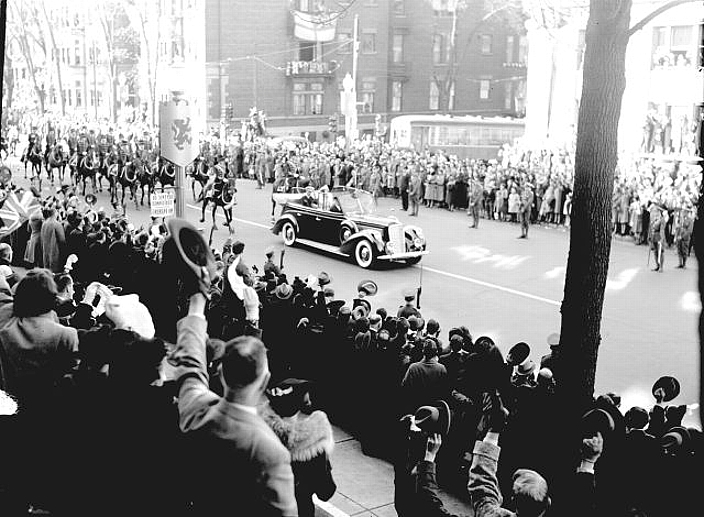
Quebecers cheer for George VI, king of Canada, and Queen Elizabeth as they proceed along Sherbrooke Street in Montreal, 18 May 1939

During the 1939 royal tour by King George VI and his wife, Queen Elizabeth, Francophone newspapers emphasized that French-Canadians were loyal to the Canadian monarch, admired the King and Queen, and did not support British imperialism or view themselves as having assimilated into the British Empire.

Even at the start of the Quiet Revolution, when Queen Elizabeth II visited Quebec City in 1964 and open protest against the Crown was seen for the first time since the 1830s, the supporters far outnumbered the anti-monarchists; The New York Times reported there being between 50 and 100 student protesters, compared to the approximately 50,000 denizens who gave the Queen, as noted by the Montreal Gazette, "a tumultuous welcome". As the decade went on, the monarchy continued to receive support from some corners of Quebec, such as L'Action magazine asserting, “long before Ottawa was seized, as it is now, of the bilingual and bicultural ferment, the Crown was establishing the fact, in all its interventions in Canada, of equality of the two languages beyond the letter of the constitution.”

Recent polls show support for the monarchy is low in Quebec compared to the other provinces.

== Quebec nationalism and the sovereignty movement ==
In the first days of the royal tour of Canada by King George VI and Queen Elizabeth in 1939, which started in Quebec City, the French language newspaper La Presse took issue with the displays of British flags and decorations in Quebec, calling them "imperialistic propaganda". But, this was not anti-monarchical sentiment. Instead, the editorial board wanted for the King's presence to be a foundation for a celebration of Québécois culture, asking, "why don't we, French Canadians, profit from the occasion to manifest our loyalty and attachment to our sovereigns, certainly, but also to our language, our nationality, our rights, our ethnic character. If we must have inscriptions, let them be worded in French. If we cheer, cheer in French."

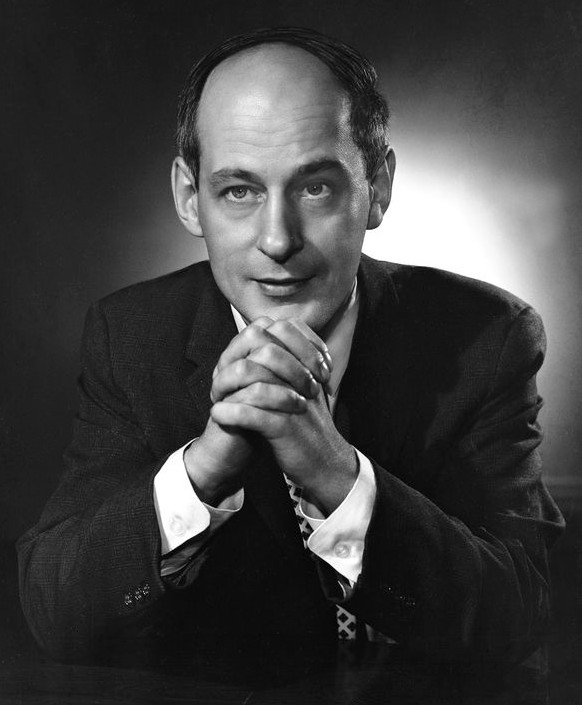
René Lévesque, in 1961, who later became Parti Québécois leader

Advocates of the Quebec sovereignty movement, which emerged in the 1960s, regard the Crown not as a distinct and essential part of the province's national structure—"the last bulwark of democracy," as former Liberal Prime Minister of Quebec Daniel Johnson Jr put it—but, as a federal institution involved in Quebec affairs; for them, the Canadian monarchy is a target of anti-federal, anti-English sentiment. Premier Daniel Johnson, head of the nationalist Union Nationale party, mused about making Quebec a federated republic. In an interview in 1971, René Lévesque, the then-leader of the province's sovereigntist political party, the Parti Québécois, was asked if there would be any role for the monarchy in an independent Quebec. He responded, "are you joking? Why? I have great respect for the Queen [...] But, what the Hell part should monarchy have in Quebec?" Parti Québécois leader Pauline Marois in 2012 called the lieutenant governor—the viceregal figure it was Marois' job to advise—a waste of money and railed against the monarchy as an institution of Anglophones' and Ottawa's dominance. University of Toronto professor Richard Toporoski held the theory that a sovereign, not independent, Quebec would still be under the sovereignty of the Canadian monarch: "the real problem of the Quebec bill is not separation from Canada: Quebec has said that it wishes to preserve common elements—Canadian currency (issued officially by whom?—the Queen of Canada), for example, and the possibility of Quebec citizens being Canadian citizens (and who are Canadian citizens?—subjects of the Queen)."

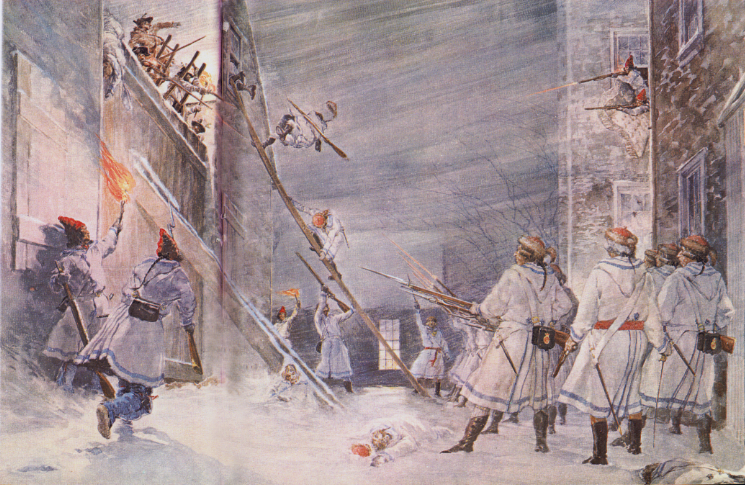
Canadien militiamen, wishing to remain under the Crown, defending Quebec City from attack by American revolutionaries, 31 December 1775

The Canadian monarchy is not recognized by most of those in the sovereignty movement, who refer to it instead still as the "British monarchy" or "English Crown", to play up on the narrative of the British conquest of New France in 1760, ignoring that Quebecers fought during the American Revolution and War of 1812 to stay under the Crown and that the flag of Quebec, which Parti Québécois leader Paul St-Pierre Plamondon said, "represents both the right of Quebecers to exist as a people and the province's democracy", employs French royal symbols.

Members of Canada's royal family have been asked by some Quebec sovereigntists to apologize for acts such as the Acadian Great Upheaval in the mid 18th century (which took place in Nova Scotia and the Crown recognized in 2003) and the patriation of the Canadian constitution in 1982. In 2009, the Saint-Jean-Baptiste Society's Montreal chapter asked Prince Charles to apologize for what it said was the royal family's role in the "cultural genocide of francophones in North America over the last 400 years". The society did not make clear what, exactly, any member of the family had done to that end.

Sovereigntists have also been against the presence of members of the Canadian royal family in Quebec. At the height of the Quiet Revolution, the Quebec press reported that extreme separatists were plotting to assassinate Queen Elizabeth II during her upcoming 1964 tour of the province, as well as to kidnap Premier Jean Lesage's son, should the Queen come to Quebec. Despite fears for the monarch's safety and talk of cancelling the trip, the Queen arrived as planned and, in a speech delivered, in both French and English, to the Legislative Assembly on 10 October, spoke of Canada's two "complementary cultures" and the strength of Canada's two founding peoples. She stated, "I am pleased to think that there exists in our Commonwealth a country where I can express myself officially in French [...] Whenever you sing [the French words of] 'O Canada', you are reminded that you come of a proud race." Still, as her motorcade passed through Quebec City, the route was lined with Quebecers showing their backs to the monarch; others booed her and shouted separatist slogans. Though the protesters were the minority in the crowds gathered to see the Queen (newspapers reporting that those who opposed the visit were students numbering 100 or less in a crowd of 50,000), the provincial police violently dispersed those demonstrators who took to marching through the streets, arresting 36, including some who had been there to show loyalty to the Queen.

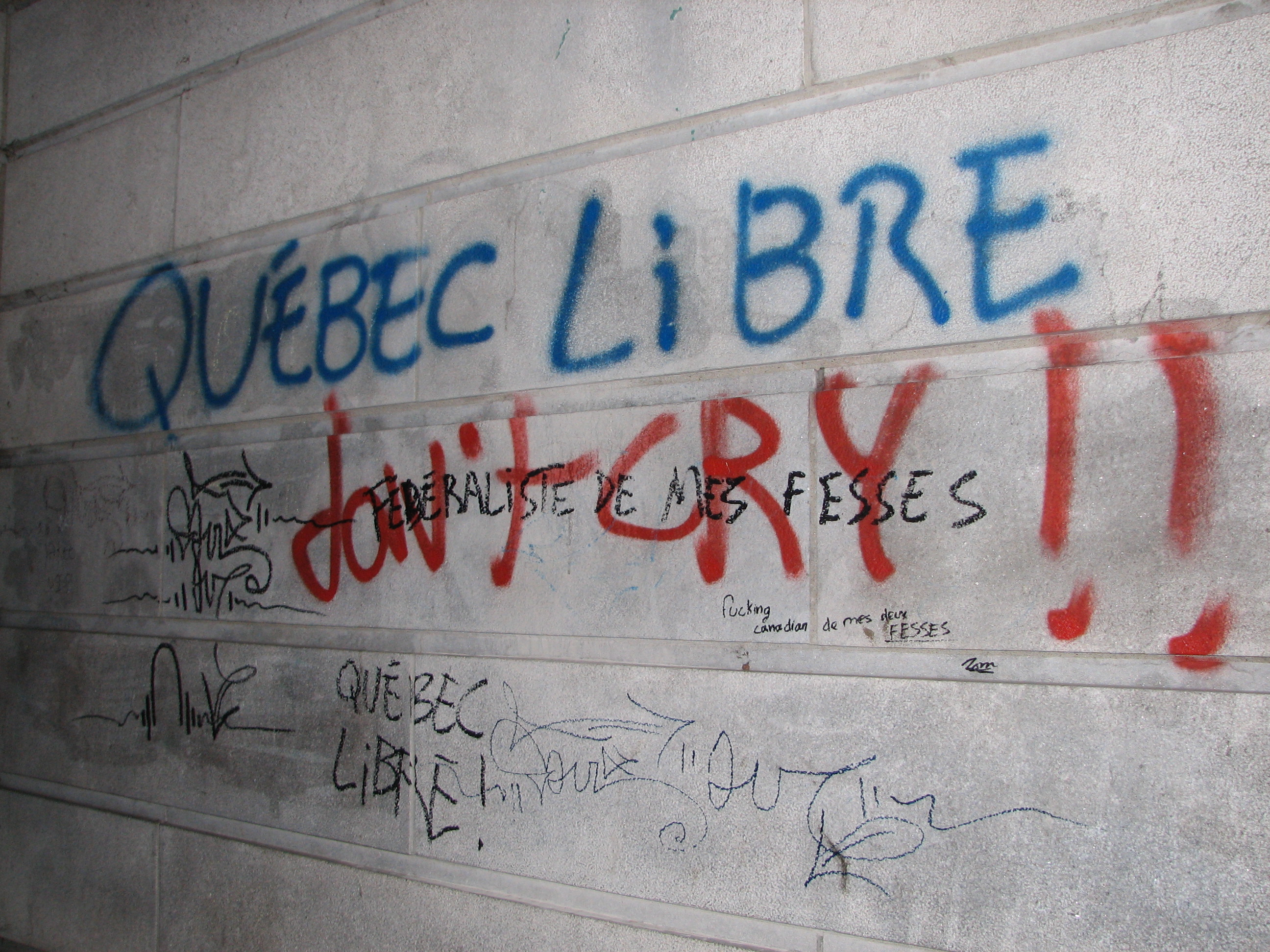
Graffiti in Quebec City reading "Québec libre" ("free Quebec")

Lévesque later sent a letter to Buckingham Palace asking the Queen to refuse Prime Minister of Canada Pierre Trudeau's advice that she open the 1976 Summer Olympics in Montreal; though, she did not oblige the Premier, as he was out of his jurisdiction in offering advice to the sovereign on a federal matter. The premier at the time, Robert Bourassa, who had first pushed Trudeau to ask the Queen to attend, eventually himself became unsettled about how unpopular the move might be with sovereigntists.

Parti Québécois members of the National Assembly also complained in 2006 about federal intervention into a provincial affair and separatists threatened demonstrations after both the city and provincial governments mused about inviting the Queen or another member of the royal family to attend the festivities marking the quatercentenary of the founding of Quebec City, as had been done a century prior. Mario Beaulieu, then vice-president of the Saint-Jean-Baptiste Society, stated, "you can be sure that people will demonstrate in protest [...] We are celebrating the foundation of New France, not its conquest. The monarchy remains a symbol of imperialism and colonialism. Her [the Queen's] presence will not be welcomed", and Gérald Larose, President of the Quebec Sovereignty Council, claimed the monarchy was, "the most despicable, appalling, anti-democratic, imperial, colonial symbol against which all social and individuals rights were obtained through the course of history". Though it was met with dissatisfaction from some officials in Quebec, but with support from 64% of polled individuals in the province, the federal government advised neither the sovereign nor any other royal family member to attend, instead sending Governor General Michaëlle Jean to preside over the fête.

The Saint-Jean-Baptiste Society and Réseau de Résistance du Québécois (RRQ) mounted demonstrations and threw eggs at Canadian soldiers during the visit of Prince Charles and Camilla, Duchess of Cornwall, to The Black Watch (Royal Highland Regiment) of Canada in Montreal, on Remembrance Day, 2009, requiring the intervention of riot police. The RRQ mounted similar, though less violent, protests when Prince William and Catherine, Duchess of Cambridge, visited Montreal and Quebec City in 2011.

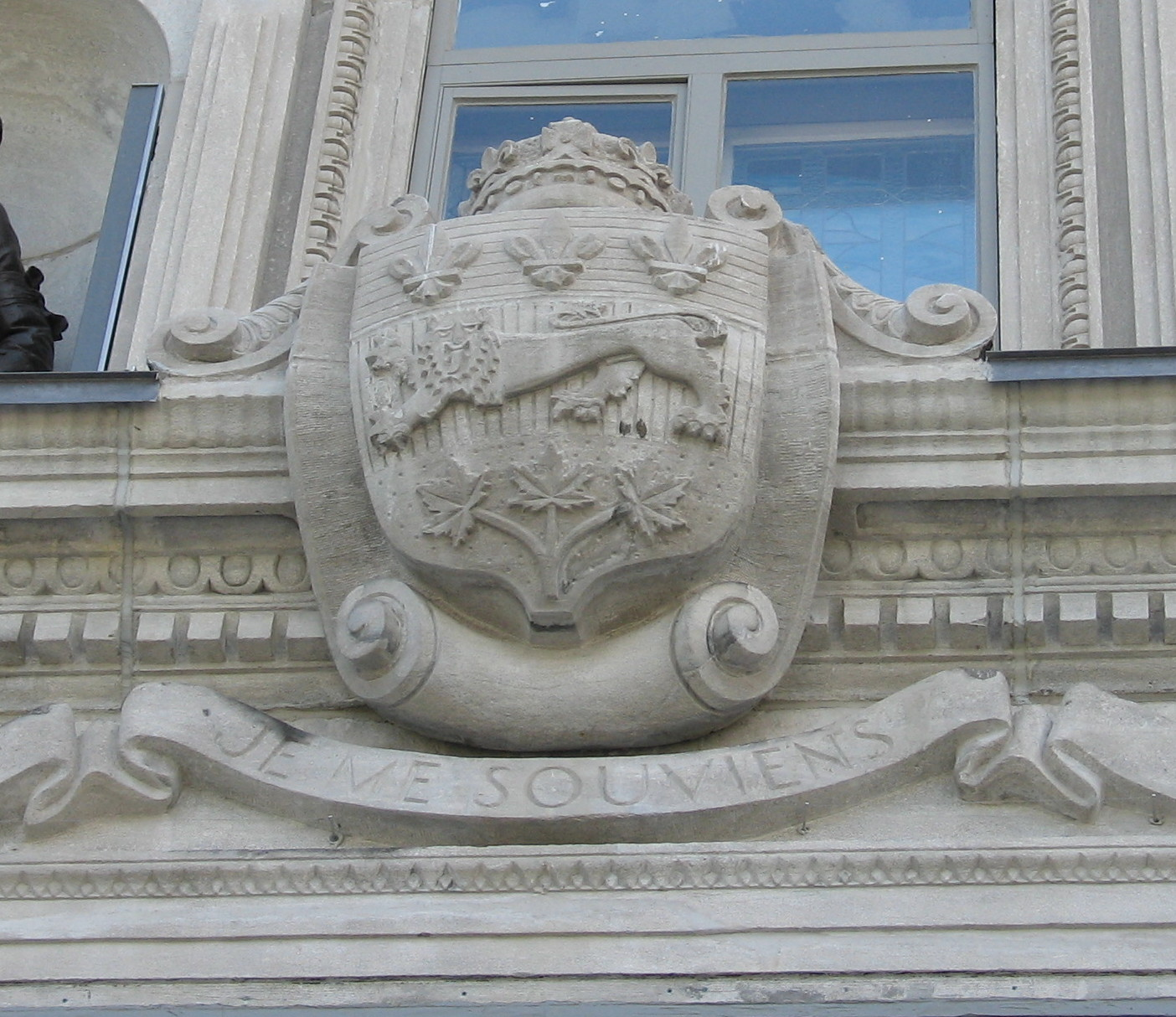
The coat of arms of Quebec, surmounted by the royal Tudor Crown representing the source of the legislature's authority, on the porch around the main entrance to the Parliament Building of Quebec, wherein MLAs have refused to swear allegiance to the King

In 2002, PQ Premier Bernard Landry directed the Executive Council and Lieutenant Governor to not recognize Elizabeth's Golden Jubilee, in protest of the Queen signing the Constitution Act, 1982; separatist demonstrators met the Queen when she entered Gatineau that year. Ten years later, in the Queen's Diamond Jubilee year, Marois proclaimed, "it doesn't bother me at all to attack royalty." Following the death of Elizabeth II, the Premier, François Legault, was criticized by the PQ for having flags at Quebec Crown-owned properties lowered to half-staff.

The PQ has consistently, since 1970, resisted the Oath of Allegiance to the monarch of Canada, as the embodiment of the state order of laws and governance, which all parliamentarians across the country must, by the Canadian constitution, swear before being allowed to take their seats in the relevant legislature. In 1982, when the PQ had a majority in the National Assembly, the Act Respecting the National Assembly of Quebec was granted royal assent, adding a supplementary oath pledging loyalty to the undefined "people of Quebec". Forty years later, after the 2022 election PQ members of the Legislative Assembly, briefly joined by members of the equally separatist Québec solidaire party, refused to recite the oath, rendering them unable to take their seats in the provincial parliament. The legislature, with the nationalist Coalition Avenir Québec in the government benches, passed a law that attempted to amend the Canadian constitution to exempt the entire province from the requirement that legislators swear the Oath of Allegiance. It remains unclear if the law has any effect. after the 2026 election all 59 elected Parti Québécois MNAs did not take the Oath to the King. It was reported to be the first time a governing party did not swear an oath to the monarchy. The Liberals, Québec solidaire, and Conservatives would do the same would follow suit and not swear an oath to the king.

There has been push from Quebec parties for reforms: at a constitutional conference held in Ottawa in February 1968, delegates from Quebec indicated that a provincial president might suit the province better than the Queen and the lieutenant governor. But, the proposal was not accepted. Legault was asked in September 2022 whether the province should eliminate the office of the lieutenant governor. Legault expressed his awareness of calls to "replace" the lieutenant governor before noting the matter was not a priority. Following the appointment of Manon Jeannotte as lieutenant governor in 2023, the National Assembly unanimously voted in support of a non-binding motion to abolish the viceregal office, without proposing any alternative.

In May 2025, The National Assembly of Quebec unanimously voted for a motion calling on Quebec to abolish all ties with the monarchy. Coalition Avenir Québec, Parti Québécois, the Liberals and Québec solidaire voted for the motion.

During the 2026 Quebec general election which the Parti Québécois won, it stated a PQ government would cut off funding to the lieutenant governor of Quebec and abolish the monarchy.

== History ==
=== Pre-colonial ===
Aboriginal groups in what is today Quebec were considered by Europeans to belong to kingdoms—such as along the north shore of the St. Lawrence River, between the Trinity River and the Isle-aux-Coudres, and the neighbouring kingdom of Canada, which stretched west to the Island of Montreal—and the leaders of these communities, particularly those chosen through heredity, were referred to as kings.

=== The first French colonies and the Hudson's Bay Company ===
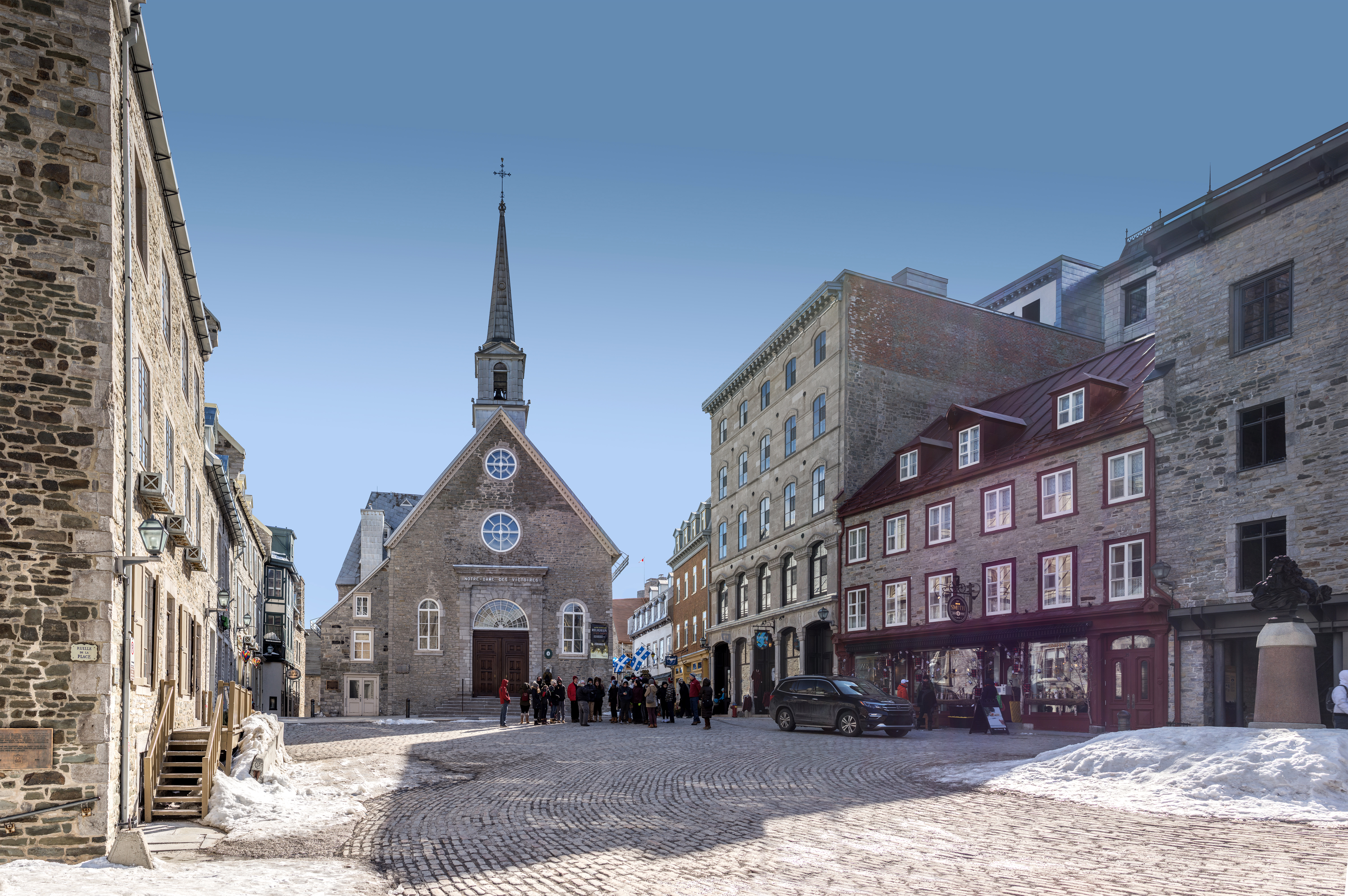
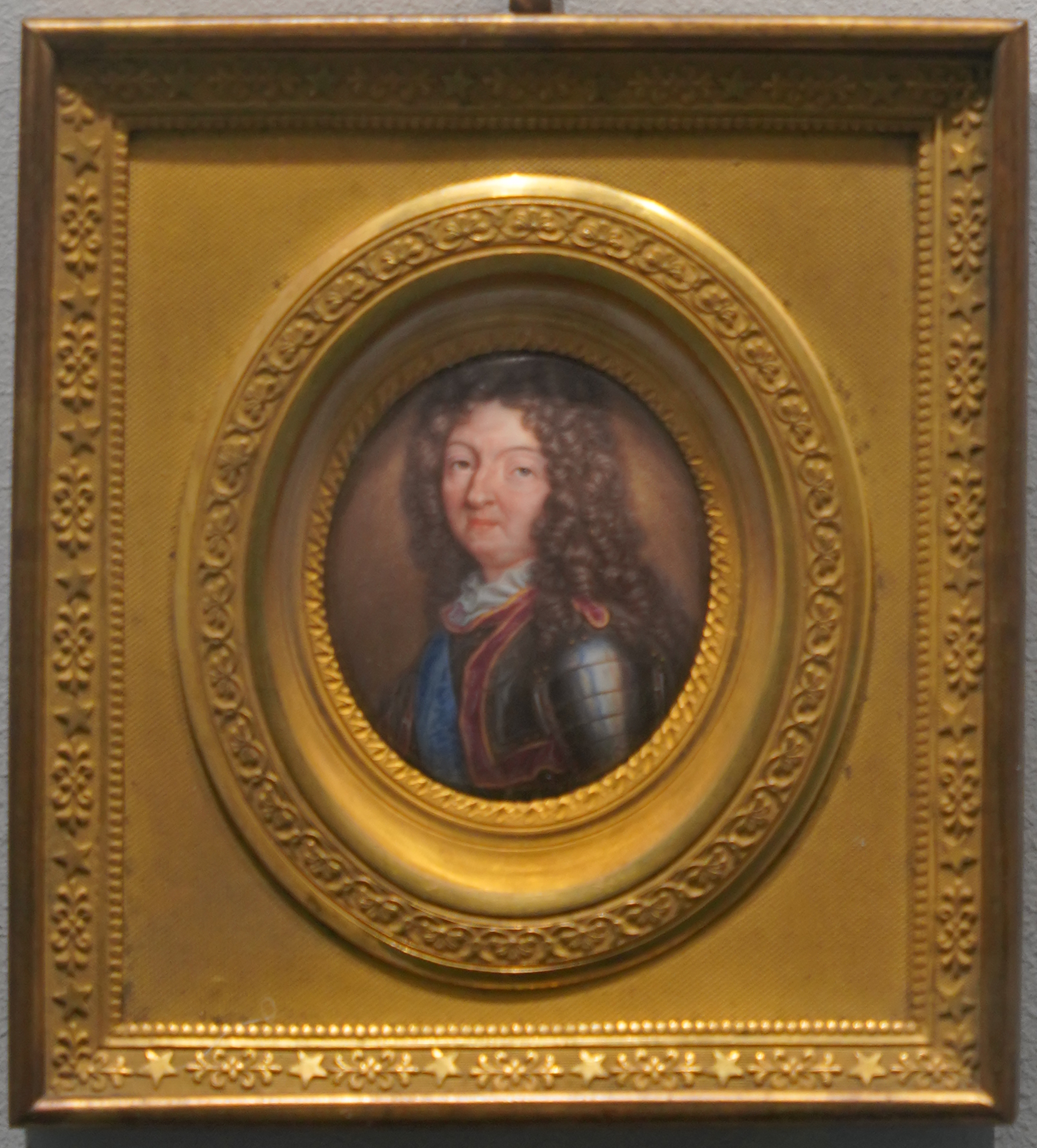
(Clockwise from top) Notre-Dame-des-Victoires Church, on Place Royale in Quebec City, the square being named for King Louis XIV; a variant of the French King's arms used in New France; portrait of Louis XIV in the late 17th century, approximately when New France was made a province of France

The monarchy that exists in Quebec today can trace its ancestral lineage back to the claims of King Henry VII in 1497 and King Francis I in 1534; both being blood relatives of the current Canadian monarch. While the first French colonies in North America were established at Acadia (today Nova Scotia) and Port Royal, French explorers thereafter expanded the King's territory inland and, in 1541, Jean-François Roberval was appointed as Viceroy of Canada, to represent King Henry IV. In 1608, Quebec City was founded and, seven years later, it was, on the recommendation of its founder, Samuel de Champlain, designated as a royal capital of the French empire in the Americas; Place Royale is named for the King. Champlain was installed in 1627 as the representative of the King in New France, making him the first in an unbroken line of viceroys ending at the incumbent governor general of Canada today.

Champlain surrendered on 16 July 1629 to the English privateer and friend of King Charles I, David Kirke, as, at the time, the population of New France was on the brink of starvation and neither man was aware that peace had already been reached between France, Scotland, and England in the Thirty Years' War. Upon learning that hostilities had ceased before Quebec's capture, Champlain argued that Kirke's seizure had been unlawful and, in 1632, Charles I agreed to return New France in exchange for King Louis XIII paying the dowry of Charles' wife, Queen Henrietta, which was specifically included in the Treaty of Saint-Germain-en-Laye. As a consolation, Kirke was knighted by Charles the following year.

In 1663, New France was designated by King Louis XIV as a royal province of France itself, ruled by the King through his appointed Conseil souverain, which included the governor general as the monarch's stand-in. One of the king's decrees, intended to augment, as well as level the gender imbalance of, the population of New France in the 1660s, was to send between seven and nine hundred women, known as the filles du roi (Daughters of the King), to the province, each with dowry, new clothing, and paid passage to the New World. As the population increased, infrastructure was built, such as the Chemin du Roi (King's Highway), between Montreal and Quebec City, and the Cathedral-Basilica of Notre-Dame de Québec, in the welfare of which the King took great interest. This type of French royal patronage extended through the 18th century; for example, from 1713 until 1758, Île-Royale was a project of King Louis XIV and King Louis XV, much of the financing for infrastructure—some 20 million livres—being provided by the monarchs (their names therefore appearing on such works).

King Charles II in 1670 founded the Hudson's Bay Company by a royal charter that applied to the entire Hudson's Bay drainage basin, including much of what is today northern Quebec. The King gave governorship of the company to his cousin, Prince Rupert of the Rhine, and the territory came to be known as Rupert's Land. This area was eventually bought by Canada from the United Kingdom and, in 1898 and 1912, parts were put in the jurisdiction of the Crown in Right of Quebec, to form the province's current borders.

=== Transfer to the British Crown ===
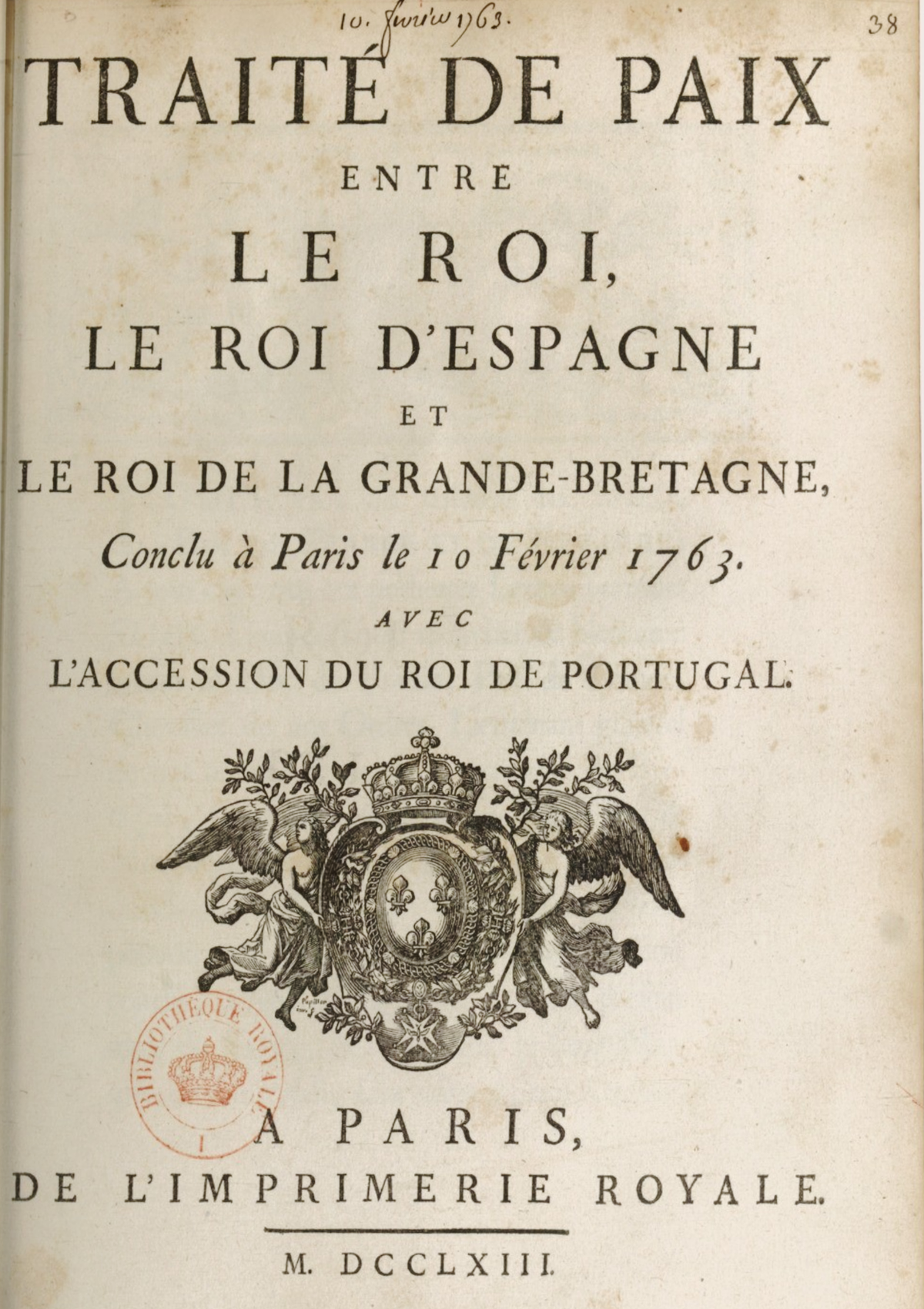
The Treaty of Paris, by which King Louis XV gave New France to King George III

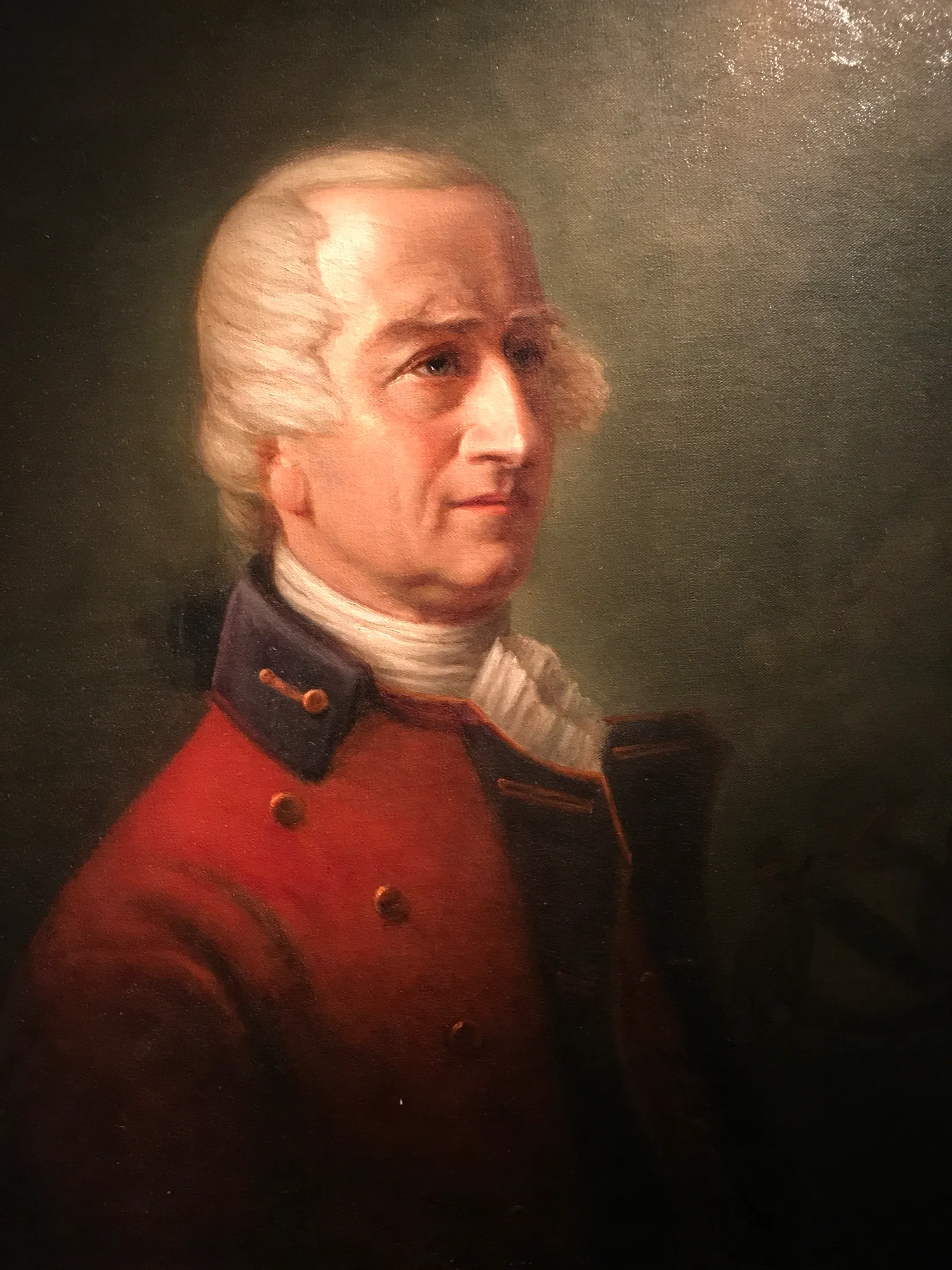
Guy Carlton, Governor of the Province of Quebec from 1768 to 1778

In the negotiations forming the Treaty of Paris in 1763, France relinquished New France in favour of its territory of Guadeloupe; King Louis XV found defence of the Canadian territory to be too much of a burden. It was with the signing of the treaty that the area that is today Quebec moved from under the sovereignty of the French Crown to that of the British Crown. However, King George III had previously allowed Catholicism within the laws of Great Britain and the Test Acts, which blocked Catholics from governmental, judicial, and bureaucratic appointments, were relaxed in Quebec. Still, George faced the challenge of persuading his French Catholic subjects to follow an English Protestant king.

As such, George issued the Royal Proclamation of 1763, which established an appointed colonial government and served as the basis for the constitution of the Province of Quebec until 1774. The King then, with the support of, and influenced by, his governor in the Province of Quebec, Guy Carlton (who had spent years convincing British officials to abandon their assimilationist policies), pushed for the passage of the Quebec Act in 1774, which was considered progressive for its time. Roman Catholics were granted religious and political freedoms that their compatriots in the United Kingdom would not have for another 50 years. French language rights were recognized and French civil law continued to apply in local disputes; British law was used only in criminal cases. This established the tradition of Canadian constitutional law protecting linguistic, religious, and legal rights in Quebec.

=== The American Revolution ===
The Royal Proclamation and Quebec Act were regarded by American colonists as two of the Intolerable Acts that were a catalyst for the American Revolution. But, the American hostility toward the spirit of those laws led most Québécois to reject the revolution; Quebec militiamen fought alongside British soldiers in repelling invasions by the republican revolutionaries and the residents of Montreal, which had fallen to General Richard Montgomery, did not take well to the American military presence, the Catholic clergy specifically asserting that the Quebec Act had given them what they wanted. Most of the peasant habitants, though, aided the Americans.

Also seeking the protection of the Crown, some 10,000 refugees—who became known as United Empire Loyalists—fled the Thirteen Colonies during, and the United States after, the conflict in order to settle in Quebec on land promised to them by the King-in-Council, much of it in what is today the Eastern Townships. It was Governor Carlton who officially applied the term United Empire Loyalist to these refugees and allowed them to use the post-nominal letters UE, stating "that it was his wish to put the mark of honour upon the families who had adhered to the unity of the Empire."

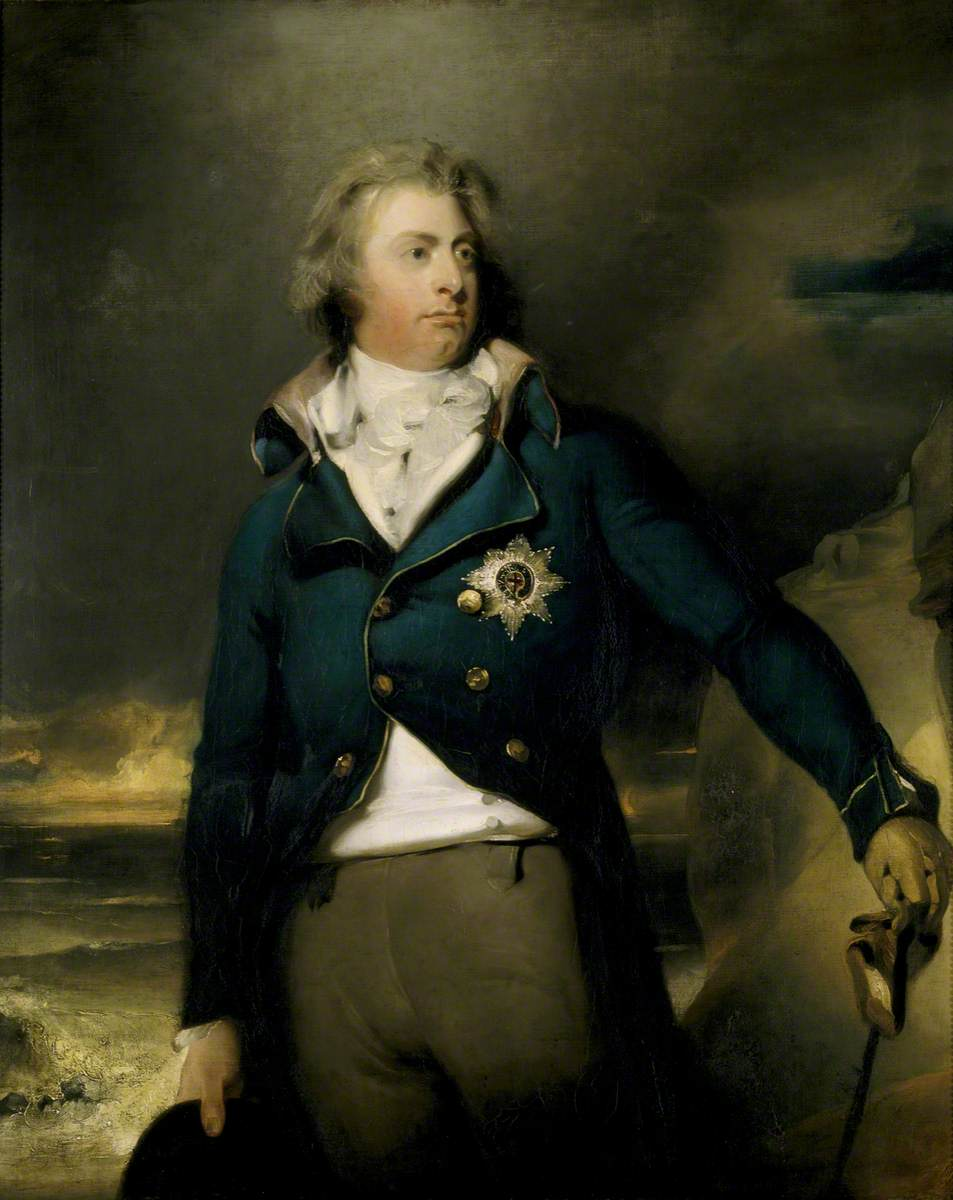
Prince William Henry, between 1790 and 1795

Prince William Henry (later King William IV) visited Quebec in 1787, while in the Canadas in charge of his frigate, HMS Pegasus. He travelled as far inland as Cornwall (in present-day Ontario). While there, the Prince encouraged the United Empire Loyalists to settle the region that later made up Upper Canada. Nearby, he also received a reception from members of the First Nations communities. Of Quebec, the Prince wrote in a letter to his father, King George III, on 9 October 1787:

"As for the Province of Canada, it vastly surpasses all the accounts I can give to Your Majesty of its magnitude, beauty, and fertility; the province in extent is larger than all of Europe; the views in the summer are magnificent and, where, in England, the eye commands a view of ten miles, in Canada, for many leagues, the corn and the sky appear to meet. The ground is rich and, if the industrious Englishman tilled it, instead of the lazy Canadian, it would be inestimable. The country about Quebec is vastly inferior in beauty and richness to that about Montreal. My time was too short this year to go higher up than Montreal; but, next summer, I shall most certainly proceed as far as possible."

=== The residence of Prince Edward ===
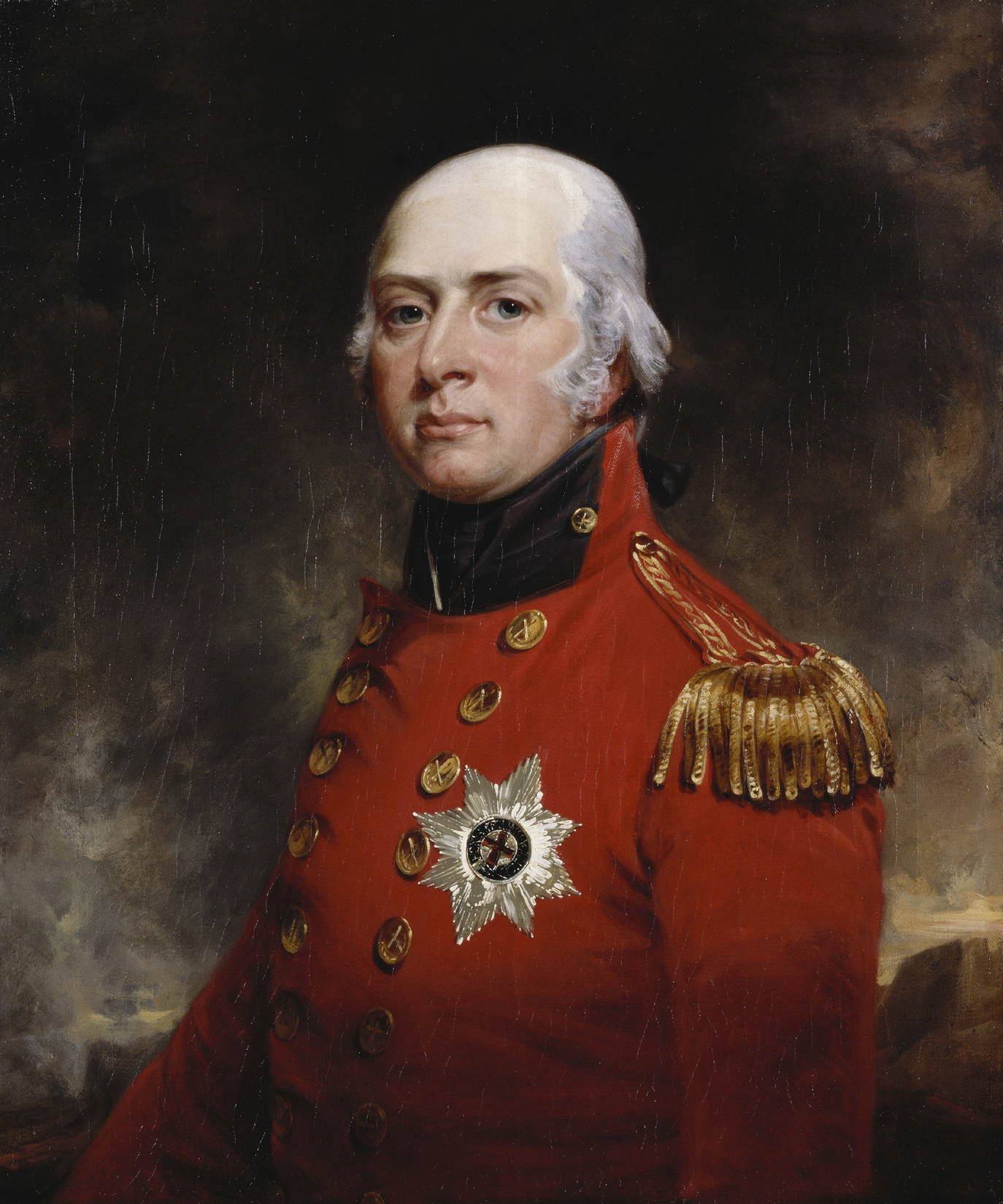
A 1799 portrait of Prince Edward, who lived in Quebec City between 1791 and 1793

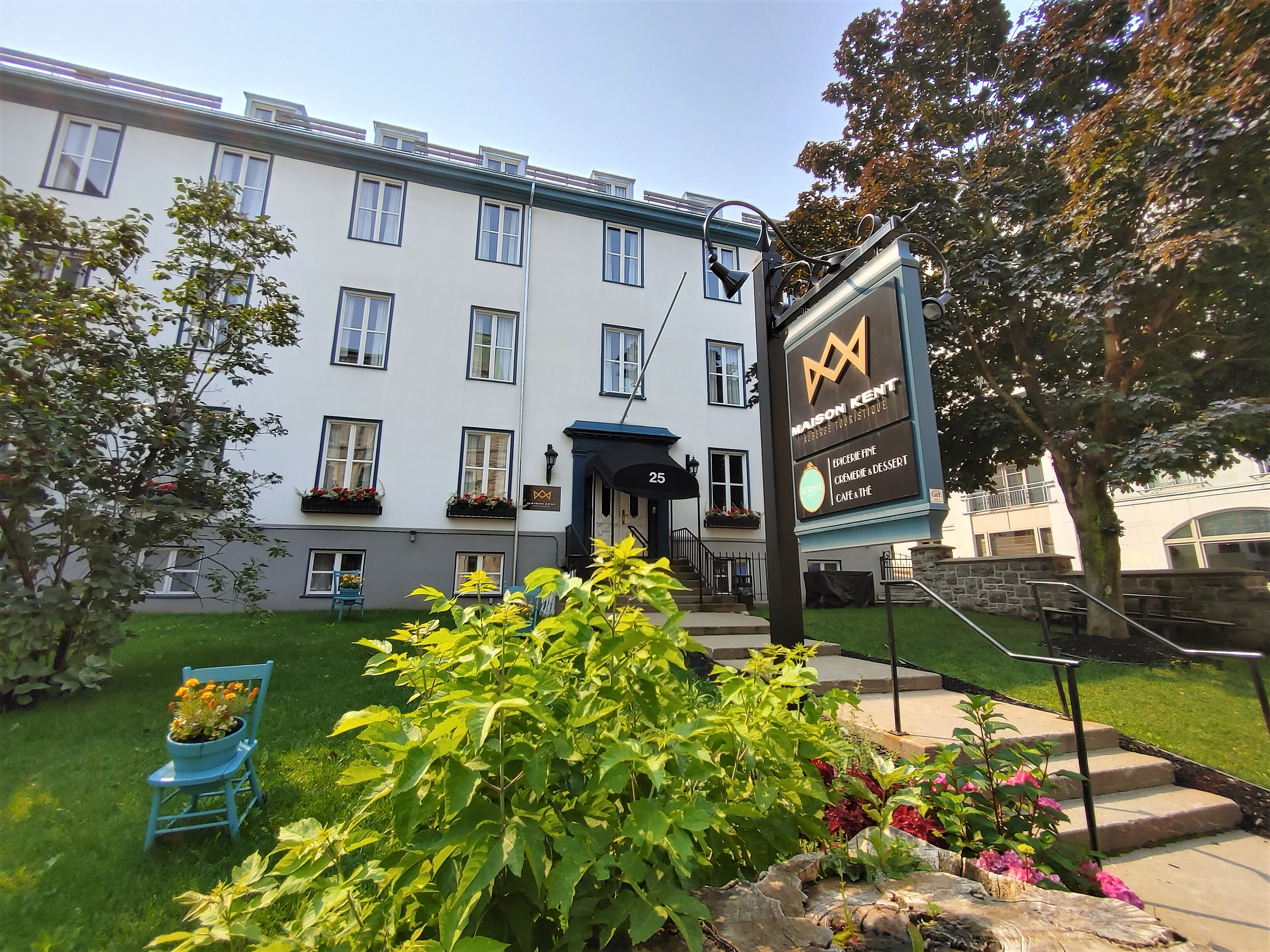
The Duke of Kent House in Quebec City, where Prince Edward resided for two years

One of King George III's sons, Prince Edward (the father of Queen Victoria), lived in Quebec City between 1791 and 1793, having requested a transfer from Gibraltar to the Canadian colonies, to act as colonel for the 7th Regiment of Foot. Upon Edward's arrival, Carlton, by then Governor General of the Canadas, used the Prince's status to ease the concerns of 40 First Nations chiefs who had travelled to Quebec City to complain about border incursions by the Americans, presenting Edward to the Indigenous leaders and proclaiming, "brothers! Here is Prince Edward, son of our King, who has just arrived with a chosen band of his warriors to protect this country." The Governor General then appointed Edward as second-in-command of the British forces in the colonies.

Edward became a part of society in Lower Canada, being able to associate with French Canadiens, Anglo elites, and United Empire Loyalist refugees from the United States, alike, and he toured much of the colony, visiting places such as Beauport, Fort Chambly, Lachine, and Île aux Noix, and occasionally spending holidays at Montmorency Falls. The Prince even had a French-Canadian mistress, Julie de Saint-Laurent, with whom it is thought he sired two children. Edward also became close with Louis d'Irumberry de Salaberry, his wife, Françoise-Catherine, and their four sons, including Charles de Salaberry; the Prince nurturing the young men's military careers.

After touring other parts of the Canadas in August 1791, Prince Edward returned to Quebec City in time to witness the proclamation of the Constitutional Act, which split the Province of Quebec into Upper and Lower Canada, and act as an observer for the election of the first Legislative Assembly of the latter, in Charlesbourg in June 1792. There, he witnessed a riot break out between two groups at the polling station and, in reaction, entreated the public, speaking in French, "I urge you to unanimity and concord. Let me hear no more of the odious distinction of English and French. You are all His Britannic Majesty's beloved Canadian subjects." It was the first known use of the term Canadian to mean both French and English settlers in the Canadas. Edward also oversaw the establishment of the Cathedral of the Holy Trinity, a project of personal interest to his father, the King.

On the outbreak of the French Revolutionary War, Edward was promoted to major-general and ordered to the Caribbean in January 1794. He returned to the Canadas in the summer of the same year, but to Nova Scotia, staying there until just after the turn of the century.

=== The War of 1812 ===
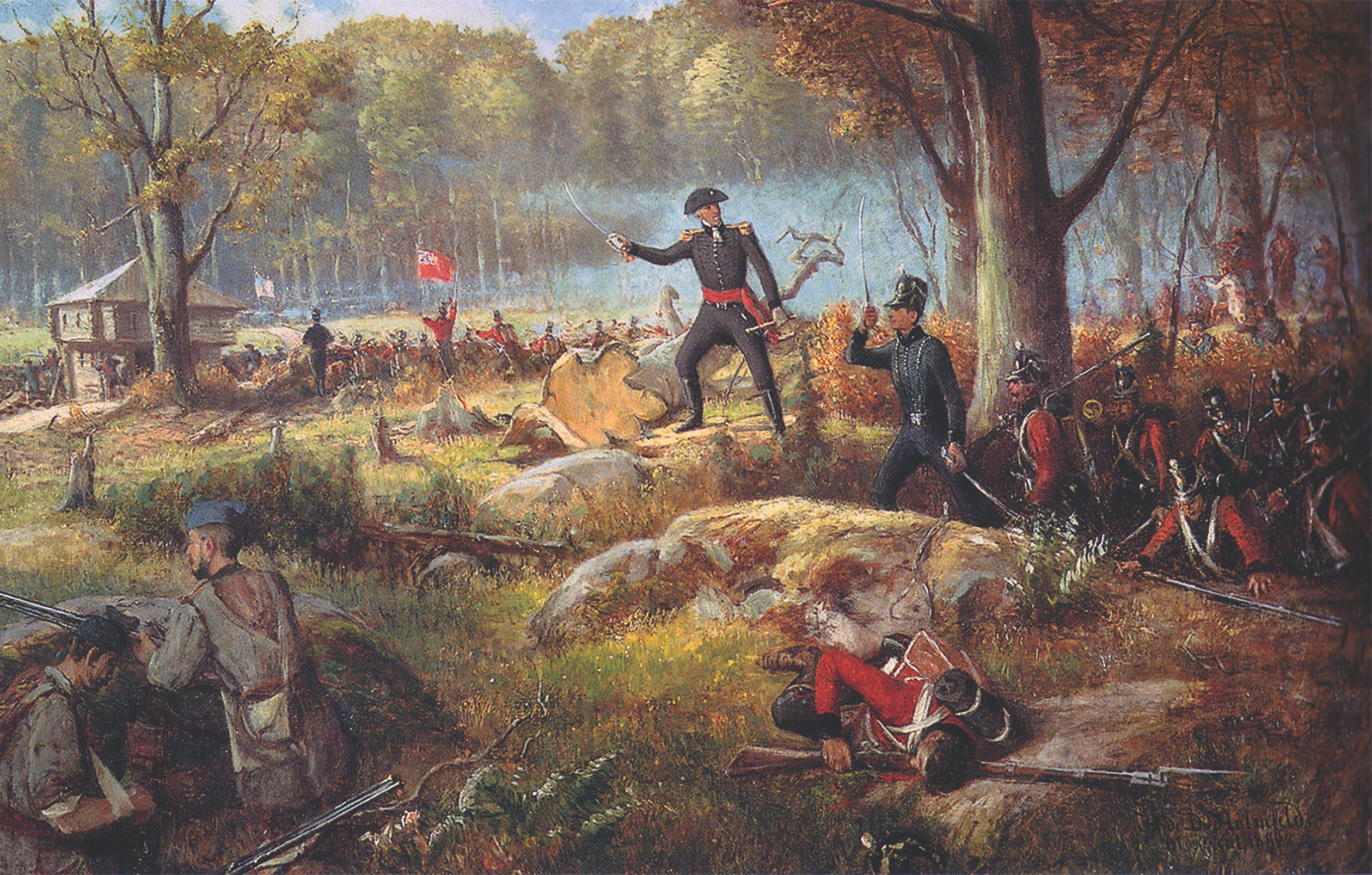
The Canadian Voltigeurs fighting to keep Lower Canada (today Quebec) under the Crown at the Battle of the Chateauguay, 26 October 1813

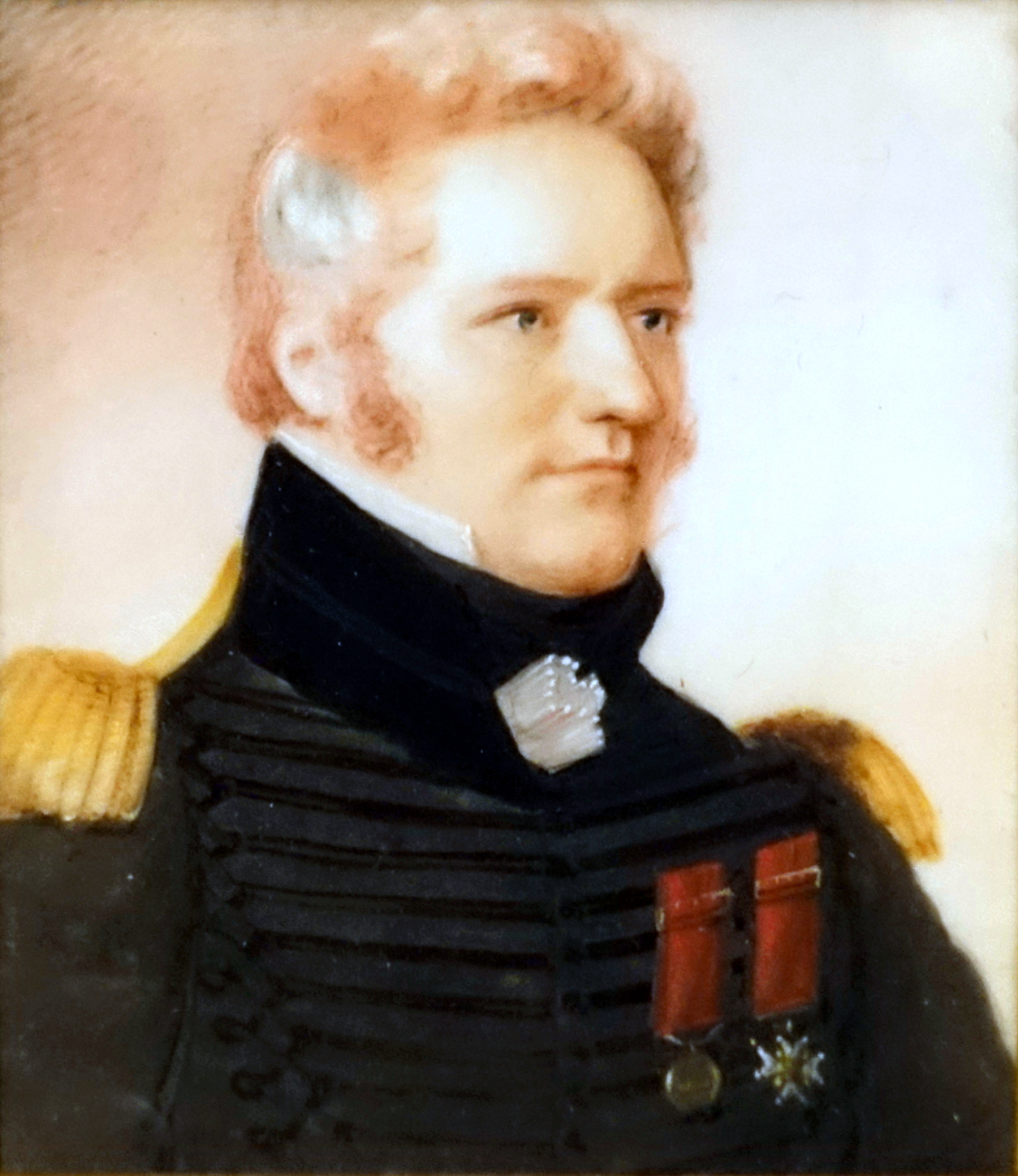
Lieutenant Colonel Charles de Salaberry, commander of the Canadian Voltigeurs and protégé of Prince Edward, Duke of Kent and Strathearn

The United States aimed to conquer the Canadas in the War of 1812; all the American parties involved assumed their troops would be greeted as liberators. Thomas Jefferson believed taking "Canada this year, as far as [...] Quebec, will be a mere matter of marching". Henry Dearborn, who'd been part of Benedict Arnold's failed expedition to Quebec in the American Revolution, trumpeted his belief that a disaffected French-Canada would be unwilling to support the British Crown over the United States. However, anti-Catholicism also caused many to oppose annexing predominantly Catholic Lower Canada, believing its inhabitants unfit "for republican citizenship".

Sure enough, as with their counterparts in Upper Canada, Lower Canadians rebuffed the American invaders. In the Legislative Assembly, members of the Parti Canadien believed that the interests of French-Canadians were best served by remaining under the Crown and, so, gave their support to the Militia Act. The Francophone bourgeoisie agreed with remaining loyal to the King, to continue to enjoy British liberty and to fight off the "immoral and excessively democratic American republic." At least one influential member of the clergy—Jean-Jacques Lartigue—appealed to nationalism in attempting to convince habitants to fight for the "honour of the King". However, there was a significant resistance among farmers to enter the militia, even as they showed loyalty to George III. After Léveillé, a habitant, was arrested for ignoring demands that he present himself for militia duty, his compatriots surrounded the carriage in which he was being transported and cheered, "vive le roi", when their demand for Léveillé's release was successful. A group of some 400 habitant gathered at Lachine on 1 July 1812, demanding to know the truth about the Militia Act; some, again, shouting, "vive le roi", prompting Chaboillez, a government agent, to inform the men that their cheers for the King were blasphemous. After a riot broke out at Lachine (because the crowd felt local officials were abusing their power, rather than as an act of rebellion against the Crown itself), Lartigue was sent there and to Pointe Claire to preach, concluding his oration at the latter by asking the parishioners to repeat after him a declaration of their loyalty to their beloved King.

The Canadian Voltigeurs were raised to fight for the Crown; Captain Perrault attempted to recruit habitant men by telling them they had to fight for the great honour of the King. It consisted of 1,530 British and Canadian regulars, volunteers, militia, and Mohawk warriors from Lower Canada, commanded by Charles de Salaberry, the protégé of Prince Edward, Duke of Kent and Strathearn. The unit received the name voltigeurs, a French word meaning "vaulter" or "leaper", because almost all the soldiers and most of the officers were Francophone. The Duke of Kent made certain to recognize de Salaberry's leadership in the victory of the Voltigeurs over American attackers at the Battle of the Chateauguay, seeing that de Salaberry was appointed a Commander of the Order of the Bath after the war's end, with the Treaty of Ghent, in 1815.

=== Rebellion and responsible government ===
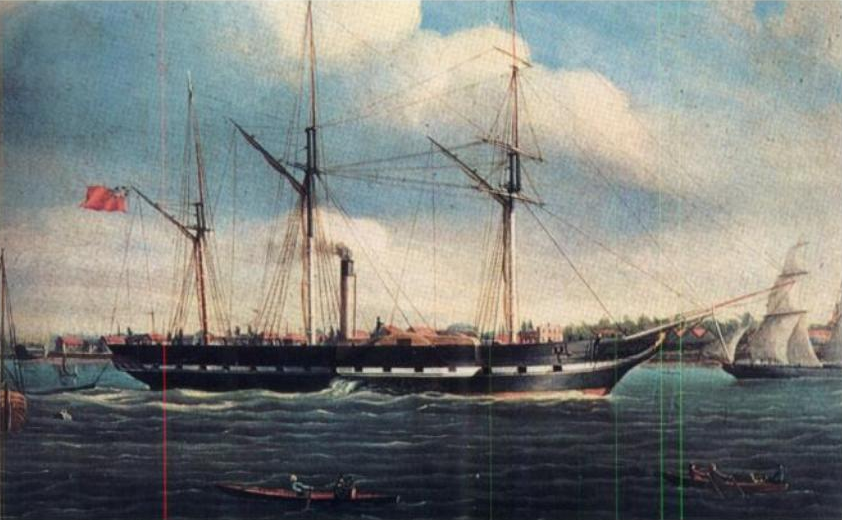
The SS Royal William, named for King William IV, on the St. Lawrence River, 1834

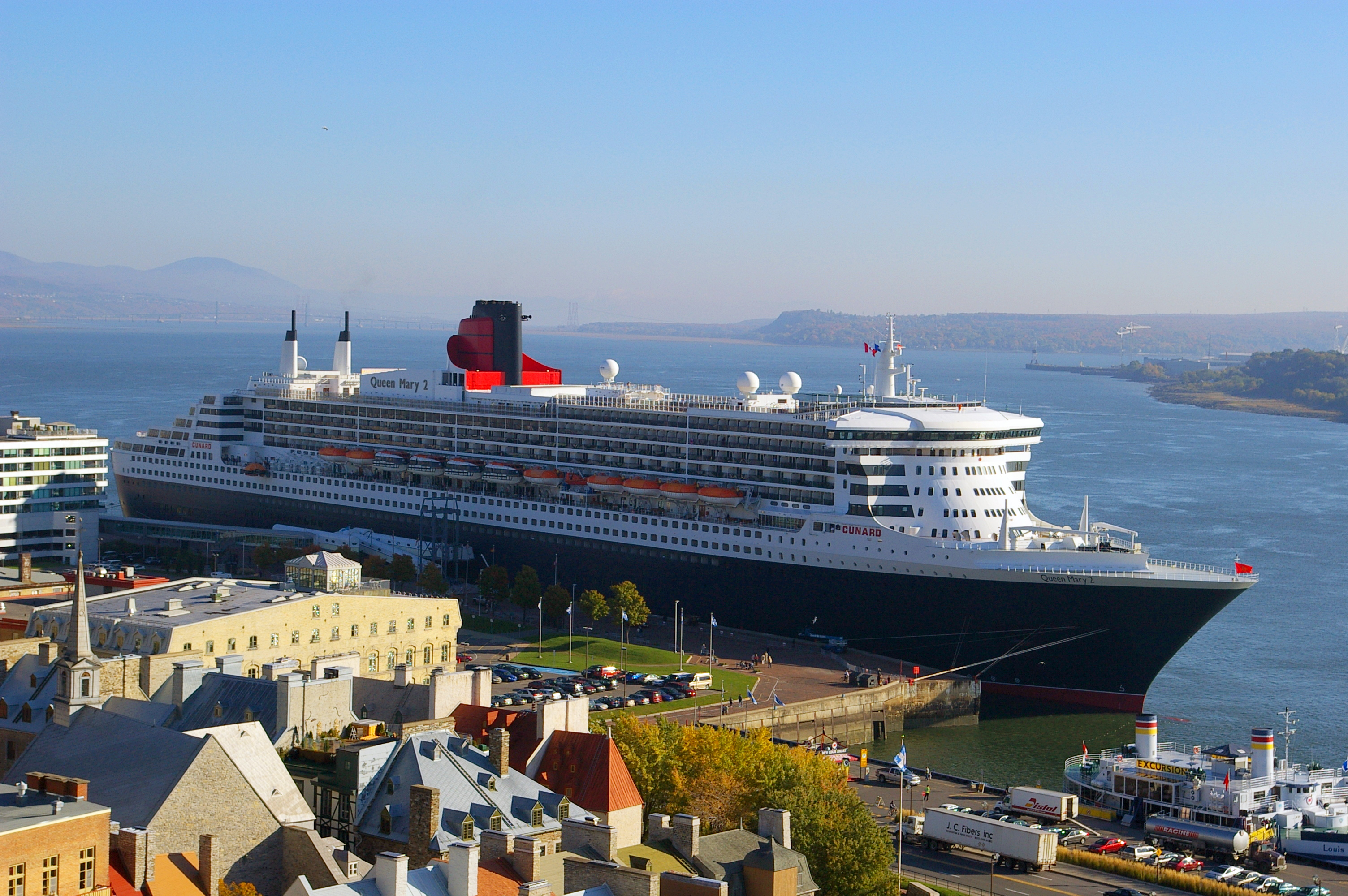
The RMS Queen Mary 2, named for Queen Mary, at Quebec City, 2007

The SS Royal William, named for the new king, William IV, and built at Cap-Blanc, Lower Canada, was launched on 27 April 1831 by Louisa, the Lady Alymer, wife of the Governor General of British North America, the Lord Aylmer. It was the largest passenger ship in the world at the time and became the first to cross the Atlantic Ocean almost entirely by steam power. One of the co-owners of the Royal William was Samuel Cunard, from Nova Scotia, who would go on to found the Cunard Line, which would eventually launch the RMS Queen Mary (1936), RMS Queen Elizabeth (1940), Queen Elizabeth 2 (1969), RMS Queen Mary 2 (2004), MS Queen Victoria (2007), MS Queen Elizabeth (2010), and MS Queen Anne (2024).

Through the 1820s and 1830s, British Prime Minister the Viscount Melbourne mooted ideas of introducing greater democracy to Lower Canada, by way of devolving powers to the Legislative Council. This greatly alarmed the King, by now William IV, who feared it would lead to the loss of the colony, and, at first, he bitterly opposed these proposals. The King exclaimed to the Earl of Gosford, Governor General-designate of the Canadas, "mind what you are about in Canada [...] Mind me, my Lord, the Cabinet is not my Cabinet; they had better take care or, by God, I will have them impeached." Nevertheless, William approved his ministers' recommendations for reform.

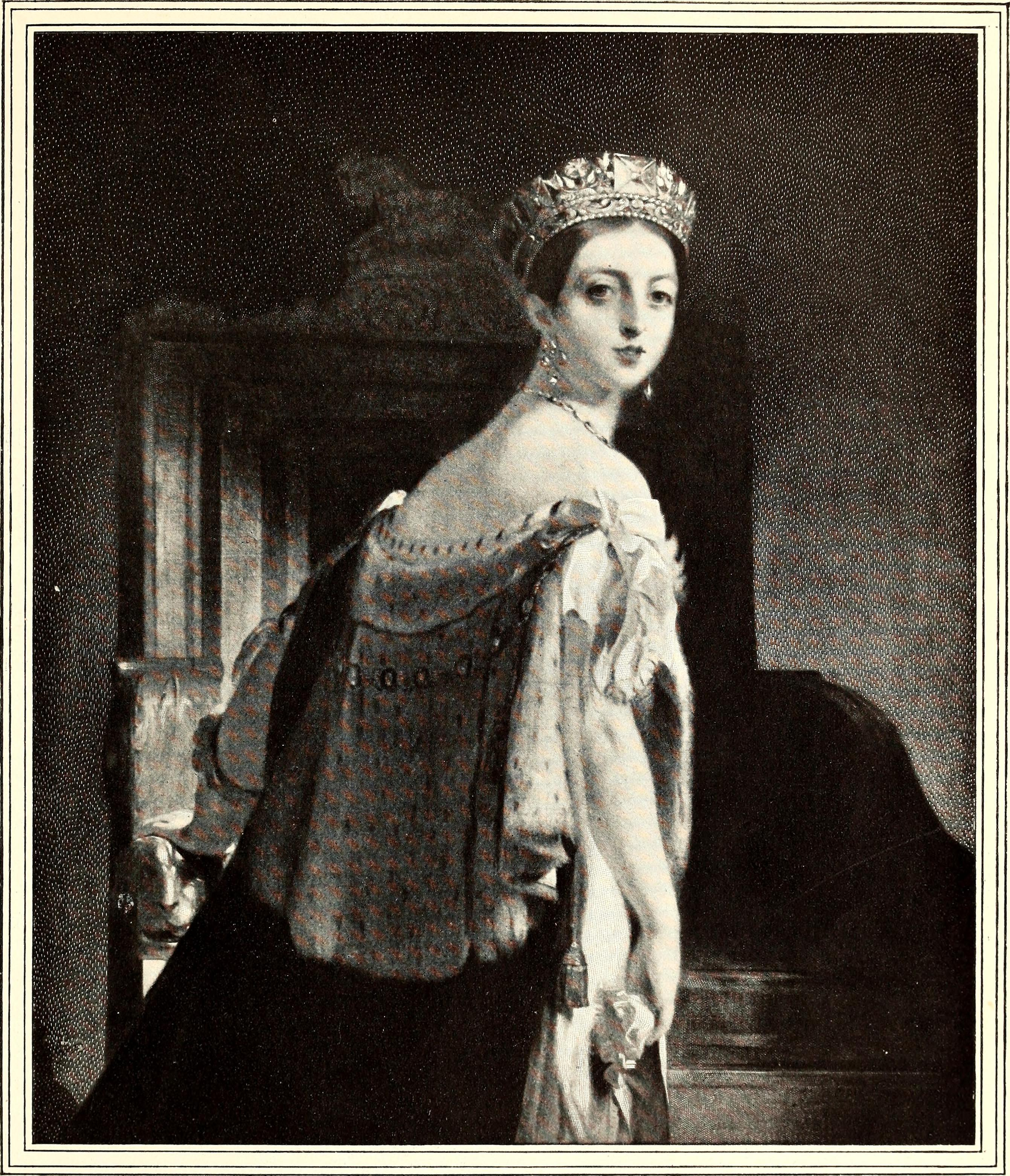
Queen Victoria in 1838

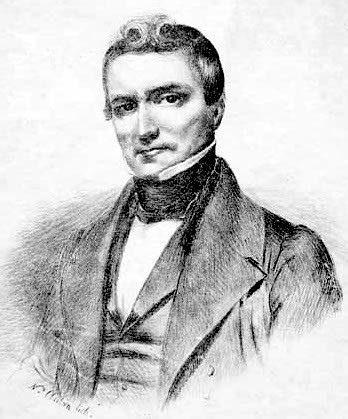
Louis-Joseph Papineau in 1840

Still, Louis-Joseph Papineau began agitating for Lower Canada to become a republic modelled on the United States. This concept spread through the colony and Queen Victoria, who had acceded to the throne in 1837, became a target of the revolutionaries' hostility. Rebellion broke out that year and were put down in 1838. Of the conflicts, the Queen wrote in her diary, "the news are, I grieve to say, very bad from Canada; that is to say, rumours and reports by the papers; though, we have no official reports. But [Prime Minister] Lord Melbourne hopes it may not be so bad as it is rumoured. There certainly is open rebellion." As a sign of goodwill with which to begin her reign and to mark her coronation, the Queen used her royal prerogative to pardon many of the rebels and continued to do so through the 1840s.

The Queen's representative in British North America, the Earl of Durham, penned a report containing recommendations for change following the Lower and Upper Canada Rebellions. Based on that document, the Act of Union 1840 was passed by the parliament at Westminster and proclaimed in effect by Queen Victoria on 10 February 1841, thus renaming Lower and Upper Canada as Canada East (today Quebec) and Canada West (today Ontario), respectively, and merging them to form the Province of Canada, with a governor general to represent the monarch and housed at Monklands. Five years later, the Legislative Assembly of the Province of Canada, including elected representatives from both Canada East and Canada West, made Victoria's birthday, 24 May, a public holiday called Victoria Day.

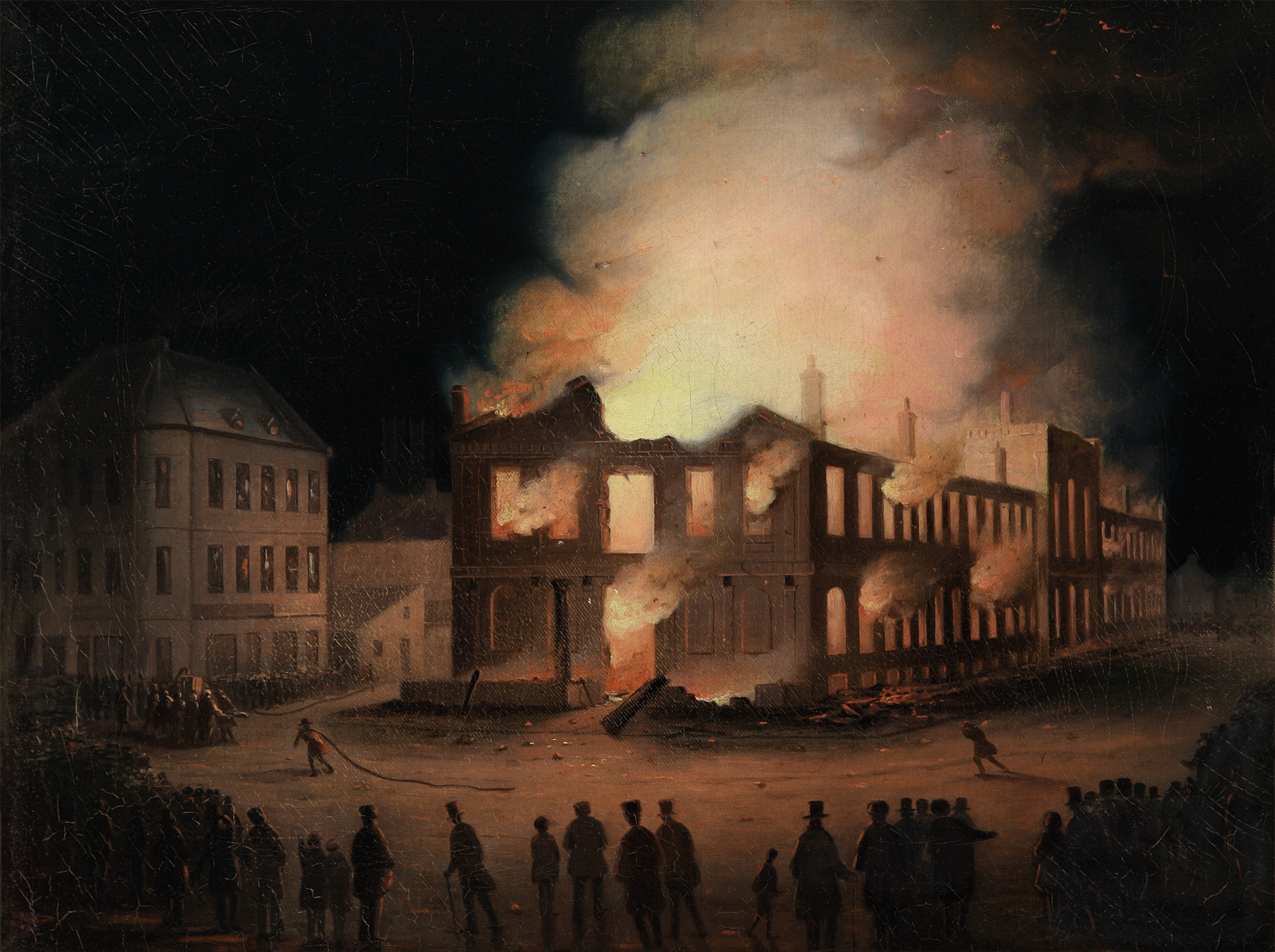
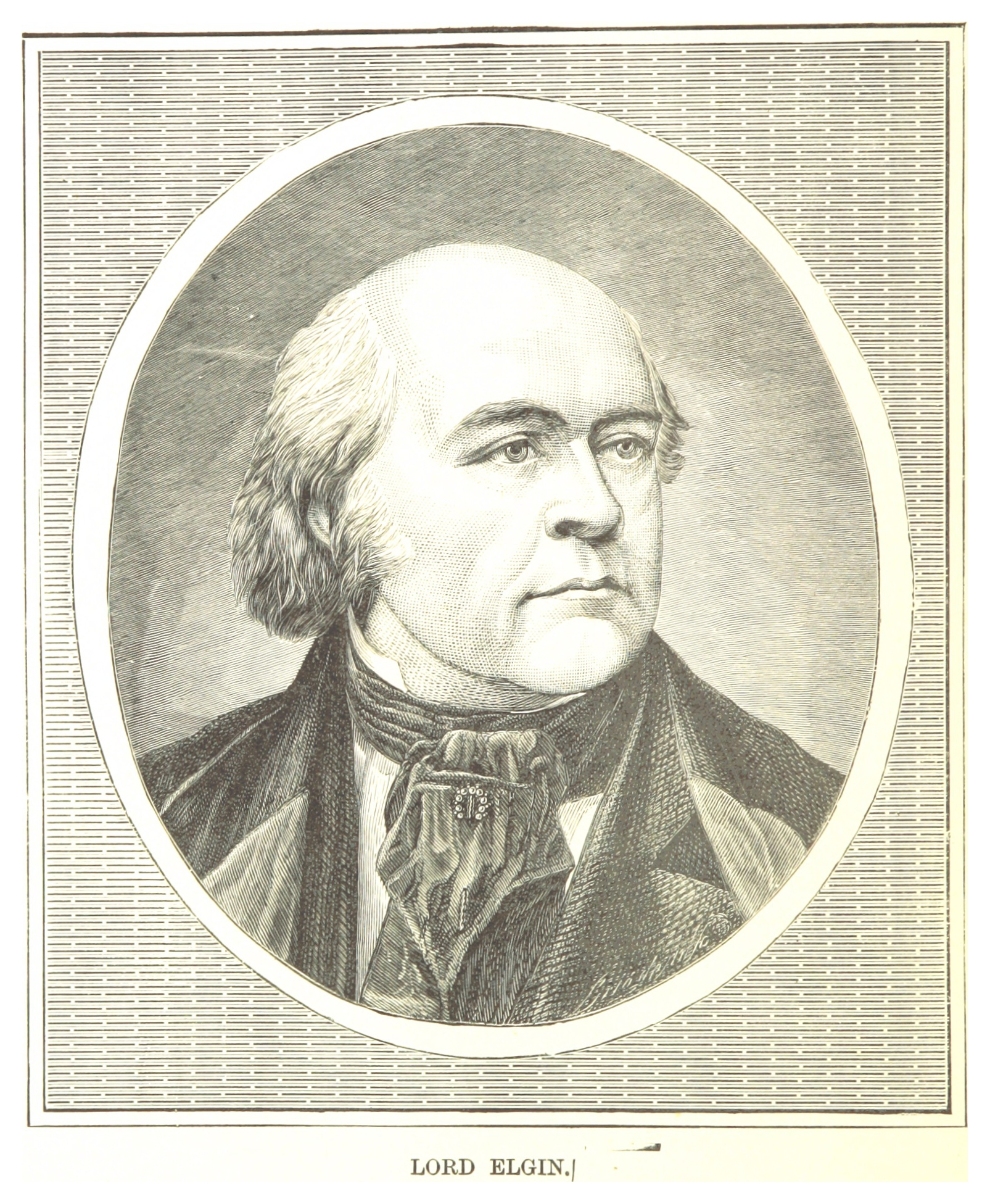
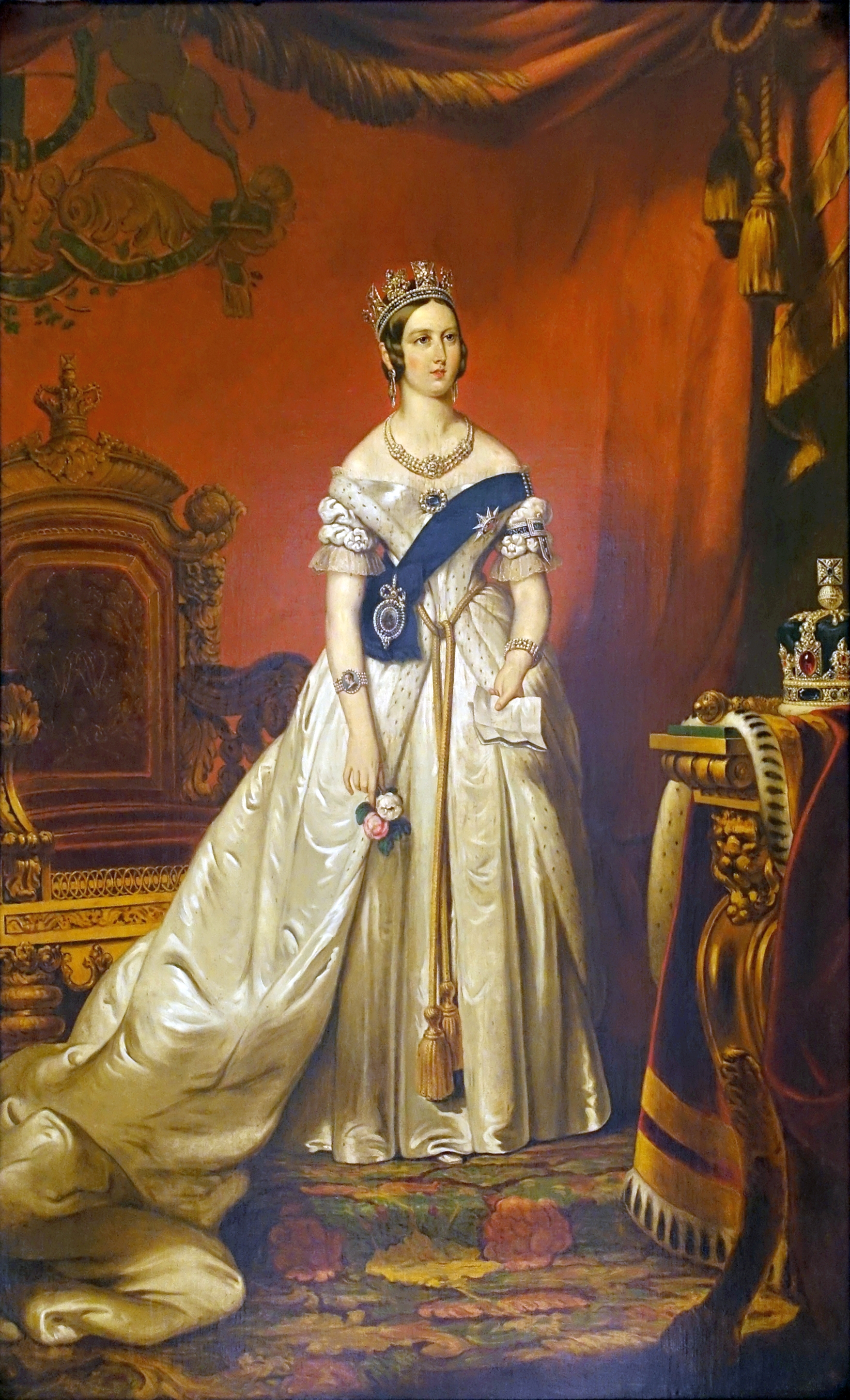
(Clockwise from top) The burning of the Legislative Assembly of the Province of Canada in Montreal, 28 April 1849; a copy of the portrait of Queen Victoria saved from the burning of the parliament; Governor General of the Province of Canada the Earl of Elgin

When, in 1848, Louis-Hippolyte Lafontaine and Robert Baldwin were reappointed as Joint Premiers, responsible government was implemented in the colony, with the backing of Queen Victoria. This meant the governor general was to act on the advice of his co-prime ministers, who were responsible to the elected parliament. The first test of this came in the same year, when the Rebellion Losses Act was put to Governor General the Earl of Elgin for royal assent. Elgin had strong misgivings about the bill, and was pressured by the Tories to refuse assent, but he gave it approval, regardless, on 28 April 1849. As a result, the Anglophone population of Montreal (where the legislature was located) became incensed, the Governor General was assaulted, the parliament building was burned, and the Montreal Annexation Manifesto was issued, calling for the absorbption of the Province of Canada into the United States. It was signed by, among others, Papineau.

Still, all was not lost: The portrait of Queen Victoria that hung in the parliament, painted by John Partridge, was saved from the fire by Sandford Fleming (and hangs in the federal Parliament of Canada today), the colony did not join the US, and responsible government remained a part of the Province of Canada's constitutional order.

=== Signs of loyalty ===
On 14 May 1859, the Legislative Assembly of the Province of Canada petitioned Queen Victoria and other members of the royal family to visit Montreal for the opening of the Victoria Bridge. Unwilling to leave London in the hands of rivaling politicians, the Queen instead sent her eldest son and heir, Prince Albert Edward (later King Edward VII) to tour the Maritimes and Province of Canada for four months in 1860. The Prince was formally welcomed into the Province of Canada by a Canadian delegation, who came aboard HMS Hero near Percé Rock; the group included Governor General Edmund Walker Head and Joint Premiers George-Étienne Cartier and John A. Macdonald. Arriving at Quebec City on 17 August, Albert Edward knighted Narcisse Belleau, Speaker of the Legislative Council, and Henry Smith, Speaker of the Legislative Assembly; visited Montmorency Falls; and made an address at the Université Laval.

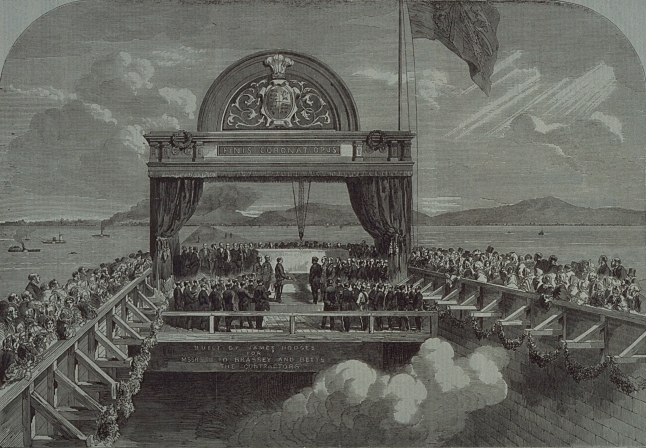
The Prince of Wales dedicating the Victoria Bridge in Montreal, 1860

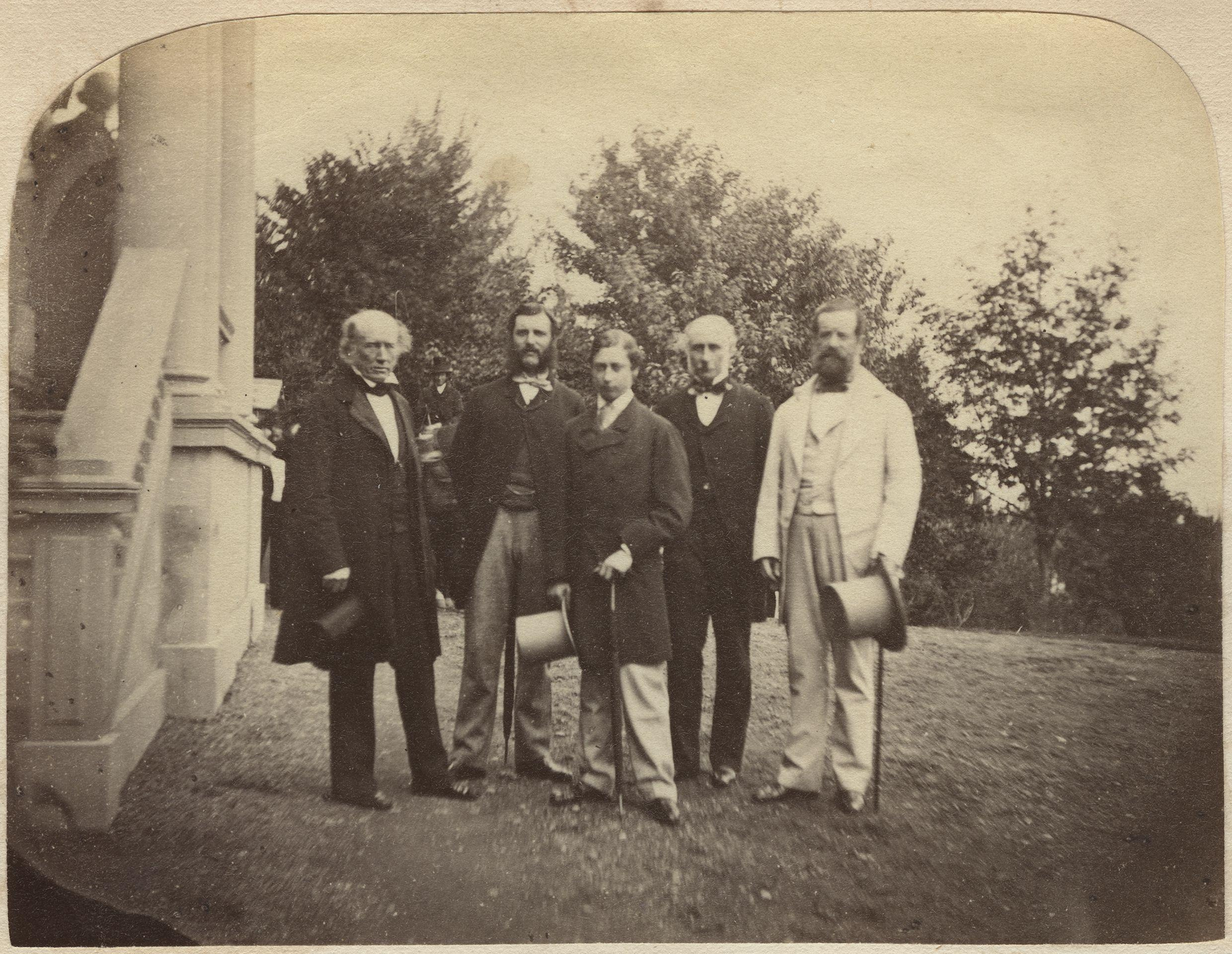
Edmund Walker Head, Christopher Teesdale, Prince Albert Edward, Robert Preston Bruce, and the Duke of Newcastle in Montreal, 1860

Several members of the Legislative Assembly joined the Prince near Trois-Rivières, as the royal party was making its way to Montreal. There, Albert Edward took a specially-built open railway car to the Victoria Bridge in Pointe-Saint-Charles and tapped in-place the structure's final stone. During his five-day visit to the city, he stayed at the viceregal residence, Spencerwood, and inaugurated the city's Crystal Palace, recalling, in an address to the crowd, the favourable impression made by Canadians at the Great Exhibition.

Albert Edward was followed by his younger brother, Prince Alfred, who embarked on a five-week tour of the same areas in 1861. The Montreal Gazette noted, "Prince Alfred drove quietly through the town, making purchases at several shops; and the people seeing him thus occupied with business, forebore to mob or interrupt him". From Canada, Alfred wrote a letter to his parents "in Native American style": on a piece of birch-bark he'd pulled from a tree that day.

=== Confederation ===
At the Charlottetown and Quebec Conferences in 1864, prominent French-Canadian politicians, particularly George-Étienne Cartier, supported confederating the Canadian colonies into a self-governing constitutional monarchy. This was achieved with the passage of the British North America Act (today the Constitution Act), 1867, uniting Nova Scotia, New Brunswick, Canada West, and Canada East into the Dominion of Canada, with Canada East becoming the province of Quebec.

Following the Red River Rebellion, between 1869 and 1870, in which Métis leader Louis Riel militantly resisted the annexation of the North-West Territories, where the Red River Colony was located, into Canada, Governor General the Earl of Dufferin heeded appeals from the francophones in Quebec who were sympathetic to the Métis and prevented the execution of Ambroise Lépine, who had executed Thomas Scott. Although Scott had been the son a tenant on Dufferin's estate in Northern Ireland, Dufferin reduced Lépine's sentence to two years in jail.

=== 20th century ===
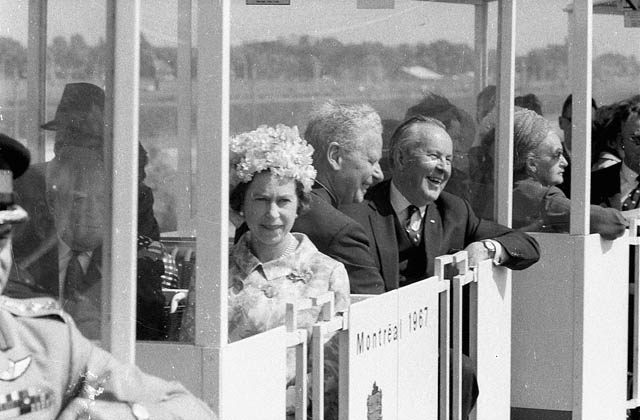
Queen Elizabeth II and her Prime Minister, Lester B. Pearson, at Expo 67 in Montreal, Quebec, 3 July 1967

Prince George, Prince of Wales (the future King George V), was present for the celebration of Quebec City's tercentenary in 1908, His son, Prince Albert (later King George VI), visited Quebec in 1913, while serving as a midshipman aboard the Royal Navy cruiser HMS Cumberland, spending some leisure time salmon fishing around Québec City.

Ernest Lapointe, then the Minister of Justice and Attorney General of Canada in the Cabinet headed by Prime Minister William Lyon Mackenzie King, chaired the Canadian delegation involved in deliberations leading to the Statute of Westminster, 1931; a law that had support from a wide swath of Quebec's political elite, as it gave Canada its own crown and, consequently, control over its own foreign affairs and a distinction apart from the British Empire.

== See also ==
- Oath of Allegiance
- Symbols of Quebec
- Monarchy
