= Édifice André-Laurendeau =

Office tower in Quebec, Canada

Coordinates: 46.8084°N 71.2155°W

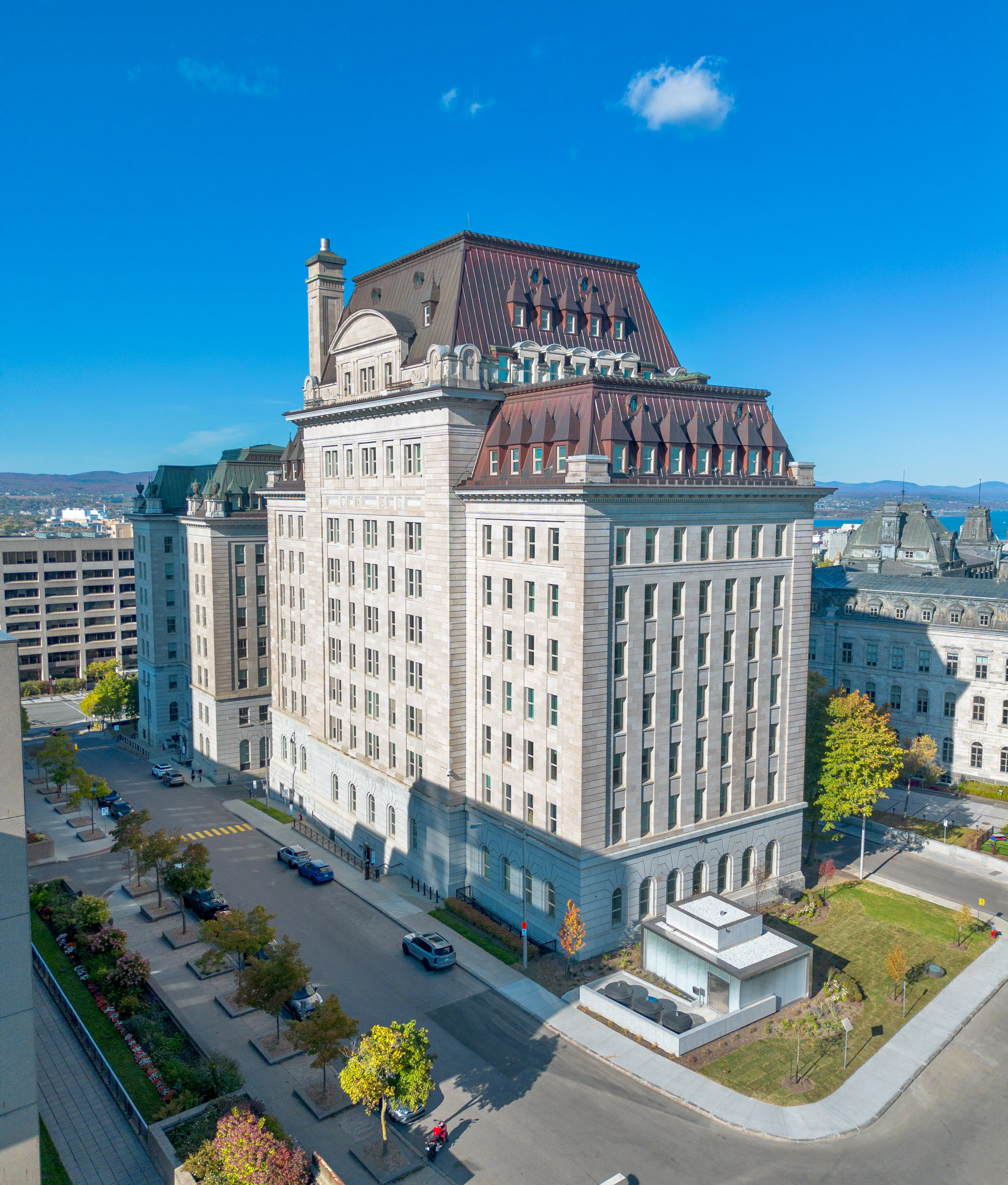
Édifice André-Laurendeau

Édifice André-Laurendeau (French pronunciation: [edifis ɑ̃dʁe lɔʁɑ̃do]) is an eleven-storey office tower located at 1050, rue des Parlementaires in Quebec City, Quebec. The Beaux-Arts structure was built between 1935 and 1937, designed by Lacroix, Drouin and Bergeron, and is the property of the Crown in Right of Quebec. In 1980, it was named in honour of journalist and politician André Laurendeau.

== Office of the Lieutenant Governor of Quebec ==
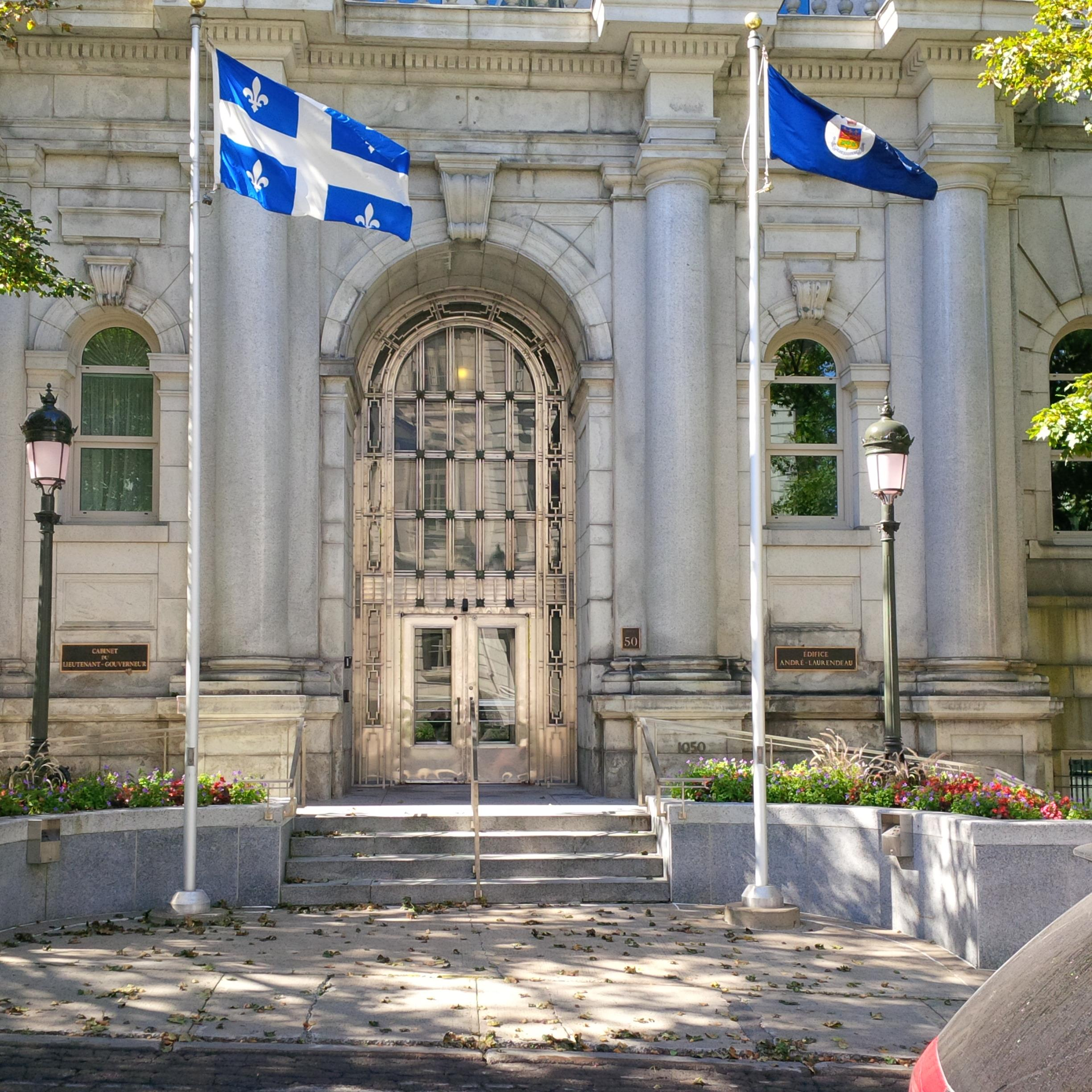
The entrance of the offices of the Lieutenant Governor of Quebec, at 1050 des Parlementaires, in Quebec City

After the fire at Bois de Coulonge in 1966, the office of the lieutenant governor of Quebec was moved to a suite of reception rooms, offices, and support facilities in the Édifice André-Laurendeau. The viceregal suite is the site of swearing-in ceremonies for Cabinet ministers and the granting of royal assent, and where the lieutenant governor receives his or her premier. Whenever the Canadian sovereign and/or other members of the royal family are in the provincial capital, he or she resides, or they reside, at a hotel.
