= Government House (Quebec) =

Official residence in Quebec from 1870 to 1966

Coordinates: 46°47′20″N 71°14′24″W

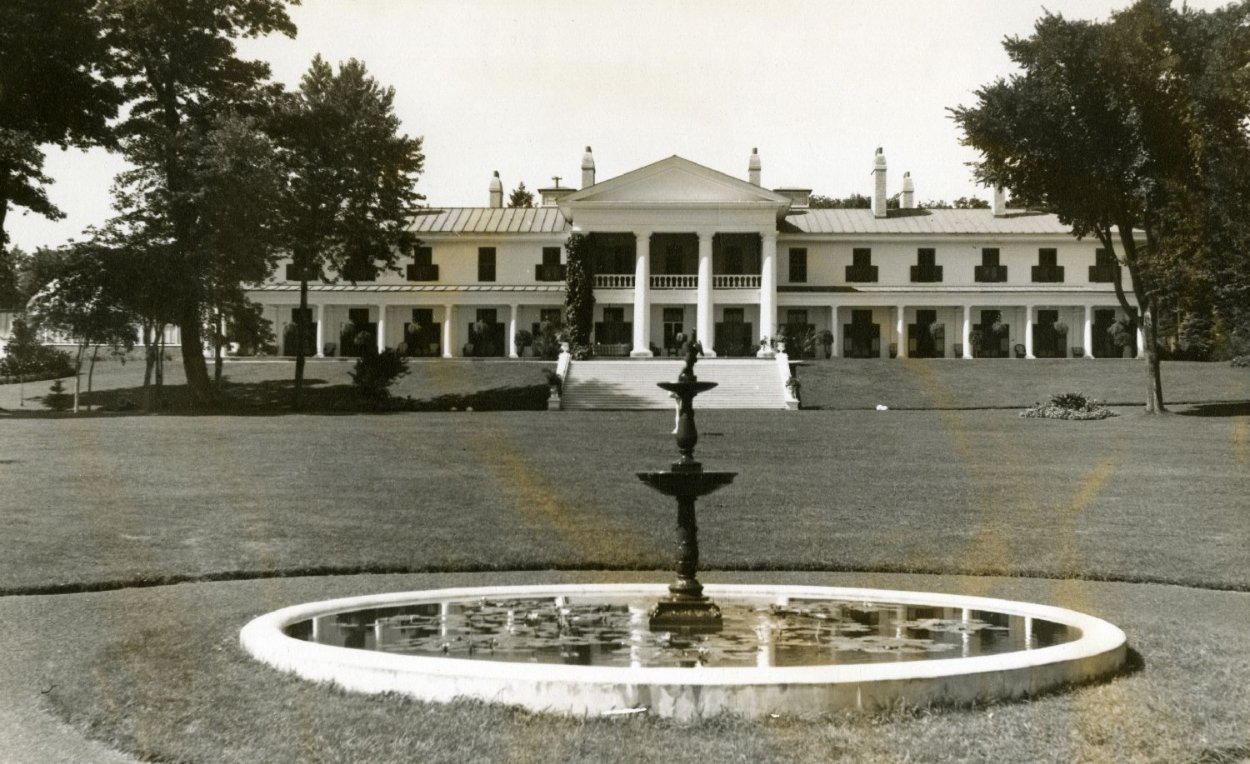
Spencer Wood, the former official residence of the Lieutenant Governor of Quebec, as seen in the 1920s or 1930s.

Quebec's Government House, known as Spencer Wood, was the viceregal residence of Quebec. It was built in 1854. Located at Bois-de-Coulonge Park (upstream of the Plains of Abraham and overlooking Anse-au-Foulon) in Sillery, it was purchased by the Quebec government in 1870, and served as the residence of Quebec lieutenant governors until 1966, when a major fire destroyed the main residence.

== History ==
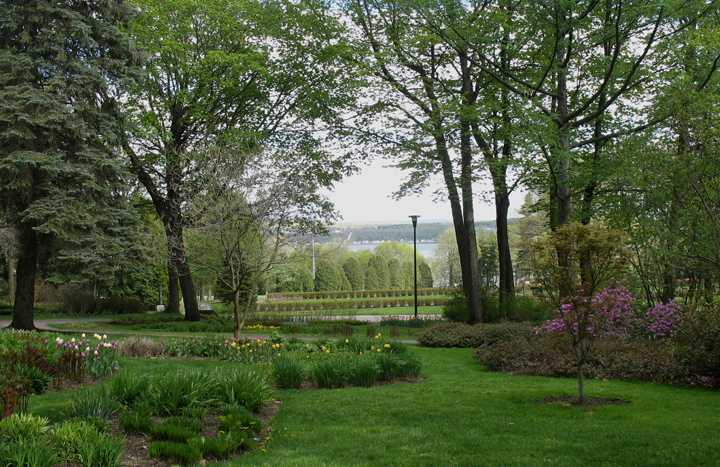
Bois-de-Coulonge Park

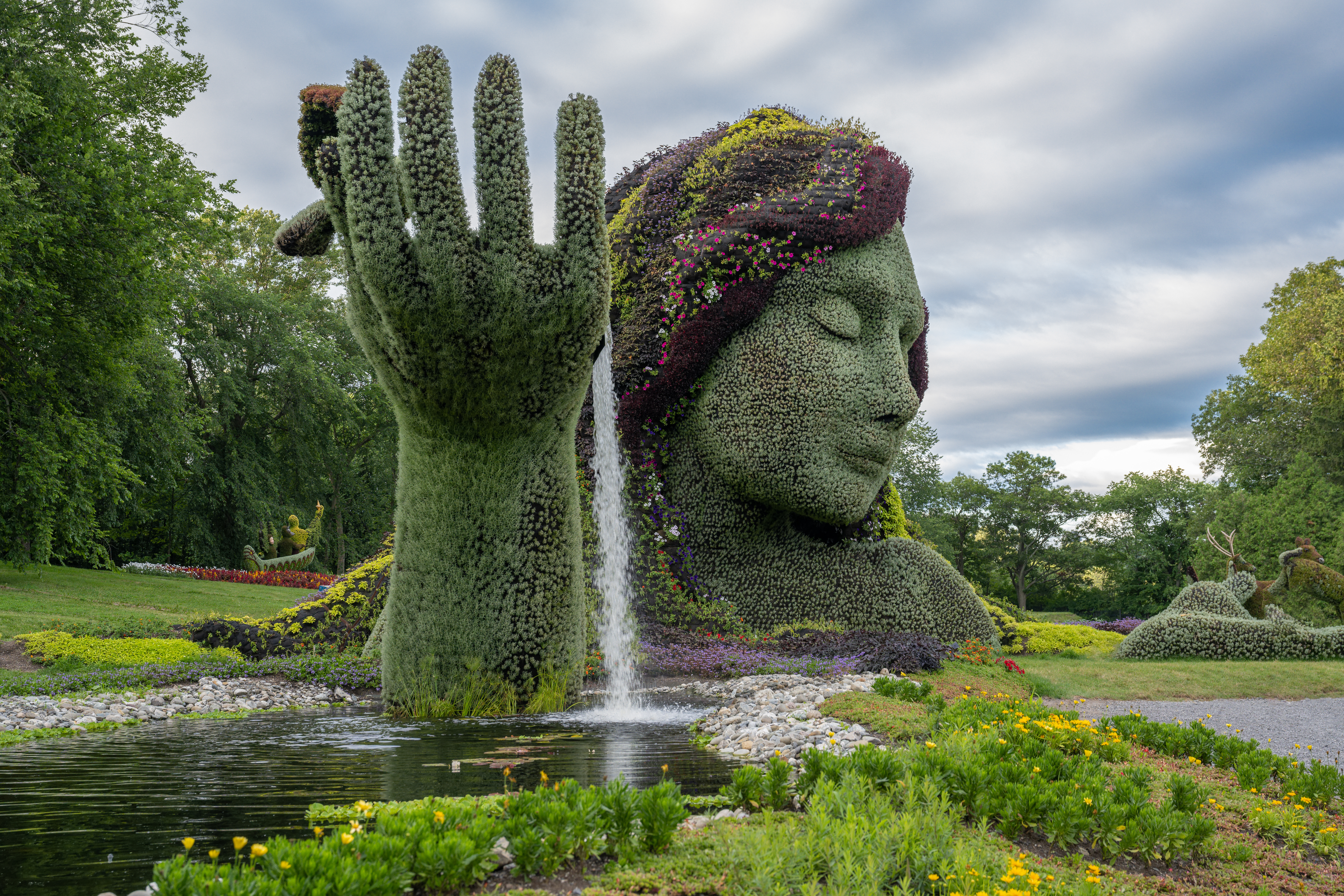
Botanical sculpture on the park grounds

Originally, the residence of the governor of New France was at the Château St-Louis, in the capital, Quebec City. The monarch's representative continues to work and reside in that city; however, like Ontario, Quebec no longer has an official Government House, after Spencer Wood burned down in 1966. Instead the governor holds an office and a suite of rooms for entertaining near the Parliament Building.

From 1867 to 1881 lieutenant governors of Quebec maintained a separate working office at the Maison Sewell, after which it was moved to the old parliament buildings. It remained there until 1979 when the office moved again to the Édifice André-Laurendeau, where all the fittings and furniture were brought to from the former location. Inside are reception rooms, offices and support facilities. The royal suite is the site of swearing-in ceremonies for Cabinet ministers, where royal assent is granted, and where the lieutenant governor receives the premier. Whenever the sovereign or other members of the Royal Family are in the provincial capital, the lieutenant governor resides at a hotel, usually the Château Frontenac.

The history of this park goes back at the very start of the French regime in 1633, when Louis d'Ailleboust de Coulonge, third governor of New France, occupied it. This estate and several other properties of the governor became one large estate (much larger than today's park) on 9 April 1657 and was named the châtellenie of Coulonge. It was after his death that the estate was sold to the sisters of the Augustine order the Hôtel-Dieu, and on 12 May 1676, the Quebec Seminary acquired the property.

After the British conquest, the seminary, not having enough funds, sold one of the lots in 1780 to an English officer, Henry Watson Powell, who named this area Powell Place. To create comfortable living quarters, he had a villa, greenhouses and trails built. The park again changed its name in 1811, when Michael Henry and Anne Mary Perceval became the owners and called it Spencer Wood. However, its splendour today is owed in part to Henry Atkinson, who bought this land in 1833. With his gardener, he created an English-style garden with elms, oaks and trails. Without an owner in 1854, the estate was divided into several sections and the most imposing lot was bought by the government of the Province of Canada to house the governor general.

Six years later, a fire completely destroyed the governor general's residence. The house was rebuilt in 1862, with a castle-like length of 56 metres (184 ft), a servant's wing, and a winter garden. In 1870, Spencer Wood was sold to the province of Quebec and was then home to the lieutenant governor. A few modifications were made throughout the years, namely the fountain that we see today. The Spencer Wood estate was renamed Bois-de-Coulonge in 1950. In total, 21 lieutenant governors succeeded each other at this estate and the last one, Paul Comtois, died in the fire which destroyed the house on 21 February 1966, while trying to save the Blessed Sacrament from the private chapel. It was in 1986, after the estate was abandoned, that restoration was undertaken. Finally, the National Capital Commission of Quebec became its owner in 1996.

== See also ==
- Government Houses of Canada
- Government Houses of the British Empire and Commonwealth
- Lieutenant Governor of Quebec
