= Flag of Carillon =

Battle Standard of General de Montcalm

Flag of Carillon (obverse and reverse)

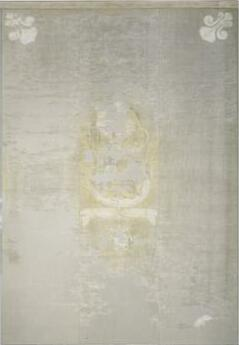
The original flag of Carillon, displayed at the Musée de l'Amérique française in Quebec City.

The flag of Carillon was flown by the troops of General Louis-Joseph de Montcalm during the Battle of Carillon, which was fought by the French and Canadian forces against those of the British in July 1758 at Fort Carillon.

In 2009, it was displayed at the Musée de l'Amérique française in Quebec City.

== Discovery ==
In March 1882, Ernest Gagnon wrote that Louis de Gonzague Baillargé (1808–1896), lawyer, businessman, and philanthropist in Quebec, "having read in an old chronicle that a flag from Carillon and suspended in the church of the Recollets in Quebec City had been saved during the fire of the church in 1796," began researching in order to find the flag. In November or December 1847, he met the last of the Récollet priests, Father Louis Marinet dit Bonami (1764–1848), in his residence on Saint-Vallier Street near the Quebec General Hospital.

Towards mid-1848, Baillargé returned to Bonami, who related the history of the flag of Carillon. Baillargé died April 7 of that year from a stroke which occurred in January.

Father Berey (1720–1800), superior of the Récollets, was chaplain to Montcalm's troops. When he returned to the monastery after the campaign of 1758, he brought back with him a flag which was torn and ripped. He mentioned at the convent that it had seen the battle of Carillon. This flag had been suspended from the vault of the Récollet church. On September 6, 1796, a fire which had burnt a house on Saint-Louis Street had also set fire to the convent and church of the Récollets. The conflagration having taken hold in the steeple of the church, the roof burnt before the rest of the church. While one of the brothers was saving a chest filled with objects thrown into it, he crossed the nave of the church, and the old flag fell in front of him. Father Louis took it with him and placed it in the chest with the other objects.

== Description ==
The banner dates back to the 18th century, confirmed by textile expert Jean-Michel Tuchscherer: "The flag is without doubt an exceptional piece from the 18th century" [Robitaille]. As for the coat of arms under the Madonna now missing, it was most probably that of Charles de la Boische, Marquis de Beauharnois (1671–1749), Governor of New France from 1726 to 1747: Argent, a fess and in chief three martlets sable. Only the governor had the right to inscribe his personal arms on a banner with the arms of France, and only Beauharnois had eagles as supporters. The flag was probably fabricated around 1726, date of the arrival of Beauharnois, and it was known to have been flown on May 29, 1732, for the Order of Saint Louis, with its motto bellicae virtutis praemium (Latin for 'reward of wartime valour').

In 2008, the Canadian Register of Arms, Flags and Badges confirmed the flag's appearance:

Obverse: Azure the Blessed Virgin Mary Argent vested Gules cloaked Azure crowned and enhaloed of mullets, holding the Christ child and standing on a crescent above a scroll Argent inscribed refugium peccatorum [Refuge of Sinners] in letters Sable ensigning the arms of Beauharnois (Argent a fess and in chief three martlets Sable) ensigned by a marquis’s coronet, suspended therefrom the insignia of the Ordre de Saint-Louis and supported by two eagles close, all between four fleurs-de-lis reversed, two in bend and two in bend sinister Argent;

Reverse: Azure the arms of France Modern (Azure three fleurs-de-lis Or) ensigned by the Royal Crown of France and environed by two palm branches Or bound by a ribbon Gules all between four fleurs-de-lis reversed, two in bend and two in bend sinister Argent;

== See also ==
- Coat of arms of Quebec
- Flag of Quebec
- List of Canadian provincial and territorial symbols
- Symbols of Quebec
- Timeline of Quebec history
