= Symbols of Quebec =

Symbols of Canadian province

The people and province of Quebec have created and established several symbols throughout Quebec's history to represent the collective identity of its residents. Many of Quebec's symbols are related to its history, to Catholicism, to Quebec's winters and/or the flora and fauna of Quebec. The motif most commonly seen in Quebec's various symbols is the fleur de lys, which is associated with the French language and New France.

== Symbols ==
The fleur-de-lis, one of Quebec's most common symbols, is an ancient symbol of the French monarchy and was first shown in Quebec on the shores of Gaspésie in 1534 when Jacques Cartier arrived in Quebec for the first time. Saint-Jean-Baptiste, the patron saint of Canadiens, is honoured every 24 June during Saint-Jean-Baptiste Day. The expression La belle province is still used as a nickname for the province. Finally, the Great Seal of Quebec is used to authenticate documents issued by the government of Quebec.

=== Coat of arms ===
The coat of arms of Quebec dates back to 1868, shortly after the creation of Quebec as a province of Canada. The arms were granted by a royal warrant issued by Queen Victoria.

The arms were adopted in their current form by the government of Quebec in 1939 to reflect Quebec's political history: the French regime is symbolised by the gold fleur-de-lis on a blue background; the British regime is symbolised by a gold lion on a red background; the pre-Confederation period is symbolised by three green maple leaves on a gold background. In 2026, the Government of Quebec amended the coat of arms by removing the Tudor Crown as a crest.

=== Flag ===
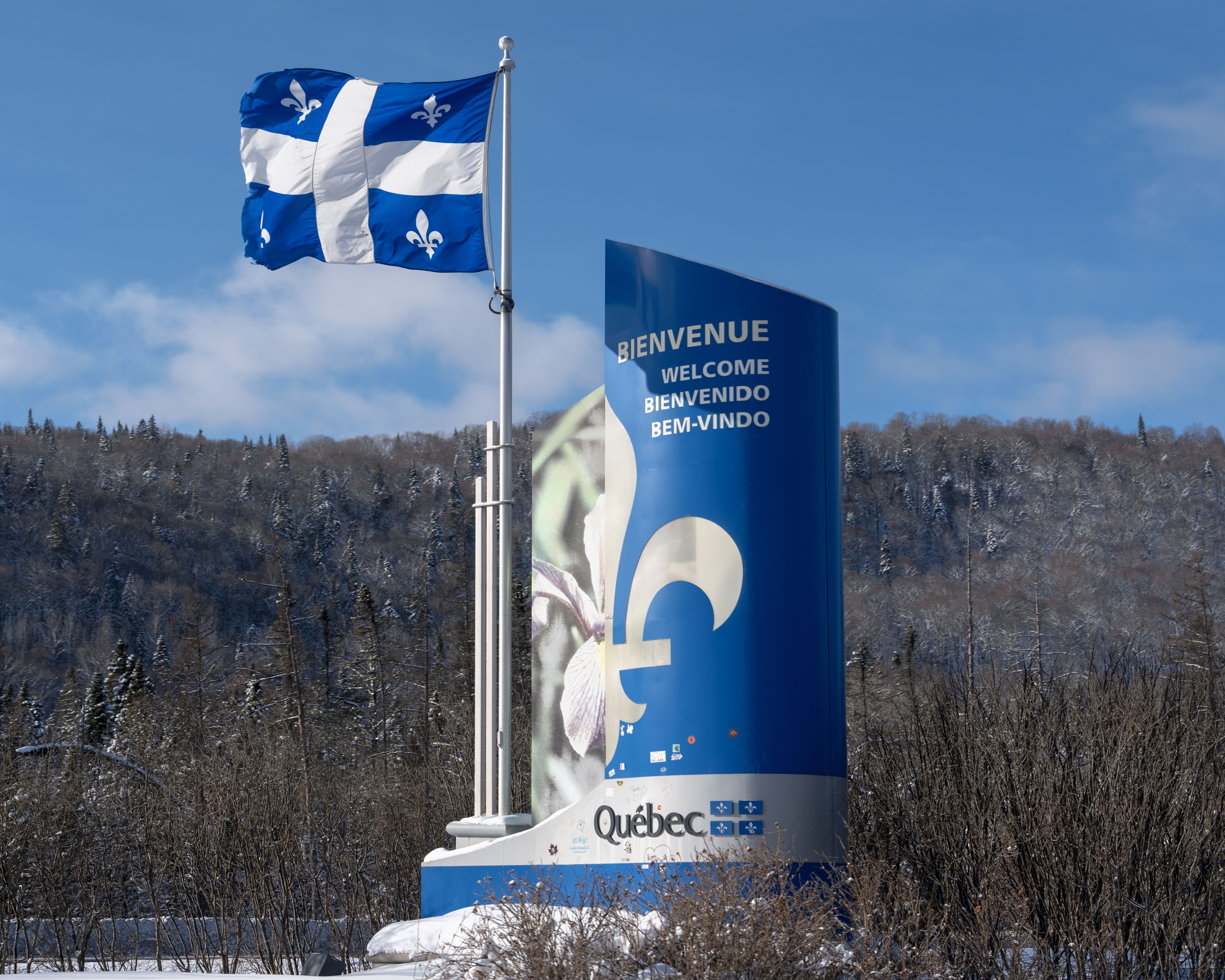
Fleurdelisé flying at the provincial border

The government of Quebec adopted the Fleurdelisé flag in 1948. The cross represents the faith of the province's founders, while the fleur-de-lys and blue colour recall Quebec's French origins.

When Samuel de Champlain founded Québec City in 1608, his ship hoisted the French merchant flag, which consisted of a white cross on a blue background. Later on, at the Battle of Carillon, in 1758, the Flag of Carillon was flown. This flag inspired the first members of the Saint-Jean-Baptiste Society to create the Carillon Sacré-Coeur flag, which consisted of a white cross on an azur background with white fleur-de-lis in each corner and a Sacred Heart surrounded by maple leaves in the centre. The Carillon Sacré-Coeur and French merchant flag went on to be the major inspirations for Québécois when creating Quebec's current flag in 1903, called the Fleurdelisé. The Fleurdelisé replaced the Union Jack on Quebec's Parliament Building on January 21, 1948, and it has flown there ever since.

=== Motto ===
The motto, Je me souviens ("I remember"), was devised by the architect of Quebec's Parliament Building, Eugène-Étienne Taché, in 1883. He carved it into the Parliament building in various locations. Je me souviens is an official part of the coat of arms and has been the official licence plate motto since 1978, replacing the previous one: La belle province ("the beautiful province").

=== Other symbols ===
Three new official symbols were adopted in the late 1900s:

- Blue flag iris, the floral emblem of Quebec since 1999. It was chosen because it blooms around the time of Quebec's Fête nationale.
- The snowy owl, the avian emblem of Quebec since 1987. It was selected by the Québécois government to symbolize Quebec's winters and northern climate.
- The yellow birch, the tree emblem of Quebec since 1993. It was picked to emphasize the importance Québécois give to the forests. The tree is admired for its diverse uses, its commercial value and its autumn colours.

== List ==
Here is a non-exhaustive list of Quebec's symbols:

	Symbol	Image	Adopted	Remarks
Coat of arms	Coat of arms of Quebec	Coat of Arms of Quebec	January 23, 2026	Originally Granted by a Royal Warrant of Queen Victoria on May 26, 1868; the coat of arms was revised by the Quebec government on December 9, 1939, and was revised again by the Quebec government with the removal of the Tudor crown on January 23, 2026
Motto	Je me souviens I remember	Coat of Arms of Quebec	December 9, 1939	Granted with other elements of the coat of arms
Shield of Arms	Shield of arms of Quebec	Coat of Arms of Quebec	1939	The shield was granted by the Royal Warrant by Queen Victoria
Flag	Flag of Quebec	Flag of Quebec	January 21, 1948	
Provincial Symbol	Fleur-de-lis	Fleur de lis	July 24, 1534	
Floral	Blue Flag; Iris versicolor	Blue Flag	1999	
Bird	Snowy owl Bubo scandiacus	Snowy owl	1987	
Tree	Yellow birch Betula alleghaniensis Britton	Yellow birch	1993	
