= La belle province =

La belle province may refer to:

- "La belle province" ("the beautiful province"), a nickname for Quebec, a French-speaking province in Eastern Canada
- La Belle Province (restaurant), a fast-food chain based in Quebec
- The motto on Vehicle registration plates of Quebec prior to 1978 (the current motto is Je me souviens ("I remember"))
