= Battle of Carillon =

1758 French and Indian War battle

- Part of the French and Indian War
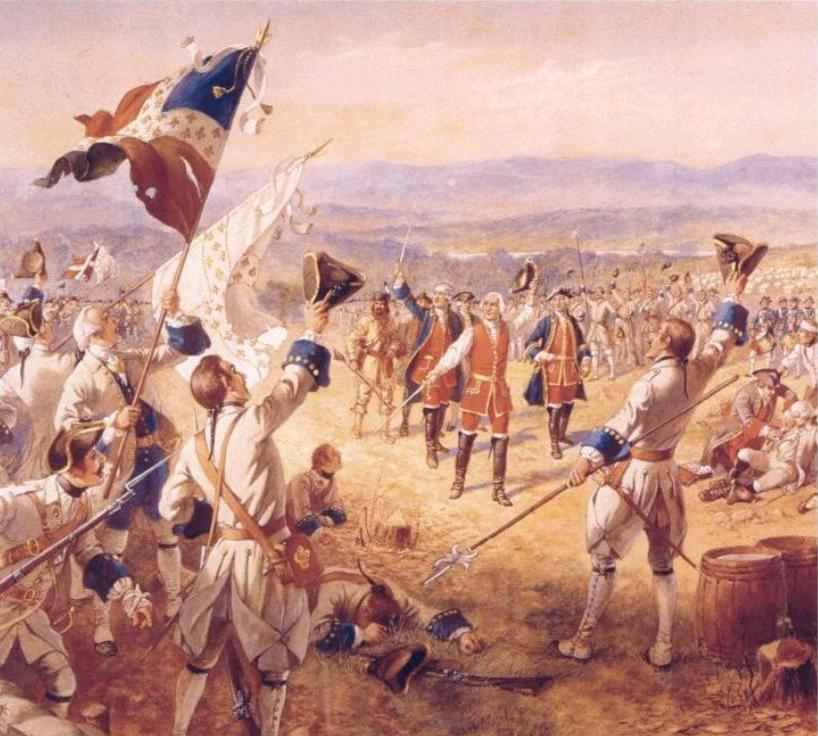
- The Victory of Montcalm's Troops at Carillon: Montcalm (centre) and his troops celebrate their victory.
Date	July 6–8, 1758
Location	near Fort Carillon, present-day Ticonderoga, New York, US 43°50′30″N 73°23′15″W
Result	French victory

Belligerents
France: (New France) Canada	Great Britain: America

Commanders and leaders
Louis-Joseph de Montcalm; Chevalier de Lévis; François-Charles de Bourlamaque	James Abercrombie; George Howe †

Strength
4,000 regulars, militia, and Indians; • 2,900 regulars; • 600 Indians; • 500 militia	6,000 regulars 12,000 provincial troops, rangers, and Indians

Casualties and losses
104 killed, 273 wounded (battle on July 8)	1,000 killed, 1,500 wounded (Note: In his official report, Abercrombie estimated the casualties at 547 killed, 1,356 wounded, and 77 missing (1,980 total). As per Lévis' report, 800 British bodies were subsequently recovered by the French; based on this, the possible British death toll is estimated at up to 1,000 and the wounded at up to 1,500.) (battle on July 8)

The Battle of Carillon, also known as the Battle of Ticonderoga, was fought on July 8, 1758, during the French and Indian War (which was part of the Seven Years' War). It was fought near Fort Carillon (now known as Fort Ticonderoga) on the shore of Lake Champlain in the frontier area between the British colony of New York and the French colony of New France.

In the battle, which took place primarily on a rise about three-quarters of a mile (one km) from the fort itself, a French army of about 4,000 men under General Marquis de Montcalm and the Chevalier de Lévis defeated a numerically superior force of British troops under General James Abercrombie, which frontally assaulted an entrenched French position without using field artillery, a lack that left the British and their allies vulnerable and allowed the French to win a complete victory. The battle was the bloodiest of the American theater of the war, with over 3,000 casualties suffered. French losses were about 400, while more than 2,000 were British.

American historian Lawrence Henry Gipson wrote of Abercrombie's campaign that "no military campaign was ever launched on American soil that involved a greater number of errors of judgment on the part of those in positions of responsibility". Many military historians have cited the Battle of Carillon as a classic example of tactical military incompetence. Abercrombie, confident of a quick victory, ignored several viable military options, such as flanking the French breastworks, waiting for his artillery, or laying siege to the fort. Instead, relying on a flawed report from a young military engineer, and ignoring some of that engineer's recommendations, he decided in favor of a direct frontal assault on the thoroughly entrenched French. Montcalm, while concerned about the weak military position of the fort, conducted the defense with spirit. However, due in part to a lack of time, he committed strategic errors in preparing the area's defenses that a competent attacker could have exploited, and he made tactical errors that made the attackers' job easier.

The fort, abandoned by its garrison, was captured by the British the following year, and it has been known as Fort Ticonderoga (after its location) ever since. This battle gave the fort a reputation for impregnability that had an effect on future military operations in the area. There were several large-scale military movements through the area in both the French and Indian War, as well as the American Revolutionary War with the American Capture of Fort Ticonderoga and the British siege of the fort two years later, however this was the only major battle fought near the fort's location.

== Geography ==
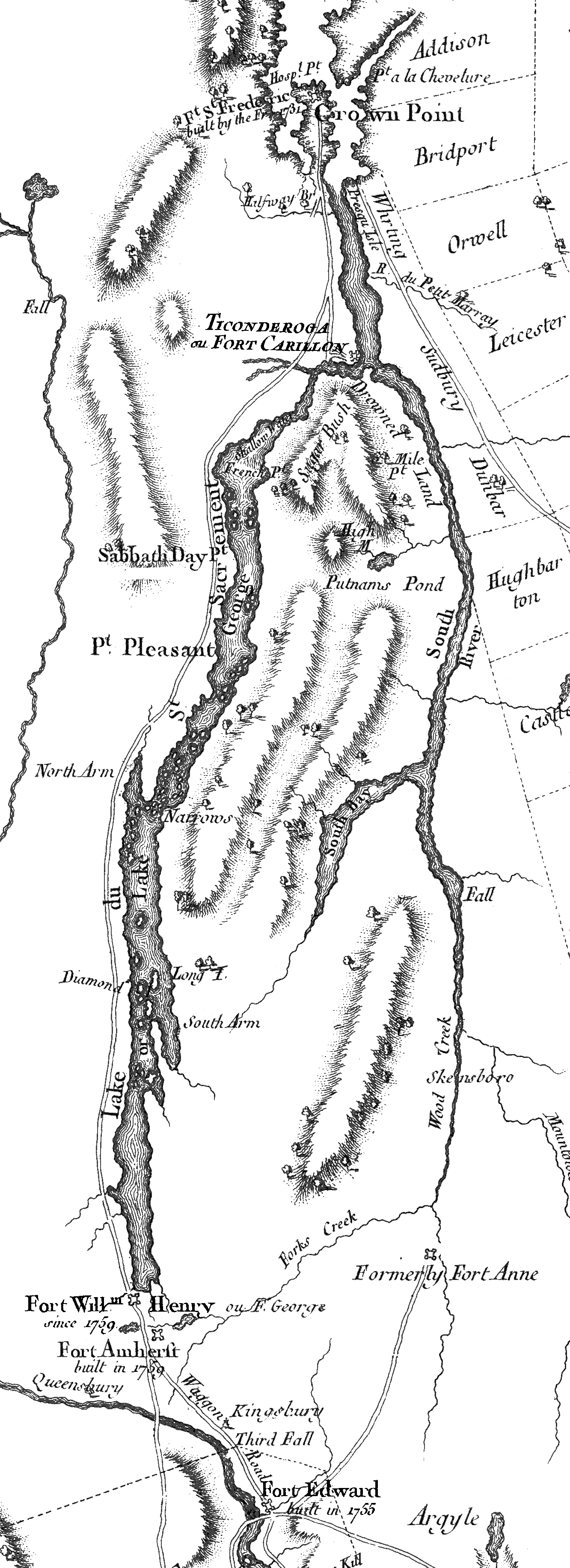
Detail of a 1777 map showing the area between Crown Point and Fort Edward. Mount Defiance is labeled "Sugar Bush".

Fort Carillon is situated on a point of land between Lake Champlain and Lake George, at a natural point of conflict between French forces moving south from Canada and the St. Lawrence River Valley across the lake toward the Hudson Valley, and British forces moving up the Hudson from Albany. The fort was sited with Lake Champlain to the east, with Mount Independence rising on the far side. Immediately to the south of the fort lay the mouth of the La Chute River, which drains Lake George. The river was largely non-navigable, and there was a portage trail from the northern end of Lake George to the location of a sawmill the French had built to assist in the fort's construction. The trail crossed the La Chute twice; once about 2 miles (3 km) from Lake George, and again at the sawmill, which was about 2 miles (3 km) from the fort.

To the north of the fort was a road going to Fort St. Frédéric. To the west was a low rise of land, beyond which lay Mount Hope, a rise that commanded part of the portage trail, but was too far from the fort to pose it any danger. The most serious geographic defect in the fort's location was Mount Defiance (known at the time of this battle as Rattlesnake Hill, and in the 1770s as Sugar Bush), which lay to the south of the fort, across the La Chute River. This 900 foot (270 m) hill, which was steep and densely forested, provided an excellent firing position for cannon aimed at the fort. Nicolas Sarrebource de Pontleroy, Montcalm's chief engineer, said of the fort's site, "Were I to be entrusted with the siege of it, I should require only six mortars and two cannon."

== Background ==
Prior to 1758, the French and Indian War had gone very poorly for the British, whose military met few of its objectives. Following a string of French victories in 1757 in North America, coupled with military setbacks in Europe, William Pitt gained full control of the direction of British military efforts in the Seven Years' War. Embarking on a strategy that emphasized defense in Europe, where France was strong, and offense in North America, where France was weak, he resolved to attack New France (the colonial holdings of France in North America) in three strategic campaigns. Large-scale campaigns were planned to capture Fort Duquesne on the Pennsylvania frontier and the fortress at Louisbourg (on Île-Royale, now known as Cape Breton Island). The third campaign, assigned to General James Abercrombie, was to launch an attack against Canada through the Champlain Valley. Pitt probably would have preferred to have George Howe, a skilled tactician and a dynamic leader, lead this expedition, but seniority and political considerations led him to appoint the relatively undistinguished Abercrombie instead. Howe was appointed a brigadier general, and placed as Abercrombie's second in command.

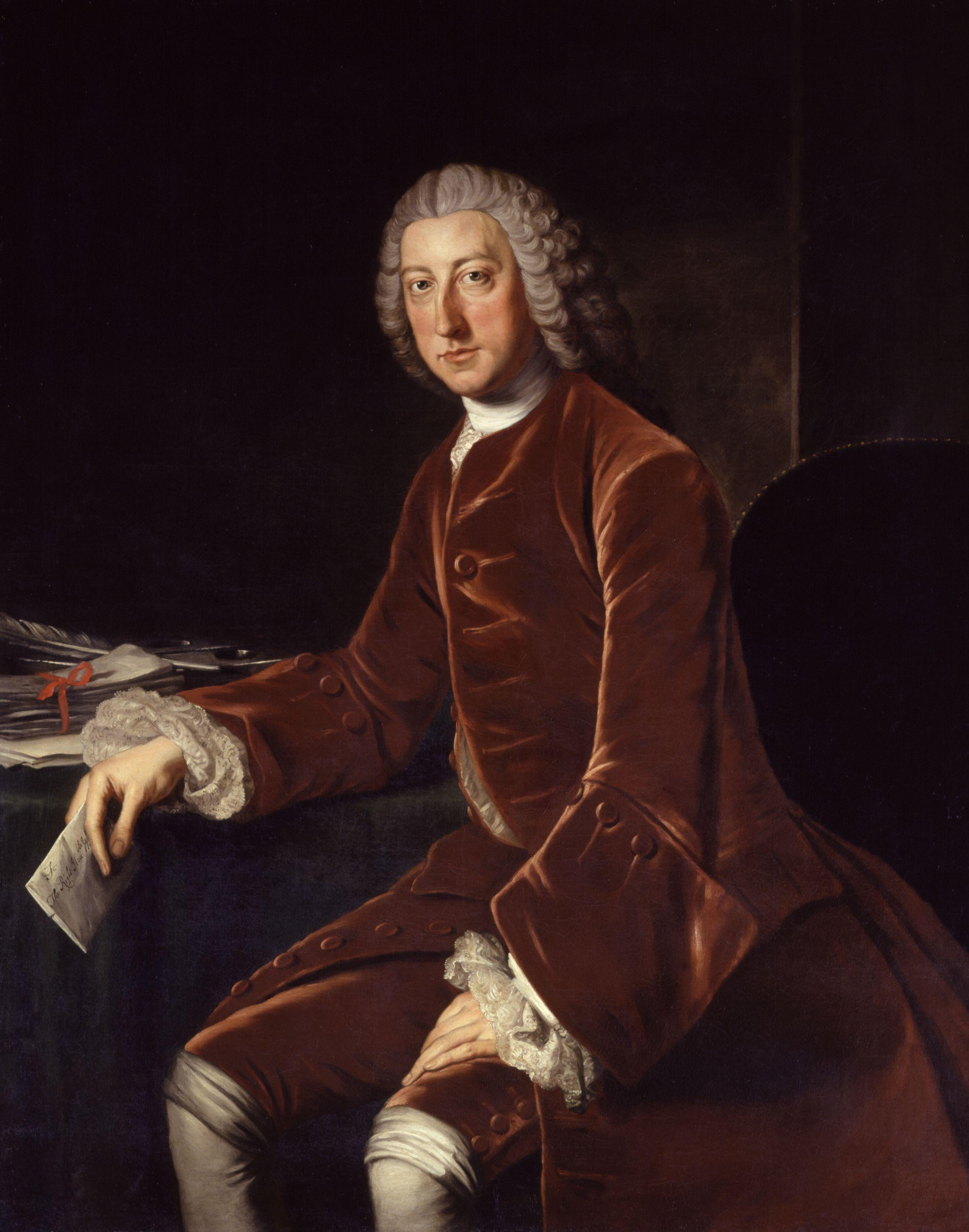
William Pitt directed the British war effort

The French, who had started construction on Fort Carillon in 1755, used it as a launching point for the successful siege of Fort William Henry in 1757. Despite that and other successes in North America in 1757, the situation did not look good for them in 1758. As early as March, Louis-Joseph de Montcalm, the commanding general responsible of the French forces in North America, and the Marquis de Vaudreuil, New France's governor, were aware that the British were planning to send large numbers of troops against them, and that they would have relatively little support from King Louis XV. The lack of support from France was in large part due to an unwillingness of the French military to risk the movement of significant military forces across the Atlantic Ocean, which was dominated by Britain's Royal Navy. This situation was further exacerbated by Canada's poor harvest in 1757, which resulted in food shortages as the winter progressed.

Montcalm and Vaudreuil, who did not get along with each other, differed on how to deal with the British threat. They had fewer than 5,000 regular troops, an estimated six thousand militia men, and a limited number of Indian allies, to bring against British forces reported to number 50,000. Vaudreuil, who had limited combat experience, wanted to divide the French forces, with about 5,000 each at Carillon and Louisbourg, and then send a picked force of about 3,500 men against the British in the Mohawk River on the northwestern frontiers of the Province of New York. Montcalm believed this to be folly, as the plan would enable the British to easily divert some of their forces to fend off the French attack. Vaudreuil prevailed, and in June 1758 Montcalm left Quebec for Carillon.

=== British preparations ===
The British amassed their army, under the command of General James Abercrombie, near the remains of Fort William Henry, which lay at the southern end of Lake George but had been destroyed following its capture by the French the previous year. The army numbered fully 16,000 men, making it the largest single force ever deployed in North America at the time. Its complement of 6,000 regular troops included Lord John Murray's Highlanders of the 42nd (Highland) Regiment of Foot, the 27th (Inniskilling) Regiment of Foot, the 44th Regiment of Foot, 46th Regiment of Foot, the 55th Regiment of Foot, the 1st and 4th battalions of 60th (Royal American) Regiment, and Gage's Light Infantry, while the provinces providing militia support included Connecticut, Massachusetts, New York, New Jersey, and Rhode Island. On July 5, 1758, these troops embarked on boats, which unloaded them at the north end of Lake George on July 6.

=== French defensive preparations ===
Colonel François-Charles de Bourlamaque, in command of Fort Carillon prior to Montcalm's arrival, knew by June 23 that a major British offensive was about to begin. He had sent a messenger bearing a letter from Vaudreuil to Abercrombie (part of a conventional exchange of pleasantries between opposing commanders) on June 10, expecting him to return; the fact that the British held him was an indication that the messenger had probably learned too much just by being in the British camp. Bourlamaque increased scouting activities, and learned from captured British scouts the approximate size of the British force.

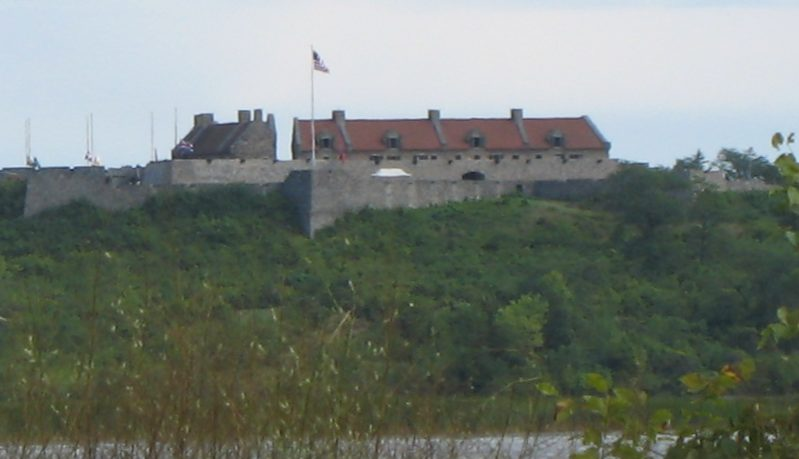
Fort Ticonderoga, as seen from Lake Champlain

Montcalm arrived at Fort Carillon on June 30, and found there a significantly under-staffed garrison, with only 3,500 men, and food sufficient for only nine days. Bourlamaque's scouts reported that the British had 20,000 or more troops massing near the remains of Fort William Henry. Given the large force facing him and the defects of the fort's site, Montcalm opted for a strategy of defending the likely approaches to the fort. He immediately detached Bourlamaque and three battalions to occupy and fortify the river crossing on the portage trail about two miles (3.2 km) from the northern end of Lake George, about 6 miles (9.7 km) from the fort. Montcalm himself took two battalions and occupied and fortified an advance camp at the sawmill, while remaining troops were put to work preparing additional defenses outside the fort. He also sent word back to Montreal of the situation, requesting that, if possible, the Chevalier de Lévis and his men, be sent as reinforcement; these were troops that Vaudreuil intended for duty at the western frontier forts. Lévis had not yet left Montreal, so Vaudreuil instead ordered him and 400 troops to Carillon. They departed Montreal on July 2.

When word reached Bourlamaque on July 5 that the British fleet was coming, he sent Captain Trépezet and about 350 men to observe the fleet, and, if possible, to prevent their landing. On learning the size of the British fleet, which was reportedly "large enough to cover the face of [Lake George]", Montcalm ordered Bourlamaque to retreat. Bourlamaque, who was satisfied with his defensive situation, resisted, not withdrawing until Montcalm repeated the orders three times. Montcalm, now aware of the scope of the movement, ordered all of the troops back to Carillon, and had both bridges on the portage trail destroyed. These withdrawals isolated Trépezet and his men from the main body, a situation made worse for Trépezet when his Indian guides, alarmed by the size of the British fleet, abandoned him.

Beginning on the evening of July 6, the French began to lay out entrenchments on the rise northwest of the fort, about 0.75 miles (1.21 km) away, that commanded the land routes to the fort. On July 7, they constructed a lengthy series of abatis (felled trees with sharpened branches pointed outward) below these entrenchments. By the end of that day, they had also constructed a wooden breastwork above the trenches. These hastily erected defenses, while proof against small arms fire, would have been ineffective if the British had used cannons against them.

== Battle of Bernetz Brook ==
Battle of Berntez Brook
- Part of the French and Indian War
Date	July 6, 1758
Location	near present-day Ticonderoga, New York, US
Result	British victory

Belligerents
France: (New France) Colony of Canada	Great Britain: British America

Commanders and leaders
Captain Trepezec †	George Howe †

Strength
350 regulars and Indians	500 regulars and militia

Casualties and losses
150 killed or wounded 150 captured	16–100 casualties

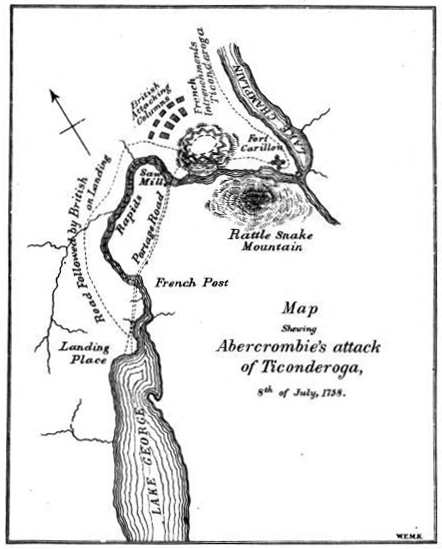
Map showing the intended route the British troops took toward the fort in their first attempt

The British army began an unopposed landing at the north end of Lake George on the morning of July 6. Abercrombie first landed an advance force to check the area where the forces were to disembark, and found it recently deserted; some supplies and equipment had been left behind by the French in their hasty departure. The bulk of the army landed, formed into columns, and attempted to march up the west side of the stream that connected Lake George to Lake Champlain, rather than along the portage trail, whose bridges Montcalm had destroyed. However, the wood was very thick, and the columns could not be maintained.

Near the area where Bernetz Brook enters the La Chute, Captain Trépezet and his troop, who were attempting to return to the French lines, encountered Phineas Lyman's Connecticut regiment, sparking a skirmish in the woods. General Howe's column was near the action, so he led it in that direction. As they approached the battle scene, General Howe was hit and instantly killed by a musket ball. A column of Massachusetts provincials, also drawn to the battle, cut off the French patrol's rear. In desperate fighting, about 150 of Trepézet's men were killed, and another 150 were captured. Fifty men, including Trepézet, escaped by swimming across the La Chute. Trepézet died the next day of wounds suffered in the battle.

Sources disagree on the number of casualties suffered. William Nester claims British casualties were light, only ten dead and six wounded, while Rene Chartrand claims that there were about 100 killed and wounded, including the loss of General Howe. The British, frustrated by the difficult woods, demoralized by Howe's death, and exhausted from the overnight boat ride, camped in the woods, and returned to the landing point early the next morning.

== Battle of Carillon ==
=== Reconnaissance ===
On July 7 Abercrombie sent Lieutenant Colonel John Bradstreet and a sizable force down the portage path. On reaching the first crossing, where Bourlamaque had camped, they rebuilt the bridge there, and proceeded on to the sawmill crossing. The army then followed, and set up its camp there. Scouts and prisoners reported to Abercrombie that Montcalm had 6,000 men and was expecting the Chevalier de Lévis to arrive at any moment with 3,000 reinforcements. Abercrombie ordered his engineer, Lieutenant Matthew Clerk, and one of his aides, Captain James Abercrombie (it is uncertain if the Abercrombies were related or not) to reconnoiter the French defenses. After ascending Rattlesnake Hill (as Mount Defiance was then known), they reported that the French position appeared to be incomplete, and could be "easily forced, even without cannon". They were unaware that the French had disguised much of the works with shrubs and trees, and that they were in fact largely complete. Clerk's report included recommendations to fortify both the summit and the base of Rattlesnake Hill. Abercrombie decided that they had to attack the next morning, hopefully before Lévis and his supposed 3,000 arrived. Lévis arrived at the fort on the evening of July 7 with his troop of 400 regulars.

Abercrombie held a war council that evening. The options he presented to his staff were limited to asking if the next day's attack should be in three ranks or four; the council opted for three. Abercrombie's plan of attack omitted Clerk's recommendation to fortify the summit of Rattlesnake Hill; in addition to the frontal assault, 4 six-pound guns and a howitzer were to be floated down the La Chute River and mounted at the base of Rattlesnake Hill, with 20 bateaux of troops to support the effort.

Early on the morning of July 8, Clerk went out once again to the base of Rattlesnake Hill to observe the French defenses; his report indicated that he still felt the French lines could be taken by assault.

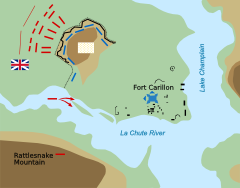
Schematic map depicting the battle lines (click for zoomable image)

=== Assault ===
The battle began on the morning of July 8 with Rogers' Rangers and light infantry from Colonel Thomas Gage's 80th Regiment of Light-Armed Foot pushing the few remaining French scouts behind the entrenchments. They were followed by provincials from New York and Massachusetts, and then three columns of regulars, who made their way through the provincial formations to begin the attack. The 27th and 60th made up the right column, under the command of the 27th's Lt. Col. William Haviland, the 44th and 55th under Lt. Col. John Donaldson made the center, and the 42nd and 46th under the 42nd's Lt. Col. Francis Grant formed the left column. Each column was preceded by the regimental light infantry companies. Held in reserve were provincial regiments from Connecticut and New Jersey.

Montcalm had organized the French forces into three brigades and a reserve. He commanded the Royal Roussillon and Berry battalions in the center of the entrenchments, while Lévis commanded the Béarn, Guyenne, and la Reine battalions on the right, and Bourlamaque led the La Sarre and Languedoc battalions on the left. Each battalion was given roughly 100 yards (91 m) of the entrenchment to defend. Redoubts with cannon protected the flanks of the entrenchments, although the one on the right had not been completed. The low ground between the left flank and the La Chute River was guarded by militia and marines, who had also constructed abatis to help protect their position. Reserve forces were either in the fort itself, or on the grounds between the fort and the entrenchments on Mount Hope. Portions of each battalion were also held in reserve, to assist in areas where they might be needed.

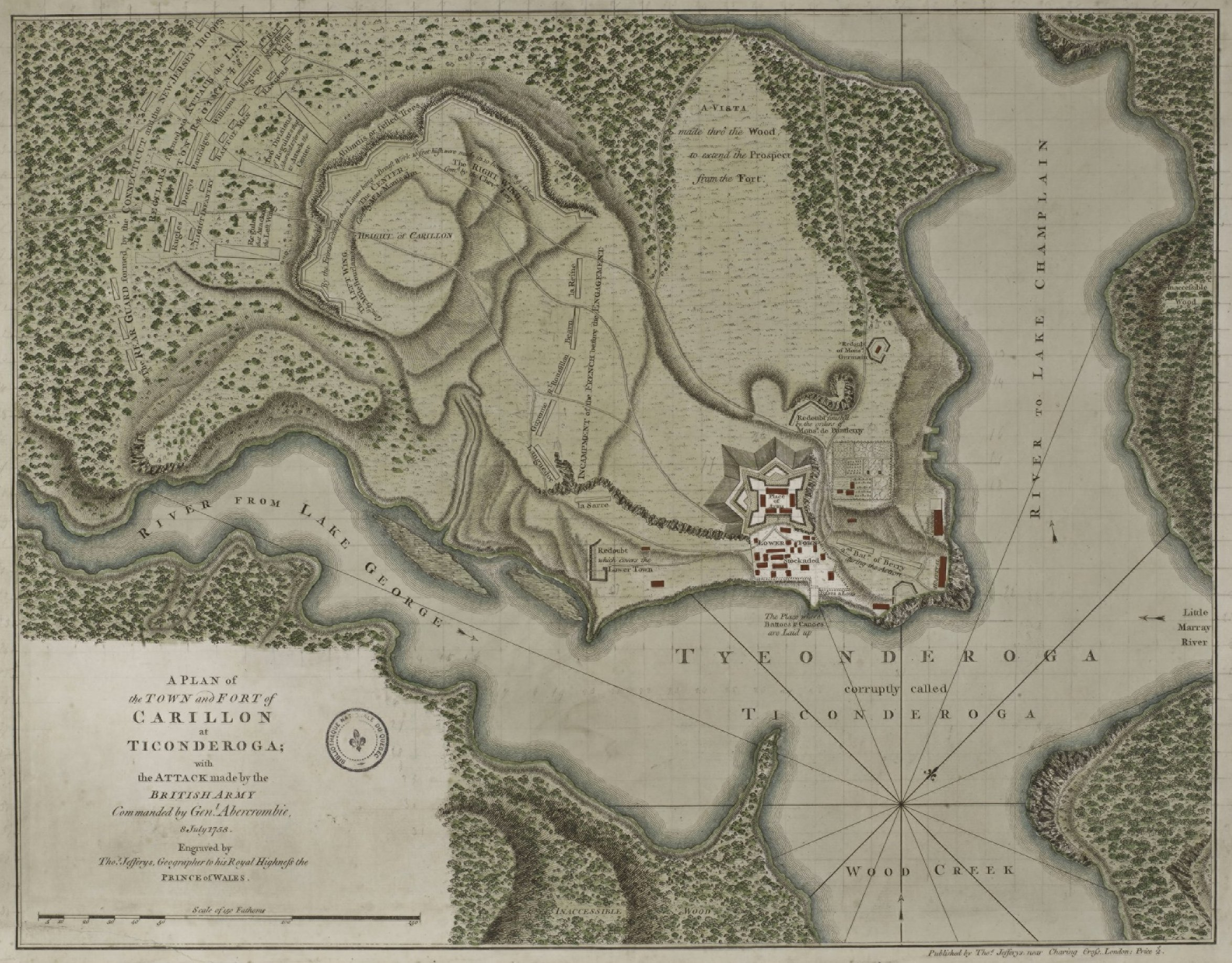
A 1758 map depicting the battle lines

While Abercrombie had expected the battle to begin at 1 pm, by 12:30 elements of the New York regiments on the left began engaging the French defenders. The sounds of battle led Haviland to believe that the French line might have been penetrated, so he ordered his men forward, even though not all of the regulars were in place, and Abercrombie had not given an order to advance. The result, rather than an orderly, coordinated advance on the French position, was a piecemeal entry of the regulars into the battle. As companies of the regulars came forward, they arranged themselves into lines as instructed, and then began to advance. The right column, with a shorter distance to travel, attacked first, followed by the center, and then the left. The 42nd had initially been held in reserve, but after insisting on being allowed to participate, they joined the action.

The French position was such that they were able to lay down withering fire on the British forces as they advanced, and the abatis (a word that shares derivation with abattoir, or slaughterhouse) rapidly became a killing field. By about 2 pm, it was clear that the first wave of attack had failed. Montcalm was active on the battlefield, having removed his coat, and was moving among his men, giving encouragement and making sure all of their needs were being met. Abercrombie, who was reported by early historians like Francis Parkman and Thomas Mante to be at the sawmill (and thus well away from the action), was reported by his aide, James Abercrombie, to be near the rear of the lines by the La Chute River during much of the battle, and to have approached the front of the French lines at one point early in the battle. It is uncertain why, after the first wave of attack failed, Abercrombie persisted in ordering further attacks. Writing in his own defense, he later claimed that he was relying on Clerk's assessment that the works could be easily taken; this was clearly refuted by the failure of the first charge.

Around 2 p.m., the British barges carrying artillery floated down the La Chute River, and, contrary to plan, came down a channel between an island in the La Chute and the shore. This brought them within range of the French left and some of the fort's guns. Fire from cannons on the fort's southwest bastion's sank two of the barges, spurring the remaining vessels to retreat.

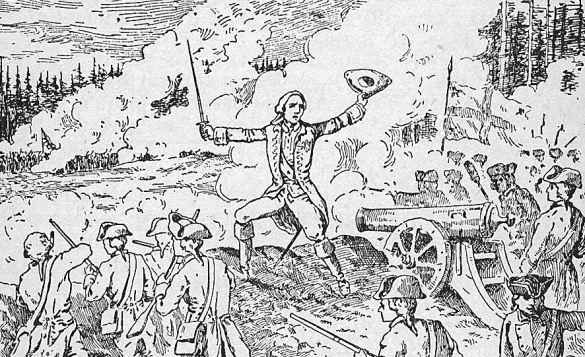
An early 20th-century illustration from a Quebec school text depicting Montcalm inspiring the defenders of Fort Carillon.

Abercrombie ordered his reserves, the Connecticut and New Jersey provincials, into the battle around 2, but by 2:30 it was clear their attack also failed. Abercrombie then tried to recall the troops, but a significant number, notably the 42nd and 46th regiments on the British left, persisted in the attack. Around 5 pm the 42nd made a desperate advance that actually succeeded in reaching the base of the French wall; those that actually managed to scale the breastwork were bayoneted. One British observer noted that "Our Forces Fell Exceeding Fast", while another wrote that they were "Cut Down Like Grass". The slaughter went on until nightfall, with a great many men retreating behind a breastwork that had been erected at the back of the battlefield.

Finally realizing the scope of the disaster, Abercrombie ordered the troops to muster and march down to the landing on Lake George. The retreat in the dark woods became somewhat panicked and disorganized, as rumors of French attacks swirled among the troops. By dawn the next morning, the army was rowing back up Lake George, reaching its base at the southern end around sunset. The humiliating nature of the retreat was immediately apparent to some of its participants; Lieutenant Colonel Artemas Ward wrote that they "shamefully retreated".

== Aftermath ==
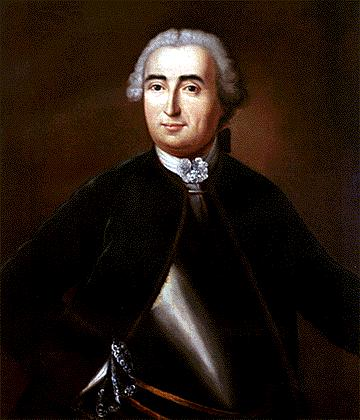
General Louis-Joseph de Montcalm

Montcalm, wary of a second British attack, and concerned about the fatigue of his troops after a long day of battle, had barrels of beer and wine brought forward to the lines. The troops spent the night alternating between sleeping and working on the defenses in anticipation of a renewed attack.

News of the battle was received in England shortly after news of the fall of Louisbourg, putting a damper on the celebrations marking that victory. The full scope of British victories in 1758 did not reach English shores until later in the year, when Pitt learned of the successes at Forts Duquesne and Frontenac, key steps in completing the conquest of New France. Had Carillon also fallen in 1758, the conquest might have been completed in 1758 or 1759; as it happened, Montreal (the last point of resistance) did not surrender until 1760, with campaigns launched from Fort Oswego, Quebec, and Carillon, which was captured and renamed Ticonderoga in 1759 by forces under the command of Jeffery Amherst, the victor at Louisbourg.

Abercrombie never led another military campaign. Although he was active at Lake George, he did little more than provide support for John Bradstreet's successful attack on Fort Frontenac, which was authorized in a war council on July 13. Bradstreet left with 3,000 men on July 23, and Abercrombie then refused to engage in further offensive acts, alleging a shortage of manpower. William Pitt, the British Secretary of State who had designed the British military strategy and received word of the defeat in August, wrote to Abercrombie on September 18 that the "King has judged proper that you should return to England." Abercrombie continued to be promoted, eventually reaching the rank of full General in 1772. James Holden, writing in 1911, noted that American and British writers, both contemporary and historical, used words like "imbecile", "coward", "unready", and "old woman" to describe Abercrombie.

The fact that Indians allied to the British witnessed the debacle first hand complicated future relations with them. News of the defeat circulated widely in their communities, which had a significant effect on the ability of British agents to recruit Indians to their side for future operations.

The disorganized nature of the British retreat demonstrated a loss of effective command. An experienced commander could easily have encamped at the Lake George landing, taken stock of the situation, and begun siege operations against the French. Abercrombie, to the surprise of some in his army, ordered a retreat all the way back to the south end of Lake George. Nester, unable to find other rational reasons for this, claims that the general must have panicked.

=== Casualties ===
The battle was the bloodiest of the war, with over 3,000 casualties suffered. French casualties are normally considered to be comparatively light: 104 killed and 273 wounded in the main battle. Combined with the effective elimination of Trépezet's force on July 6, there were about 550 casualties, about 13 per cent of the French force, a percentage similar to the losses of the British (who Chartrand calculates as having lost 11.5 to 15 per cent).

General Abercrombie reported 547 killed, 1,356 wounded, and 77 missing. Lévis in one report claimed that the French recovered 800 British bodies, implying that Abercrombie may have underreported the actual death toll. Chartrand estimates the number of British killed (or died of their wounds) at about 1,000 for the main battle, with about 1,500 wounded. The skirmish on July 6 cost the British about 100 killed and wounded, and the loss of General Howe.

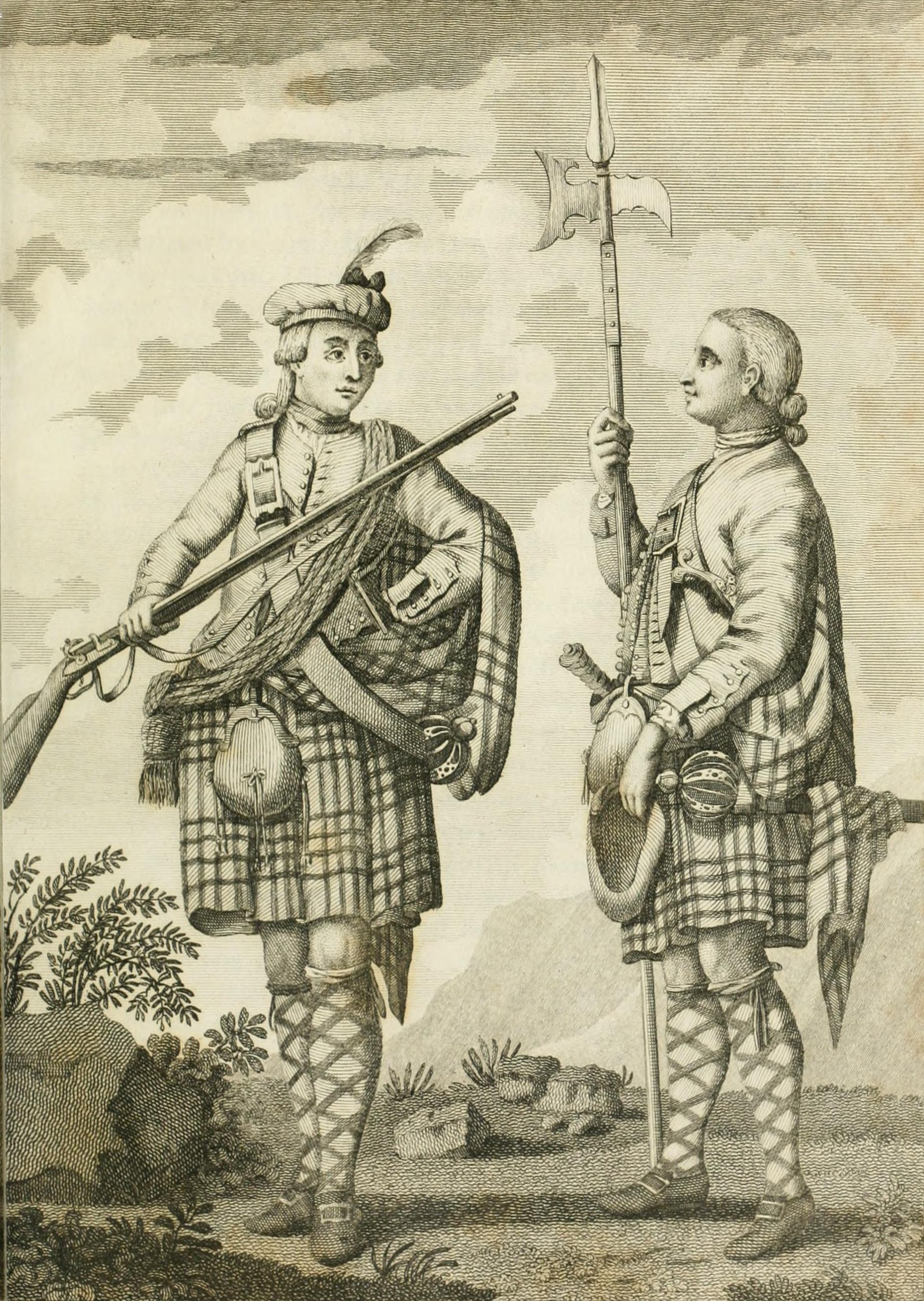
Officers of the Black Watch

The 42nd Regiment, known as the Black Watch, paid dearly with the loss of many lives and many severely wounded. More than 300 men (including 8 officers) were killed, and a similar number were wounded, representing a significant fraction of the total casualties suffered by the British. King George III, later in July 1758, designated the 42nd a "Royal" regiment, due to its gallantry in earlier battles, and issued letters of service for adding a second battalion "as a testimony of his Majesty's satisfaction and approbation of the extraordinary courage, loyalty, and exemplary conduct of the Highland regiment." However, the king did not learn of the regiment's loss of almost half its strength in this battle until August.

A legend has long circulated concerning the death of the Black Watch's Major Duncan Campbell. In 1742, the ghost of Campbell's dead brother is said to have appeared to him in a dream with a promise to meet him again at "Ticonderoga", a place name that was unknown to him at the time. Campbell died of wounds sustained during the battle.

=== Analysis ===
The actions of both commanders have been extensively analyzed in this action. While Montcalm performed well during the battle, some tactical options escaped his notice, and some of his actions in preparing the defenses at Carillon are open to question. In contrast, almost everything Abercrombie did has been questioned. It is widely held among historians that he was an incompetent commander.

Both commanders were a product of the environment of European warfare, which generally took place in open fields with relatively easy mobility, and were thus uncomfortable with woodland warfare. Neither liked the irregular warfare practiced by the Indians and British counterparts like Rogers' Rangers, but saw them as a necessary evil, given the operating environment. Although the French depended on Indian support to increase their comparatively small numbers throughout the war, Indian forces were quite low in this battle, and Montcalm generally disliked them and their practices.

Montcalm in particular would have benefited from practicing a more irregular form of warfare. He apparently never inspected the landing area at the north end of Lake George, which was a location from which he could contest the British landing. Furthermore, the French could then have used the confined woodlands to blunt the numerical advantage of the British, and contested the entire portage road. The fact that fortifications were built along the portage road but then abandoned by the French is one indication of this failure of strategic thinking. Nester estimates that contesting the first crossing on the portage road would have gained Montcalm an additional day for defensive preparations.

Criticisms of Abercrombie begin with his reliance on relatively poor intelligence. Reports reached him that the French strength at Carillon was 6,000, and that a further 3,000 were expected. Many of these reports were from French deserters or captives, and Abercrombie should have investigated them by sending out scouts or light infantry. Even if the reports were accurate, Abercrombie's army still significantly outnumbered that of Montcalm. The same sources must also have reported the shortage of provisions at the fort, a sign that a siege would have ended quickly.

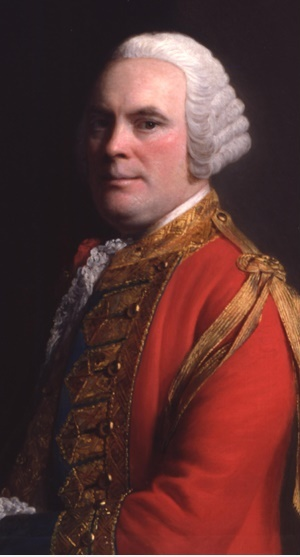
General James Abercrombie

Abercrombie's next error was an apparent over-reliance on the analysis of Matthew Clerk. His lack of experienced engineers caused the state of French defences to be repeatedly misread. What is clear is that Abercrombie, in his stated desire for haste, did not want to act on Clerk's recommendation to fortify Rattlesnake Hill, and then sought to blame Clerk, claiming he was merely acting on the engineer's advice. Clerk was one of the battle's casualties, so he was unavailable to defend himself against assignment of some of the blame. Captain Charles Lee of the 44th Foot wrote, on the prospect of using cannon on Rattlesnake Hill, "There was one hill in particular, which seem'd to offer itself as an ally to us, it immediately commanded the lines from hence two small cannon well planted must have drove the French in a very short time from their breast work [...] this was never thought of, which (one wou'd imagine) must have occur'd to any blockhead who was not absolutely so far sunk into Idiotism as to be oblig'd to wear a bib and bells."

The tactical decision not to bring cannons forward was probably one of Abercrombie's most significant errors. The use of cannon against the French works would have cleared paths through the abatis and breached the breastworks.

Abercrombie also had the option to avoid a pitched battle, instead beginning siege operations against the French position. His force was large enough that he could have fully invested the French position and fended off any arriving reinforcements.

=== Tactics ===
Abercrombie made two notable errors of judgment during the battle. One was a failure to recognize after the first wave of attacks that his chosen method of attack was unlikely to work. Instead of ordering additional waves of troops to the slaughter, he should have retreated to a safe distance and considered alternative actions. The second failure was that he apparently never considered ordering a flanking maneuver against the French right. At a minimum this would have stretched the French defenses, allowing his attackers elsewhere to find weak points. In fact, the French twice in the battle sent companies of militia out of their works on the right to enfilade the British attackers.

=== Legacy ===
The Carillon Flag, proposed as the flag of Quebec in 1902

The current Flag of Quebec

While the fort itself was never endangered by the British assault, Ticonderoga became a byword for impregnability. Even though the fort was effectively handed to the British by a retreating French army in 1759, future defenders of the fort and their superior officers, who may not have been familiar with the site's shortcomings, fell under the spell of this idea. In 1777, when General John Burgoyne advanced down Lake Champlain at the beginning of the Saratoga campaign, General George Washington, who had never seen the fort, thought highly of its defensive value. Anthony Wayne, who was at Fort Ticonderoga preparing its defenses before Burgoyne's arrival, wrote to Washington that the fort "can never be carried, without much loss of blood". Fort Ticonderoga was surrendered by the Americans without much of a fight in July 1777.

The modern flag of Quebec is based upon a banner reputedly carried by the victorious French forces at Carillon. The banner, now known as the flag of Carillon, dates back to the 17th century, confirmed by textile expert Jean-Michel Tuchscherer: "The flag is without doubt an exceptional piece of document from the 17th century". As for the coat of arm under the madonna now erased, they were most probably that of Charles, Marquis of Beauharnois (1671–1749), Governor of New France from 1726 to 1747: Silver on one side with a saber, mounted on three merlettes. Only the governor had the right to inscribe his personal crest on a banner with the arms of France, and only Beauharnois had the eagles to support his crest. The flag was probably fabricated around 1726, date of the arrival of Marquis de Beauharnois, and May 29, 1732, date when it was flown for the order of Saint Louis, with its motto: Bellicae virtutis praemium. However, historian Alistair Fraser is of the opinion that stories of the flag's presence on the battlefield appear to be a 19th-century fabrication, as there is no evidence that the large religious banner (2 by 3 meters, or 6 by 10 feet) on which the flag design was based was actually used as a standard at the battle.

=== Cultural references ===
A song called "Piper's Refrain" by Rich Nardin is based on the legend of a Scottish Highlander soldier, Duncan Campbell, who is doomed to die "at a place where he never had been" called Ticonderoga. He is a member of the Highland brigade and dies in the attack on the fort. There is another song by Margaret MacArthur on the same subject. The Nardin song was recorded by Gordon Bok, Anne Mayo Muir, and Ed Trickett on their album, And So Will We Yet.

The character Lieutenant Obadiah Lismahago in Tobias Smollett's novel, The Expedition of Humphry Clinker (1771) claims to have been scalped and left for dead during the battle of Ticonderoga.

The battle is also described, with some historical accuracy, in James Fenimore Cooper's 1845 novel Satanstoe.

== General and cited references ==
- Anderson, Fred (2005). The War that made America. New York: Viking. ISBN 0-670-03454-1.
- Anderson, Fred (2000). Crucible of War: The Seven Years' War and the Fate of Empire in British North America, 1754–1766. New York: Vintage Books. ISBN 978-0-375-70636-3. OCLC 253943947.
- Chartrand, René (2000). Ticonderoga 1758: Montcalm's Victory Against All Odds. Oxford: Osprey Publishing. ISBN 1-84176-093-5.
- Fraser, Alistair B (1998). "The Flags of Canada: Quebec". Archived from the original on April 1, 2009.
- Furneaux, Rupert (1971). The Battle of Saratoga. New York: Stein and Day. ISBN 0-8128-1305-7. OCLC 134959.
- Grossman, Mark (January 1, 2007). World Military Leaders: A Biographical Dictionary. Infobase Publishing. ISBN 978-0-8160-7477-8.
- Gipson, Lawrence Henry (1965). The British Empire before the American Revolution, Volume 7. New York: Knopf. OCLC 399957.
- Holden, James Austin; Wickes, Frank B (1911). The Campaign of 1758: New Historical Light on the Real Burial Place of George Augustus Lord Viscount Howe. Albany, New York: New York State Historical Association. OCLC 66271728. This work includes a printing of Abercrombie's dispatch describing the battle.
- Kingsford, William (1890). The History of Canada, Volume 4. Toronto: Roswell & Hutchinson. OCLC 3676642.
- Lonergan, Carroll Vincent (1959). Ticonderoga, Historic Portgage. Ticonderoga, New York: Fort Mount Hope Society Press. OCLC 2000876.
- Mante, Thomas (2005) [1772]. The History Of The Late War In North America And The Islands Of The West Indies: Including the Campaigns of 1763 to 1764 Against His Majesty's Indian Enemies. Kessinger. ISBN 978-1-4191-7814-6.
- Nester, William (2008). The Epic Battles of the Ticonderoga, 1758. Albany, New York: State University of New York Press. ISBN 978-0-7914-7321-4. OCLC 105469157. Archived from the original on October 6, 2007.
- Parkman, Francis (1884). France and England in North America: A Series of Historical Narratives, Volume 2. Boston: Little, Brown. OCLC 2886071.
- Stewart, David (1825). Sketches of the Character, Manners and Present State of the Highlanders of Scotland; with details of The Military Service of The Highland Regiments, Volume 1 (3rd ed.). Edinburgh: Archibald Constable. OCLC 1296777.
- "National Flags and Emblems of Quebec". Government of Québec.
