= Vehicle registration plates of Quebec =

Quebec
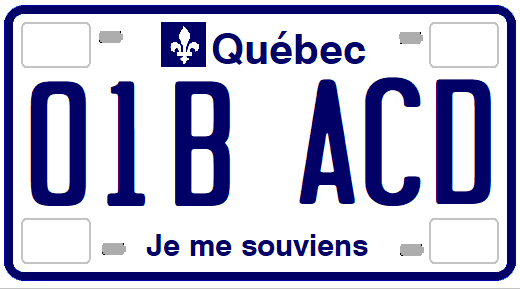

Current series
- Slogan: Je me souviens
- Size: 12 in × 6 in 30 cm × 15 cm
- Material: Aluminum
- Serial format: ABC 12D (late 2023 - Present); 12B ACD (early 2023); B12 ACD (2009 - 2023); 234 ABC (1996 - 2009); ABC 123 (1983 - 1996)
- Introduced: 1983

Availability
- Issued by: Société de l'assurance automobile du Québec
- Manufactured by: Relief Design Inc., Saint-Louis-de-Blandford, Quebec

History
- First issued: 1908

The Canadian province of Quebec first required its residents to register their motor vehicles in 1906. Registrants provided their own licence plates for display until 1908, when the province began to issue plates. As of 2026, plates are issued by the Société de l'assurance automobile du Québec (Quebec Automobile Insurance Corporation).

From 1963 to 1977 (except 1967), licence plates carried the slogan La Belle Province ("The Beautiful Province"), a nickname for Quebec. Since 1978, they have carried Je me souviens ("I remember"), the official motto of the province.

Since 1979, Quebec legislation has required only rear plates, though there are certain cases where front plates are also required. Annual renewal stickers were used from 1979 to 1992; Quebec is currently one of five provinces where such stickers are not used (the others being Saskatchewan, Manitoba, British Columbia and Ontario). Dates for renewals of plates on passenger vehicles are determined based on the first letter of the registered owner's surname, while for other vehicles they are determined based on the type of vehicle: for example, plates on passenger vehicles whose owners' surnames begin with the letter 'L' are to be renewed in September, as are school bus plates. Registrations and fees may be renewed up to three months in advance. Trailer plates ("R" category) are not renewed annually: they are only registered upon initial purchase, or when transferred to another owner. Enforcement is done by a variety of methods, including automated number plate recognition.

Vehicles registered in Quebec can only display approved plates. Decorative designs are permitted at the front of the vehicles, but displaying a plate with a design that can be "confused" with an official plate, or an official plate from any other jurisdiction, is an offence under articles 34 and 56 of the Highway Safety Code and punishable with a fine.

Relief Design Inc., of Saint-Louis-de-Blandford, Quebec, is the sole producer of licence plates on behalf of the Société de l'assurance automobile du Québec (SAAQ). The company is a sister company of Amherst, Nova Scotia-based Waldale Manufacturing Ltd.

== Size and specifications ==
Quebec vehicle registration plates come in two sizes

- Standard: 30 cm × 15 cm (12 in × 6 in)
- Small (Motorcycles, Mopeds, and Off-road vehicles): 20 cm x 10 cm (8 in x 4 in)

Quebec vehicle registration plates also come in two colours

- Standard: Blue on White (Matching the blue of The provincial flag)
- Electric Vehicles: Green on White

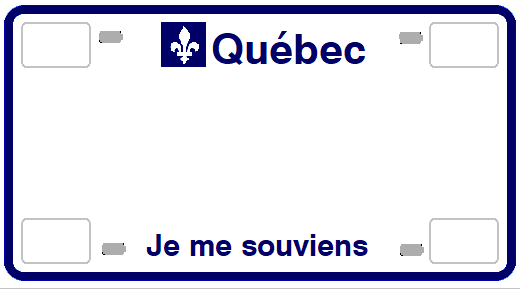
30 cm × 15 cm
(12 in × 6 in)
Blue on White
Blank Plate

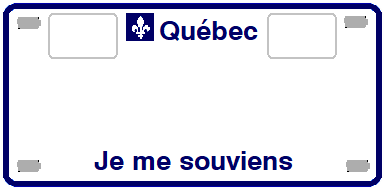
20 cm x 10 cm
(8 in x 4 in)
Blue on White
Blank Plate

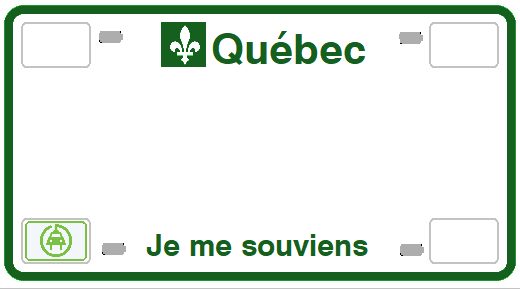
30 cm × 15 cm
(12 in × 6 in)
Green on White (Electrical)
Blank Plate

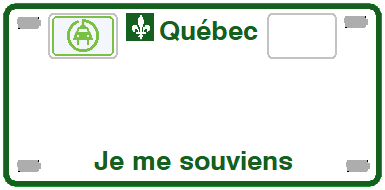
20 cm x 10 cm
(8 in x 4 in)
White (Electrical)
Blank Plate

== Vehicle categories ==
Certain vehicle categories are indicated on plates by the use of prefixes:

=== Active categories ===
Active categories	Prefix
Trucks, truck-trailer, and farm vehicles over 3000 kg	L
Buses and minibuses	A, AE, AP, AU
Restricted use vehicles (including vehicles used in remote areas not connected to the remainder of the road network, farm tractors, snowmobiles, vintage motorcycles and automobiles restricted to roads with speed limits below 70 km/h)	C
Removable plates (i.e.: garage and dealers)	X
Removable motorcycle and snowmobile plates	XA (only on small motorcycle plate)
Trailers	R
Vehicles used off public roadways (snowmobiles under 450 kg, and vehicles restricted to use in harbours, train stations and airports)	V
Other vehicles (including commercial, farm, driving school, occasional school use, road-going machines, snow removal vehicles, hearses, ambulances, tow trucks)	F
Consular and diplomatic staff vehicles (e.g. CC 123, CD 123)	CC, CD
Licensed amateur radio operators (e.g. VE2 AA, VE2 AAA, VA2 AA, VA2 AAA)	VE2, VA2

==== Taxi plates phase-out ====
The provincial government ceased the issuance of T plates on October 10, 2020, and phased out T plates on October 13, 2020, and March 31, 2021, following the enactment of a law to modernize the taxi industry. All T plates have been converted to either regular or commercial (F) plates.

=== Retired categories ===
Description	Expired prefix	Replaced by
Farm trailers registered before 1 January 1989	U	R
Government of Québec	GQ	F
Sureté du Québec provincial police force	GP	F
Government of Canada	G	F
Hearse	CO, H	F
Ambulance	AM, H	F
Rentals, short-term (less than one year).	ZZ	F
Commercial rentals/leases longer than one year.	Z, FZ	F

== Passenger baseplates ==
=== 1908 to 1978 ===
In 1956, Canada, the United States and Mexico came to an agreement with the American Association of Motor Vehicle Administrators, the Automobile Manufacturers Association and the National Safety Council that standardized the size for licence plates for vehicles (except those for motorcycles) at 6 inches (15 cm) in height by 12 inches (30 cm) in width, with standardized mounting holes. The 1955 (dated 1956) issue was the first Quebec licence plate that complied with these standards.

Image	Dates issued	Description	Slogan	Serial format	Serials issued	Notes
	1908–10	White serial on black rubber plate; vertical "PQ" at right	none	1234	1001 to approximately 3500	
	1911	White serial on blue porcelain plate; vertical "PQ" at right	none	1234	3501 to approximately 5400	
	1912	Dark blue serial on white fiberboard plate; vertical "PQ" at right	none	1234	1 to approximately 3200	
	1913	White serial on dark green fiberboard plate; "P.Q." centred at bottom	none	1234	4001 to approximately 9500	
	1914	Red serial on white fiberboard plate; vertical "PQ" at right	none	12345	9301 to approximately 16800	
	1915	Black serial on light green fiberboard plate; "QUEBEC" centred at bottom	none	12345	16901 to approximately 26500	First use of the full province name.
	1916	Black serial on gray fiberboard plate; "QUEBEC" centred at bottom	none	12345	26701 to approximately 42900	
	1917	Red serial on cream fiberboard plate; "QUEBEC" centred at bottom	none	12345	43501 to approximately 66800	
	1918	Black serial on cream fiberboard plate; "QUEBEC" centred within black bar at bottom	none	12345	64001 to approximately 67100, plus older serials	
	1919	Red serial on light yellow fiberboard plate; "QUEBEC" centred at bottom	none	12345	1 to approximately 34000	
	1920	Green serial on white fiberboard plate; "QUEBEC" centred within green bar at top	none	12345	1 to approximately 46500	
	1921	White serial on black fiberboard plate; "QUEBEC" centred at bottom	none	12345; 123-456	50001 to approximately 106-000	
	1922	Dark blue serial on white fiberboard plate; "QUEBEC" centred within dark blue bar at bottom	none	12345	1 to approximately 59000	
	1923	Yellow serial on black fiberboard plate; provincial coat of arms used as separator; "QUEBEC 1923" centred at bottom	none	12-345	10-001 to approximately 70-000	First dated plate.
	1924	Green serial on white fiberboard plate; "QUE - 24" centred at bottom	none	12345	10001 to approximately 82000	All-numeric serials issued on vehicles weighing less than 3,000 lb, and 'H' prefix serials on vehicles 3,000 lb or greater. This practice continued through 1936.
	1924	Green serial on white fiberboard plate; "QUE - 24" centred at bottom	none	H12345	H1001 to approximately H10500	All-numeric serials issued on vehicles weighing less than 3,000 lb, and 'H' prefix serials on vehicles 3,000 lb or greater. This practice continued through 1936.
	1925	Embossed white serial on black plate; "QUE–25" at bottom	none	12345	10001 to approximately 78000	First embossed plate.
	1925	Embossed white serial on black plate; "QUE–25" at bottom	none	H12345	H-1 to approximately H11000	First embossed plate.
	1926	Embossed white serial on maroon plate; "QUE–26" at bottom	none	12345	10001 to approximately 81000	
	1926	Embossed white serial on maroon plate; "QUE–26" at bottom	none	H12345	H-1 to approximately H16000	
	1927	Embossed black serial on yellow plate; "QUE–27" at bottom	none	12345	10001 to approximately 95000	
	1927	Embossed black serial on yellow plate; "QUE–27" at bottom	none	H12345	H-1 to approximately H20000	
	1928	Embossed black serial on light green plate; "QUE–28" at bottom	none	123456	10001 to approximately 108000	
	1928	Embossed black serial on light green plate; "QUE–28" at bottom	none	H12345	H-1 to approximately H19000	
	1929	Embossed white serial on black plate; "QUE–29" at bottom	none	123456	10001 to approximately 116000	
	1929	Embossed white serial on black plate; "QUE–29" at bottom	none	H12345	H-1 to approximately H27000	
	1930	Embossed black serial on yellow plate; "QUE–30" centred at top	none	123456	10001 to approximately 124000	
	1930	Embossed black serial on yellow plate; "QUE–30" centred at top	none	H12345	H-1 to approximately H33000	
	1931	Embossed white serial on maroon plate; "31–QUE" centred at bottom	none	123456	10001 to approximately 129000	
	1931	Embossed white serial on maroon plate; "31–QUE" centred at bottom	none	H12345	H-1 to approximately H32000	
	1932	Embossed black serial on light green plate; "32–QUE" centred at top	none	123456	10001 to approximately 127000	
	1932	Embossed black serial on light green plate; "32–QUE" centred at top	none	H12345	H-1 to approximately H32000	
	1933	Embossed white serial on dark blue plate with border line; vertical "QUE" and "33" at left and right respectively	none	123456	10001 to approximately 113000	
	1933	Embossed white serial on dark blue plate with border line; vertical "QUE" and "33" at left and right respectively	none	H12345	H-1 to approximately H30000	
	1934	Embossed black serial on gray plate with border line; vertical "34" and "QUE" at left and right respectively	none	123456	10001 to approximately 110000	
	1934	Embossed black serial on gray plate with border line; vertical "34" and "QUE" at left and right respectively	none	H12345	H-1 to approximately H31000	
	1935	Embossed white serial on dark green plate with border line; vertical "QUE" and "35" left and right respectively	none	123456	10001 to approximately 108000	
	1935	Embossed white serial on dark green plate with border line; vertical "QUE" and "35" left and right respectively	none	H12345	H-1 to approximately H35000	
	1936	Embossed black serial on yellow plate with border line; vertical "QUE" and "36" at left	none	12345	1 to approximately 99000	
	1936	Embossed black serial on yellow plate with border line; vertical "QUE" and "36" at left	none	H12345	H-1 to approximately H38000	
	1937	Embossed silver serial on green plate with border line; "QUEBEC 37" at bottom	none	123-456	1 to approximately 145-000	
	1938	Embossed silver serial on black plate with border line; "QUEBEC 38" at top	none	123-456	1 to approximately 167-000	
	1939	Embossed silver serial on maroon plate with border line; "QUEBEC 39" at bottom	none	123-456	1 to approximately 172-000	
	1940	Embossed white serial on black plate with border line; "QUEBEC 40" at top	none	123-456	1 to approximately 178-000	
	1941	Embossed white serial on green plate with border line; "QUEBEC 41" at bottom	none	123-456	1 to approximately 179-000	
	1942	Embossed black serial on white plate with border line; "QUEBEC 42" at top	none	123-456	1 to approximately 183-000	
	1943	Embossed yellow serial on black plate with border line; "QUEBEC -43" at bottom	none	123-456	1 to approximately 164-000	
	1944	Black serial on gray Masonite plate; "QUEBEC-44" centred at bottom	none	123-456	1 to approximately 175-000	Manufactured on Masonite due to metal conservation for World War II.
	1945	Embossed white serial on blue plate with border line; "QUEBEC–45" centred at top	none	123-456	1 to approximately 174-000	
	1946	Embossed orange serial on black plate with border line; "QUEBEC–46" centred at bottom	none	123-456	1 to approximately 177-000	
	1947	Embossed white serial on black plate with border line; "QUEBEC–47" centred at top	none	123-456	1 to approximately 188-000	
	1948	Embossed green serial on white plate with border line; "QUEBEC–48" centred at top	none	123-456	1 to approximately 232-000	
	1949	Embossed white serial on green plate with border line; "QUEBEC-49" at bottom	none	123-456	1 to approximately 271-000	
	1950	Embossed white serial with fleur-de-lys separator on azure plate with border line; "QUÉBEC-50" at top	none	123-456	1 to approximately 294-000	First base to feature the fleur-de-lys.
	1951	Embossed black serial with fleur-de-lys separator on unpainted aluminum plate with border line; "QUÉBEC-51" at top	none	123-456	1 to approximately 339-000	
	1952	Embossed orange serial with fleur-de-lys separator on azure plate with border line; "QUÉBEC-52" at top	none	123-456	1 to approximately 386-000	
	1953	Embossed black serial with fleur-de-lys separator on white plate with border line; "QUÉBEC-53" at bottom	none	123-456	2-001 to approximately 444-000	
	1954	Embossed black serial with fleur-de-lys separator on yellow plate with border line; "QUÉBEC-54" at top	none	123-456	2-001 to approximately 497-000	
	1955	Embossed yellow serial with fleur-de-lys separator on black plate with border line; "QUÉBEC-55" at bottom	none	123-456	2-001 to approximately 537-000	
	1956	Embossed green serial with fleur-de-lys separator on white plate with border line; "QUÉBEC-56" at top	none	123-456	2-001 to approximately 624-000	
	1957	Embossed white serial with fleur-de-lys separator on green plate with border line; "QUÉBEC-57" at bottom	none	123-456	2-001 to approximately 696-000	
	1958	Embossed black serial with fleur-de-lys separator on unpainted aluminum plate with border line; "QUÉBEC-58" at top	none	123-456	2-001 to approximately 749-000	
	1959	Embossed black serial with fleur-de-lys separator on yellow plate with border line; "QUÉBEC-59" at bottom	none	123-456	2-001 to approximately 807-000	
	1960	Embossed yellow serial with fleur-de-lys separator on black plate with border line; "QUÉBEC-60" at top	none	123-456	2-001 to approximately 840-000	
	1961	Embossed black serial with fleur-de-lys separator on white plate with border line; "QUÉBEC-61" at bottom	none	123-456	2-001 to approximately 915-000	
	1962	Embossed white serial with fleur-de-lys separator on black plate with border line; "QUÉBEC-62" at top	none	123-456	2-001 to approximately 998-000	
1963 License plate from Quebec	1963	Embossed dark green serial with fleur-de-lys separator on white plate with border line; "QUÉBEC-63" at top	"LA BELLE PROVINCE" at bottom	123-456	2-001 to 999-999	First use of the "La Belle Province" slogan.
1963 License plate from Quebec	1963	Embossed dark green serial with fleur-de-lys separator on white plate with border line; "QUÉBEC-63" at top	"LA BELLE PROVINCE" at bottom	12-345A	10-001A to approximately 92-000A	First use of the "La Belle Province" slogan.
	1964	Embossed dark green serial on yellow plate with border line; "QUÉBEC" centred above serial; fleur-de-lys and "64" at left, separated from serial by dividing line	"LA BELLE PROVINCE" below serial	123-456	2-001 to 999-999	
	1964	Embossed dark green serial on yellow plate with border line; "QUÉBEC" centred above serial; fleur-de-lys and "64" at left, separated from serial by dividing line	"LA BELLE PROVINCE" below serial	1A-2345	1A-0001 to approximately 9B-4000	
	1965	Embossed white serial on dark blue plate with border line; "QUÉBEC" centred above serial; fleur-de-lys and "65" at left, separated from serial by dividing line	"LA BELLE PROVINCE" below serial	1A-2345	1A-0001 to approximately 4V-2000	Letters F, I, J, L, O, Q, T and U not used in serials.
	1966	Embossed white serial on red plate with border line; "QUÉBEC" centred above serial; fleur-de-lys and "66" at left, separated from serial by dividing line	"LA BELLE PROVINCE" below serial	1A-2345	1A-0001 to approximately 3R-4500	Letters F, J and L added to serials.
	1967	Embossed red designs and lettering on white plate with embossed border line; Front and rear plates of different design. Front plate: Centred logo of the Montreal Expo 67, with fleur-de-lys on the left and along the bottom from left to right "1967", the vehicle's registration number, and "QUÉ."; Rear plate: "QUÉ." and maple leaf on the left, vehicle's registration on the right. Along the bottom from left to right "1867 CONFÉDÉRATION 1967".	Front plate: "MONTRÉAL EXPO67"; Rear plate: "CONFÉDÉRATION"	1A-2345	1A-0001 to approximately 8R-8500	Commemorated both the Montreal 1967 World Exposition and the centenary of Canadian confederation.
	1968	Embossed white serial on dark blue plate with border line; "QUÉBEC" centred above serial; fleur-de-lys and "68" at left, separated from serial by dividing line	"LA BELLE PROVINCE" below serial	1A-2345	1A-0001 to approximately 9S-0500	
	1969	Embossed black serial on white plate with border line; "QUÉBEC" centred above serial; fleur-de-lys and "69" at left, separated from serial by dividing line	"LA BELLE PROVINCE" below serial	1A-2345	1A-0001 to approximately 1V-2500	Letter T added to serials.
	1970	Embossed white serial on dark green plate with border line; "QUÉBEC" centred above serial; fleur-de-lys and "70" at left, separated from serial by dividing line	"LA BELLE PROVINCE" below serial	1A-2345	1A-0001 to 9Z-9999	Letters W and Y not used in serials.
	1971	Embossed black serial on metallic pea green plate with border line; "QUÉBEC" centred above serial; fleur-de-lys and "71" at left, separated from serial by dividing line	"LA BELLE PROVINCE" below serial	123-456	100-001 to 999-999	
	1971	Embossed black serial on metallic pea green plate with border line; "QUÉBEC" centred above serial; fleur-de-lys and "71" at left, separated from serial by dividing line	"LA BELLE PROVINCE" below serial	1A-2345	1A-0001 to approximately 8J-2500	
	1972	Embossed white serial on red plate with border line; fleur-de-lys, "QUÉBEC" and "72" at top	"LA BELLE PROVINCE" centred at bottom	123-456	100-001 to 999-999	
	1972	Embossed white serial on red plate with border line; fleur-de-lys, "QUÉBEC" and "72" at top	"LA BELLE PROVINCE" centred at bottom	1A-2345	1A-1 to approximately 9K-5000	
	1973	Embossed red serial with fleur-de-lys separator on white plate with border line; "19 QUÉBEC 73" at top	"LA BELLE PROVINCE" centred at bottom	123-456	10-01 to 999-999	
	1973	Embossed red serial with fleur-de-lys separator on white plate with border line; "19 QUÉBEC 73" at top	"LA BELLE PROVINCE" centred at bottom	1A-2345	1A-0001 to approximately 8M-1500	
	1974	Embossed black serial on yellow plate with border line; fleur-de-lys, "QUÉBEC" and "74" at top	"LA BELLE PROVINCE" centred at bottom	123A456	100A001 to 999A999; 100E001 to 999E999; 100H001 to approximately 450H000	
	1975	Embossed green serial on white plate with border line; "75", "QUÉBEC" and fleur-de-lys at top	"LA BELLE PROVINCE" centred at bottom	123A456	A, K, N, S and B series	
	1976	Embossed red serial on cream plate with border line; fleur-de-lys, "QUÉBEC" and "76" at top	"LA BELLE PROVINCE" at bottom, along with the logo of the 1976 Summer Olympics	123A456	H, L, M and P series	
	1977	Embossed dark blue serial on light blue plate ("Bleu Québec") with border line; fleur-de-lys and "Québec" at top left; "77" at top right	"La belle province" centred at bottom	123A456	R, S, T and V series	
	1978	Embossed brown serial on beige plate with border line; "78" at top left; fleur-de-lys and "Québec" at top right	"Je me souviens" centred at bottom	123A456	A, B, C, E and F series	Last single-year plate, and first use of the provincial motto.

=== 1979 to present ===
Image	Dates issued	Description	Slogan	Serial format	Serials issued	Notes
	1979–83	Embossed blue serial on reflective white plate with border line; "79" at top left; fleur-de-lys and "Québec" at top right	"Je me souviens" centred at bottom	123A456	H, P, L and M series; 100S000 to approximately 540S000	Front plates no longer issued.
	1983–96	As above, but with wider serial dies, a darker shade of blue, and fleur-de-lys and "Québec" centred at top	"Je me souviens" centred at bottom	ABC 123	AAA 001 to ZZZ 999	Validated with stickers until 1992. Letters I and O not used in this serial format, and U discontinued after the DMU series (1986). 'M' series reserved for motorcycles. Order of issuance was AAA to EZZ, JAA to KZZ, NAA to NZZ, QAA to RZZ, HAA to HBW, GAA to GZZ, HCA to HZZ, TAA to TZZ, WAA to ZZZ.
	1996 – September 2009	As above, but with wider serial dies, a darker shade of blue, and fleur-de-lys and "Québec" centred at top	"Je me souviens" centred at bottom	123 ABC	001 AAA to 999 ZZZ	Letters I, O and U not used in serials; this practice continues today. Series PAA through PCZ reserved for Veteran plates (below).
	September 2009 – December 2022	As above, but with wider serial dies, a darker shade of blue, and fleur-de-lys and "Québec" centred at top	"Je me souviens" centred at bottom	B12 CDE	B01 AAA to Z99 ZZZ	A, C, F, L, R, T and V not used as first letters in this serial format.
	December 2022 – c. September 15, 2023	As above, but with wider serial dies, a darker shade of blue, and fleur-de-lys and "Québec" centred at top	"Je me souviens" centred at bottom	12A BCD	01A AAA to 99R AHH (as of September 10, 2023)	B, D, Q and S not used as first letters in this serial format. Discontinued due to the possibility of too many inappropriate combinations of letters.
	c. September 15, 2023 – Present	As above, but with wider serial dies, a darker shade of blue, and fleur-de-lys and "Québec" centred at top	"Je me souviens" centred at bottom	ABC 12D	AAA 01A to BXX 05A (as of August 13, 2026)	B, D, Q and S not used as first letters in this serial format.

=== Optional plates ===
Image	Type	First issued	Description	Slogan	Serial format	Serials issued	Notes
	Veteran	January 1, 2006	As current passenger base, but with screened poppy graphic in the centre	Je me souviens	123 PBC	001 PAA to approximately 999 PAV	Issued to eligible veterans, subject to vetting standards set by the Royal Canadian Legion. For use on vehicles less than 3,000 kg.
	Veteran	2019	As current passenger base, but with graphics of a male and female soldier and a poppy field at right, a single poppy at bottom left, and "VÉTÉRANS" in red at top left	Je me souviens	123 PBC	001 PAW to 515 PBQ (as of December 20, 2020)	Issued to eligible veterans, subject to vetting standards set by the Royal Canadian Legion. For use on vehicles less than 3,000 kg.
	Electric	2011	green on reflective white with electric vehicle pictogram on lower left corner	Je me souviens	E00 VEA (passengers), A00000 (buses), FVE0000 (commercial <3000 kg)	E01 VEA to present; A00001 to present; FVE0001 to present.	Hybrid or all-electric vehicles only

== Non-passenger plates ==
Autobus plates have been simplified in the 1980s, AE (school bus), AP & AU are all considered A plates since.

Image	Type	Dates issued	Design	Serial format	Serials issued	Notes
	Bus		As current passenger plates	A 12345 AB12345	A 00001 to AE59028 (As of December 13, 2025)	
	Bus - Electric	2011–present	As current passenger plates	A 92345		
	Police car		As current passenger plates	FML1234		
	Sureté du Québec		As current passenger plates	FLV1234		
	Police bus		As current passenger plates	AP12345		
	Bus used as Fire or Emergency Vehicle		As current passenger plates	AU12345		
	Commercial	1979–83	As 1979–83 passenger plates	F123-456	F100-001 to approximately F585-000	
	Commercial	1983–86	As current passenger plates	F123456	F585001 to F999999	
	Commercial	1986–2001	As current passenger plates	FB12345	FA 1001 to FY99999; FF10001 to FF99999	
	Commercial	2001–present	As current passenger plates	FBC1234	FAA1001 to FWG2890 (as of August 9, 2026)	
	Commercial – Electric	2011–present	As current passenger plates	F123456		
	Commercial (Lighter than 3,000 kg) – Electric	2011–present	As current passenger plates	FVE1234		
	Consular Corps or Foreign delegation		As current passenger plates	CC 1234		
	Consular Corps or Foreign delegation - Electric	2011–Present	As current passenger plates	CC 12VE		
	Diplomatic Corps or ICAO		As current passenger plates	CD 1234		
	Diplomatic Corps or ICAO - Electric	2011–Present	As current passenger plates	CD 12VE		
	Licensed Amateur Radio Operator's Vehicle		As current passenger plates	VA2 AB; VE2 AB		
	Licensed Amateur Radio Operator's Vehicle		As current passenger plates	VA2 ABC; VE2 ABC		
	Moped (until 1989)	1979–85	Similar to 1979–83 passenger plates, but without slogan	123456	1001 to approximately 155000	Still currently revalidated.
	Moped (until 1989)	1985–89	Similar to current passenger plates	123 456	155 001 to approximately 223 000	Still currently revalidated.
	Motorcycle (until 1989)	1979–84	Similar to 1979–83 passenger plates, but without slogan	M-12345	M-00001 to M-99999	Still currently revalidated.
	Motorcycle (until 1989)	1979–84	Similar to 1979–83 passenger plates, but without slogan	M-B1234	M-A0001 to M-Z9999	Still currently revalidated.
	Motorcycle (until 1989)	1984–89	Similar to current passenger plates	MBC 123	MAA 001 to approximately MNZ 999	Still currently revalidated.
	Motorcycle/Moped (from 1989)	1989–92	Similar to current passenger plates	123 456	223 001 to approximately 307 000	
	Motorcycle/Moped (from 1989)	1992–2008	Similar to current passenger plates	123456	307001 to 999999	
	Motorcycle/Moped (from 1989)	2008–present	Similar to current passenger plates	12345A	10001A to 98555K (as of November 1, 2020)	
	Off-Road Vehicles		Similar to current passenger plates	VA12345		
	Off-Road Vehicles		Similar to current passenger plates	V12345A		
	Off-Road Vehicles - Electric	2011–Present	Similar to current passenger plates	V123VE		
	Removable (Dealer)		As current passenger plates	X 12345		
	Removable (Dealer)		As current passenger plates	X123456		
	Removable (Dealer) (Motorcycles, Mopeds, and Off-road vehicles)		Similar to current passenger plates	XA12345		
	Restricted-area use Vehicle		As current passenger plates	C123456		
	Restricted-area use Vehicle - Electric		As current passenger plates	C1234VE		
	Tractor		Similar to current passenger plates	C012345		
	Trailer	2007–present	As current passenger plates	RB1234C	RA0001A to RP9670M (as of July 30, 2023)	
	Truck		As current passenger plates	L123456		
	Truck - Electric	2011–Present	As current passenger plates	L123VE		

=== Taxis ===
The provincial government ceased the issuance of T plates on October 10, 2020, and phased out T plates on October 13, 2020, and March 31, 2021, following the enactment of a law to modernize the taxi industry. All T plates have been converted to either regular or commercial (F) plates.

Image	Type	Dates issued	Design	Serial format	Serials issued	Notes
	City Taxi	–2021/03	As current passenger plates	T123456		The first two digits indicate the area where the taxi operates: 01: Boucherville; 02: Longueuil (Note: Also includes Brossard and Saint-Lambert.); 03: Candiac/La Prairie; 04: Cowansville; 05: Montréal (Eastern) (Note: Boroughs of Rivière-des-Prairies/Pointe-aux-Trembles, Saint-Léonard, Anjou & Montréal-Nord, and the town of Montréal-Est.); 06: Joliette (Note: Also includes Saint-Paul, Crabtree, Saint-Pierre, Notre-Dame des-Prairies, Saint-Charles-Borromée and Notre-Dame-de-Lourdes.); 07: Lachute (Note: Also includes Brownsburg-Chatham.); 08: Laval; 09: Matane (Note: Part of the town including the former municipalities of Matane, Petit-Matane & Saint-Jérôme-de-Matane, as of September 25th 2001.); 10: Mont-Joli (Note: Also includes Sainte-Flavie.); 11: Montreal (Central/Downtown) (Note: Boroughs of Outremont, Saint-Laurent, Verdun, LaSalle, Ahuntsic/Cartierville, Côte-des-Neiges/Notre-Dame-de-Grâce, Mercier/Hochelaga/Maisonneuve, Le Plateau Mont-Royal, Rosemont/La Petite-Patrie, le Sud-Ouest, Ville-Marie & Villeray/Saint-Michel/Parc-Extension, and the Towns of Mont-Royal, Westmount, Côte-Saint-Luc, Hampstead & Montréal-Ouest.); 12: Montreal (Western) (Note: Boroughs of L'Île-Bizard/Sainte-Geneviève & Pierrefonds/Roxboro, and the Towns of Dorval, Dollard-des-Ormeaux, Pointe-Claire, Kirkland, Beaconsfield, Senneville, Sainte-Anne-de-Bellevue & Baie-d'Urfé.); 13: Rivière-du-Loup; 14: Saint-Eustache (Note: Also includes Deux-Montagnes, Sainte-Marthe-sur-le-Lac, Pointe-Calumet & Saint-Joseph-du-Lac. Excludes Lemay Terrace area (See Zone 54).); 15: Saint-Jérôme; 16: Sorel-Tracy (Note: Also includes Saint-Joseph-de-Sorel & Sainte-Anne-de-Sorel.); 17: Terrebonne (Note: Also includes Mascouche.); 18: Thetford Mines (Note: Part of the City, including the former towns of Robertsonville, Thetford Mines & Thetford-Partie-Sud); 19: Victoriaville (Note: Also includes Saint-Christophe-d'Arthabaska); 20: Alma (Note: Excluding the former Municipality of Delisle.); 21: Baie-Comeau (Note: Also includes Pointe-Lebel.); 22: Beauharnois; 23: Beloeil (Note: Also includes McMasterville, Otterburn Park & Mont-Saint-Hilaire.); 24: Saint-Bruno-de-Montarville (Note: Also includes Saint-Basile-Le-Grand.); 25: Québec (Charlesbourg); 26: Châteauguay (Note: Also includes Mercier & Léry.); 27: Saguenay (La Baie); 28: Dolbeau-Mistassini; 29: Drummondville (Note: Part of the City formed by the former municipalities of Saint-Nicéphore, Drummondville & Saint-Charles-de-Drummond, and also includes Saint-Germain-de-Grantham, Saint-Cyrille-de-Wendover & Saint-Majorique-de-Grantham.); 30: Québec (Beauport); 31: Gaspé; 32: Repentigny (Repentigny); 33: Granby; 34: Gatineau (Hull); 35: Lévis (Central/Downtown) (Note: Only the former territory of the City before January 1, 2002, now known as the Borough of "Desjardins".); 36: Quebec (Central/Downtown) (Note: Former municipalities of Québec, Vanier & Loretteville, and the Parish Municipality of Notre-Dame-des-Anges.); 37: Rimouski (Note: Part of the City, including the former municipalities of Pointe-au-Père, Rimouski, Rimouski-Est & Sainte-Odile-sur-Rimouski.); 38: Quebec (Sainte-Foy—Sillery) (Note: Borough of Sainte-Foy—Sillery—Cap-Rouge, and municipalities of L'Ancienne-Lorette & Saint-Augustin-de-Desmaures); 39: Saint-Hyacinthe (Note: Also includes La Présentation.); 40: Trois-Rivières (Note: Excluding the former Municipalities of Saint-Louis-de-France & Pointe-du-Lac.); 41: Saint-Jean-sur-Richelieu; 42: Shawinigan (Note: Excluding the former Municipalities of Saint-Gérard-des-Laurentides & Saint-Jean-des-Piles. Also includes Saint-Boniface.); 43: Sherbrooke; 44: Salaberry-de-Valleyfield (Note: Also includes Saint-Louis-de-Gonzague & Saint-Stanislas-de-Kostka.); 45: Amos; 46: Chibougamau; 47: Matagami; 48: Rouyn-Noranda (Central/Downtown) (Note: Only the urban area (former territory of the City before January 1, 2002) is included.); 49: Val-d'Or (Note: Excluding the former Municipalities of Dubuisson & Vassan.); 50: La Tuque (Note: Only the urban area (former territory of the City before March 26, 2003) is included.); 51: Saguenay (Jonquière); 52: Saguenay (Chicoutimi); 53: Sept-Îles (Note: Excludes the former municipality of Gallix.); 54: Sainte-Thérèse (Note: Also includes Blainville, Rosemère, Lorraine, Bois-des-Filion, Boisbriand & Saint-Eustache's Lemay Terrace (who was part of Boisbriand before January 1, 2011).); 55: Gatineau (Gatineau); 56: Repentigny (Le Gardeur) (Note: Also includes Charlemagne.); 57: Vaudreuil-Dorion (Note: Also includes Pointe-des-Cascades, L'Île-Perrot, Notre-Dame-de-l'Île-Perrot, Pincourt, Terrasse-Vaudreuil, L'Île-Cadieux & Vaudreuil-sur-le-Lac.)
	Hospital Taxi	–2021/03	As current passenger plates	TB 1234		
	Regional Taxi	–2021/03	As current passenger plates	TR12345		
	Special Taxi (Limousines mainly)	–2021/03	As current passenger plates	TS 1234		
