= Maurice Brodeur =

Canadian heraldist (1894–1959)

- Born: 13 July 1894; Montreal, Quebec, Canada
- Died: 6 August 1959 (aged 65); Quebec City, Quebec, Canada
- Occupations: Heraldist, civil servant, illustrator
- Spouse: Lucina Boily (m. 1924)
- Parents: Donat Brodeur (father); Marie-Louise Marmette (mother)

Maurice Brodeur (13 July 1894 - 6 August 1959) was a Canadian heraldist from Quebec. He was one of the few heraldists to specialize in government institutions before the establishment of the Canadian Heraldic Authority. He designed the 1939 version of the coat of arms of Quebec.

== Biography ==
Brodeur was born in Montreal to lawyer Donat Brodeur and writer Marie-Louise Marmette.

Brodeur was a civil servant and rose to become a senior clerk in the Department of Highways in 1941, became chief clerk in the Department of Public Instruction the next year. In 1949 he was appointed as an archives clerk for the Provincial Secretariat. He also served as head of the secretariat's heraldic service.

In 1936, Brodeur proposed a flag for Quebec featuring a white cross and a central maple leaf bearing a gold fleur-de-lis. He was also the designer of the 1939 version of the coat of arms of Quebec, which modified the arms granted by Queen Victoria in 1868. In 1948 when the flag of Quebec was being created its design incorporated the fleur-de-lis from his earlier designs.

== Selected designs ==
=== Coats of arms ===
- Quebec (1939)
- Quebec City (1949)
- Loretteville (1952)
- Hull (1959)
- Faculty of Business Administration, Université Laval

=== Flags ===
Proposed national flag of Canada (1930)

The "Jacques Cartier" flag, designed for the Société nationale Jacques Cartier (1934)

Flag of Quebec's 4-H clubs (1943)
