= 80th Regiment of Light-Armed Foot =

Former regiment of the British Army

The 80th Regiment of Light-Armed Foot was the first light infantry regiment in the British Army.

== History ==
The regiment was raised by Colonel Thomas Gage as the 80th Regiment of Light-Armed Foot in May 1758. The purpose of this unit was to provide a formal regiment that could combat France and its Native American allies during the French and Indian War, while adopting such tactics and equipment that had been proven by Roger's Rangers. Viewing the rangers as often unreliable and ill-disciplined, Lord Loudoun, commander-in-chief in North America following the advice of the Duke of Cumberland; "till Regular Officers with men that they can trust, learn to beat the woods, & act as Irregulars, you will never gain any certain Intelligence of the Enemy...." Lord Loudoun sought to fill the void by creating two light infantry companies in every British regiment. The men Loudoun would have had lead those companies were sent to Robert Rogers. He formed them into the Cadet Company in the fall of 1757, in which he was charged by Lord Loudoun the task of teaching them the methods of the rangers. Lord Loudoun scrapped his plan when Lieutenant Colonel Thomas Gage proposed raising and clothing a regiment of 500 "rangers" at his own expense, though to be reimbursed if his proposal received royal approval.

The uniform of the 80th consisted of a short, brown regimental coat, brown waistcoat, brown breeches, and black or brown full length gaiters, though there are deserter descriptions with men of Gage's described as wearing blue woolen leggings. The facings on the coat were the same as the main color. The coat buttons may have been plain pewter painted black or japanned, but might also have been made of black horn. The hat was made from jacked leather and an ostrich plume, giving rise to the nickname of "Leathercaps". It resembled a jockey's cap.

The regiment took part in the Battle of Carillon in July 1758 and the Battle of Ticonderoga in July 1759 during the French and Indian War. A detachment from the regiment went on to take part in the Battle of Devil's Hole during Pontiac's Rebellion before the regiment was disbanded in 1763.

== Sources ==
- Alden, John Richard (1969) [1948]. General Gage in America. New York: Greenwood Press. ISBN 978-0-8371-2264-9.
- Anderson, Fred (2005). The War that made America. New York: Viking. ISBN 0-670-03454-1.
- Brumwell, Stephen (2002). Redcoats: The British Soldier and War in the Americas, 1755–1763. New York: Cambridge University Press. ISBN 0-521-80783-2.
- Kingsford, William (1890). The History of Canada, Volume 4. Toronto: Roswell & Hutchinson. OCLC 3676642.
- Mays, Thomas (2017). American Guerrillas: From the French and Indian Wars to Iraq and Afghanistan—How Americans Fight Unconventional Wars. Lyons Press. ISBN 978-1493022298.
- Scull, G.D. (1882). Collections of the New York Historical Society for the Year 1881. Publication Fund. XIV. The Montressor Journals.
