= Thomas Mante =

Thomas Mante (c. 1733–c. 1802) was an English army officer, historian and military writer, and spy in the pay of the French government. Before 1773 he wrote his name as Thomas Mant.

== Life ==
Mante served in the Royal Marines from 1756 to 1762, and fought against the French in the Caribbean. At the end of the Seven Years' War, he served in the 77th Regiment of Foot at the siege of Havana, and then at New York, in 1762. The regiment was broken up soon afterwards, but Mante then joined Henry Bouquet in his 1763 campaign that formed part of Pontiac's War. During 1764 Mante was attached to John Bradstreet, as brigade major, in the expedition leading to the siege of Fort Detroit.

Later in 1764 Mante was in London. He has been taken to be the author of the 1765 plan to plant a British colony at Detroit, which was rejected. Running up debts, Mante offended his patrons, Bradstreet and Sir Charles Gould. He became involved in British intelligence work through dealings in the 1770s with the government official John Robinson; but he had already by then been recruited to spy for the French, from 1769, by Jean-Charles-Adolphe Grant de Blairfindy.

Mante's role as a double agent was probably known to the British by 1774, when they ceased to pay him. He had emigrated to Dieppe in northern France in 1773, and spent time in debtors' prison. To make ends meet he wrote, producing a work in French on agriculture, and novels in English based on French originals, published by Thomas Hookham. He was back in London in 1781, and at the end of his life was working still on his Naval and Military History.

== Works ==
Mante wrote:

- History of the late War in America, including the Campaigns against His Majesty's Indian Enemies, London, 1772.
- Treatise on the Use of Defensive Arms, translated from the French of Joly de Maizeray, with Remarks, London, 1771.
- Elementary Principles of Tactics (1771).
- System of Tactics, translated from the French of Joly de Maizeray, 1781, dedicated to Guy Carleton, lord Dorchester, London, 1781.
- Naval and Military History of the Wars of England, including those of Scotland and Ireland, London, 1795?-1807. The last two volumes were completed by another author.

== Notes ==
Attribution

This article incorporates text from a publication now in the public domain: Lee, Sidney, ed. (1893). "Mante, Thomas". Dictionary of National Biography. Vol. 36. London: Smith, Elder & Co.
