= Je me souviens =

Official motto of Quebec

Coat of arms of Quebec bearing the motto Je me souviens.

Je me souviens (French pronunciation: [ʒə mə suvjɛ̃]) is the official motto of Quebec, and translated literally into English means: "I remember." The exact meaning of this short sentence is subject to several interpretations, though all relate to the history of the Quebec people. The motto can be found on all Quebec licence plates, among other things.

== Origins ==
Étienne-Paschal Taché is credited with having popularized the phrase. In 1883, his son Eugène-Étienne Taché, Assistant Commissioner for Crown lands in Quebec and architect of the provincial Parliament building, had the motto carved in stone below the coat of arms of Quebec which appears above the Parliament Building's main entrance door. The motto then came into official use, even though the coat of arms was not adopted until 1939.

== Meaning ==
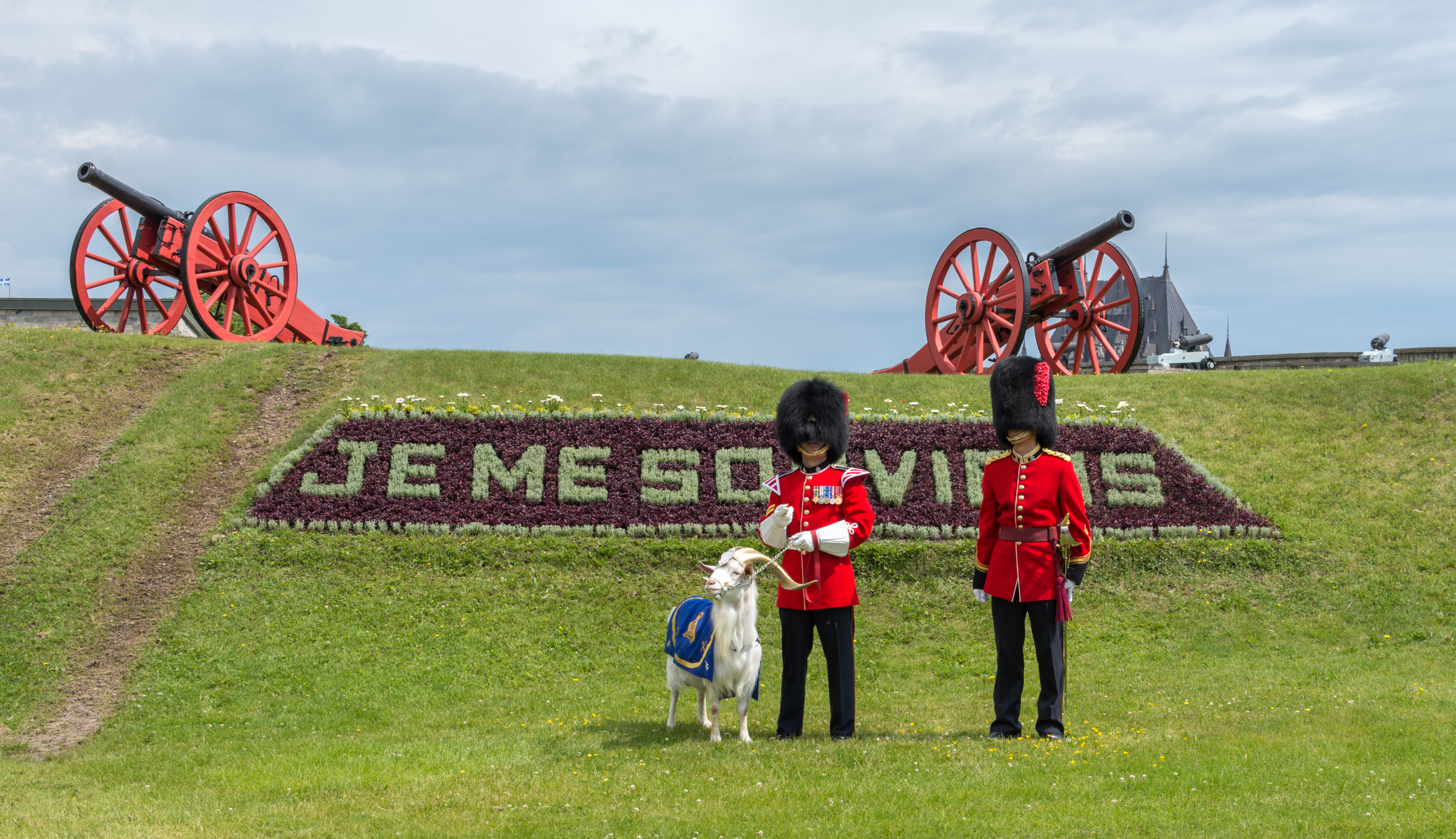
Je me souviens on a changing of the guard ceremony in Quebec City

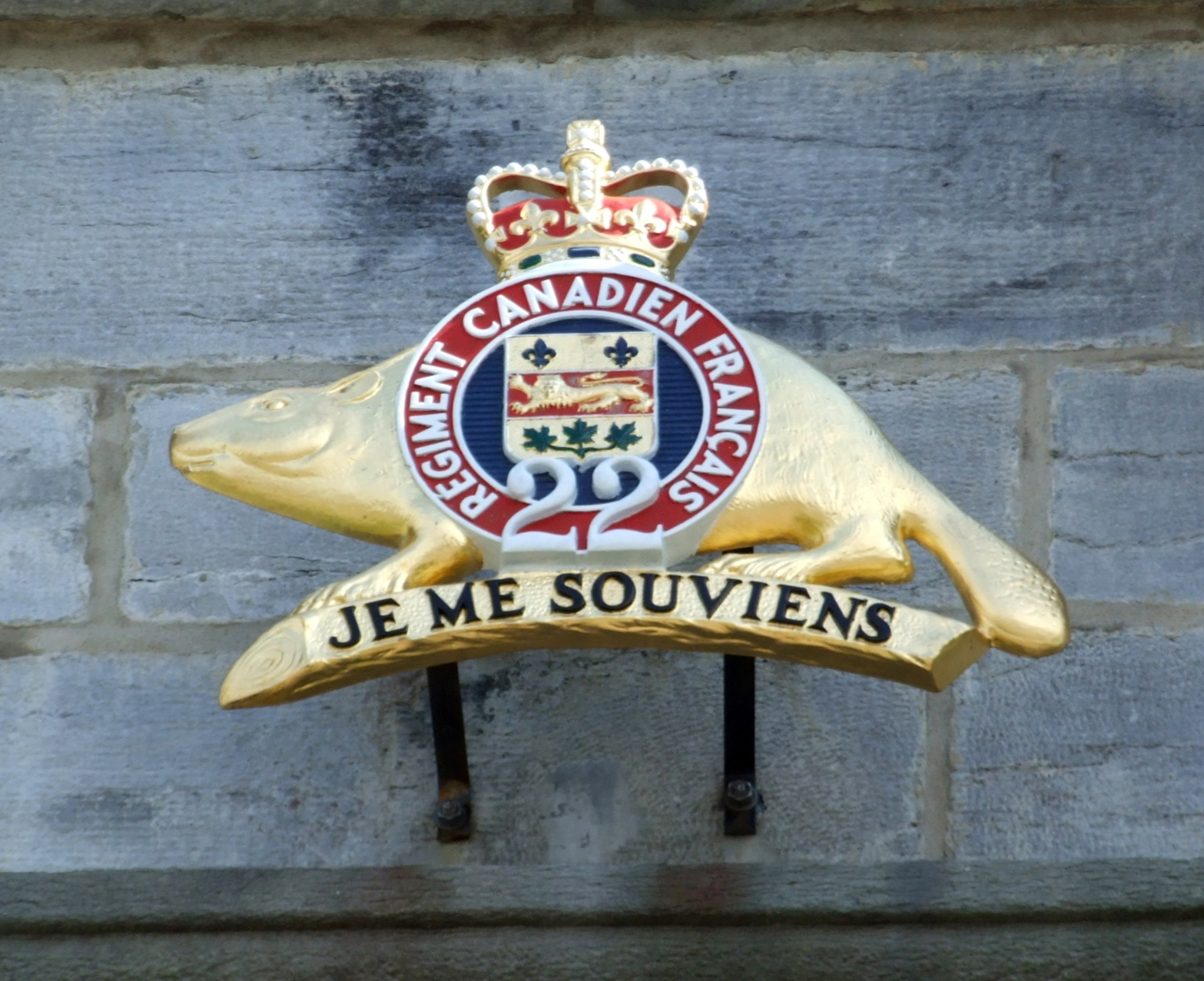
Royal 22^{e} Régiment badge at the Citadelle of Quebec includes regimental motto Je me souviens

Taché appears not to have left an explanation of the motto's intended meaning but he wrote a letter to the deputy minister of public works, Siméon Le Sage, that showed what he intended to accomplish with the statues on the building's façade and described what they were intended to remind people of.

All around the Parliament building, there are 24 statues of historical figures. They originally included founders (Jacques Cartier, Samuel de Champlain, and de Maisonneuve); clerics (de Laval, de Brébeuf, Marquette, and Olier); military figures (de Frontenac, Wolfe, de Montcalm, and de Levis); First Nations Peoples; French governors (D'Argenson, de Tracy, de Callières, de Montmagny, d'Ailleboust, de Vaudreuil); and, in the words of Taché, "some English governors the most sympathetic to our nationality" (Murray, Dorchester, Prevost, and Bagot), and Lord Elgin, who was given a special place for he was seen as an important player in obtaining "responsible government". Taché left empty spaces to allow future generations to add their own statues.

His contemporaries, however, offered their own interpretations, including historian Thomas Chapais and civil servant Ernest Gagnon.

Chapais, during a speech given for the occasion of the unveiling of a bronze statue honouring de Lévis, on June 24, 1895, said:

The province of Quebec has a motto of which she is proud and which she likes enough to carve it on her monuments and palaces. This motto has only three words: Je me souviens; but these three words, in their simple economy of expression, are worth more than the most eloquent speeches. Yes, we remember. We remember the past and its lessons, the past and its misfortunes, the past and its glories.

In 1896, Gagnon wrote that the motto "admirably sums up the raison d'être of Champlain and Maisonneuve's Canada as a distinct province in the confederation."

In 1919, seven years after Taché's death, the historian Pierre-Georges Roy underlined the symbolic character of the three-word motto: "which says so eloquently in three words, the past as well as the present and the future of the only French province of the confederation." This sentence would be cited or paraphrased several times afterwards.

Various scholars have attempted to discover the source of Taché's words. The ethnologist Conrad Laforte has suggested that they might derive from the song Un Canadien errant, or possibly Victor Hugo's poem "Lueur au couchant". Writer André Duval thought the answer was simpler and closer at hand: In the hall of the Parliament building in which the motto is carved above the door, are the arms of the Marquess of Lorne whose motto was ne obliviscaris ("do not forget"). Consequently, Duval believed "the motto of Quebec to be at the same time the translation of the Marquess of Lorne's motto and the answer of a French-Canadian subject of Her Majesty to the said motto."

Research published in English before 1978 led to the same conclusions regarding the motto's origin, the number of words it has and its interpretation. A 1934 biographical notice about Taché reads:

M. Taché is also the author of the beautiful poetic and patriotic motto which accompanies the official coat of arms of the Province of Quebec — Je me souviens — the full significance of which cannot perhaps be readily expressed in English words but which may be paraphrased as conveying the meaning 'We do not forget, and will never forget, our ancient lineage, traditions and memories of all the past'.

Encyclopedias and quotation dictionaries, including those of Wallace, Hamilton, Colombo, and Hamilton and Shields, all provide the same information as the French-language sources.

In 1955, the historian Mason Wade wrote: "When the French Canadian says Je me souviens, he not only remembers the days of New France but also the fact that he belongs to a conquered people."

== Replacement of la belle province ==
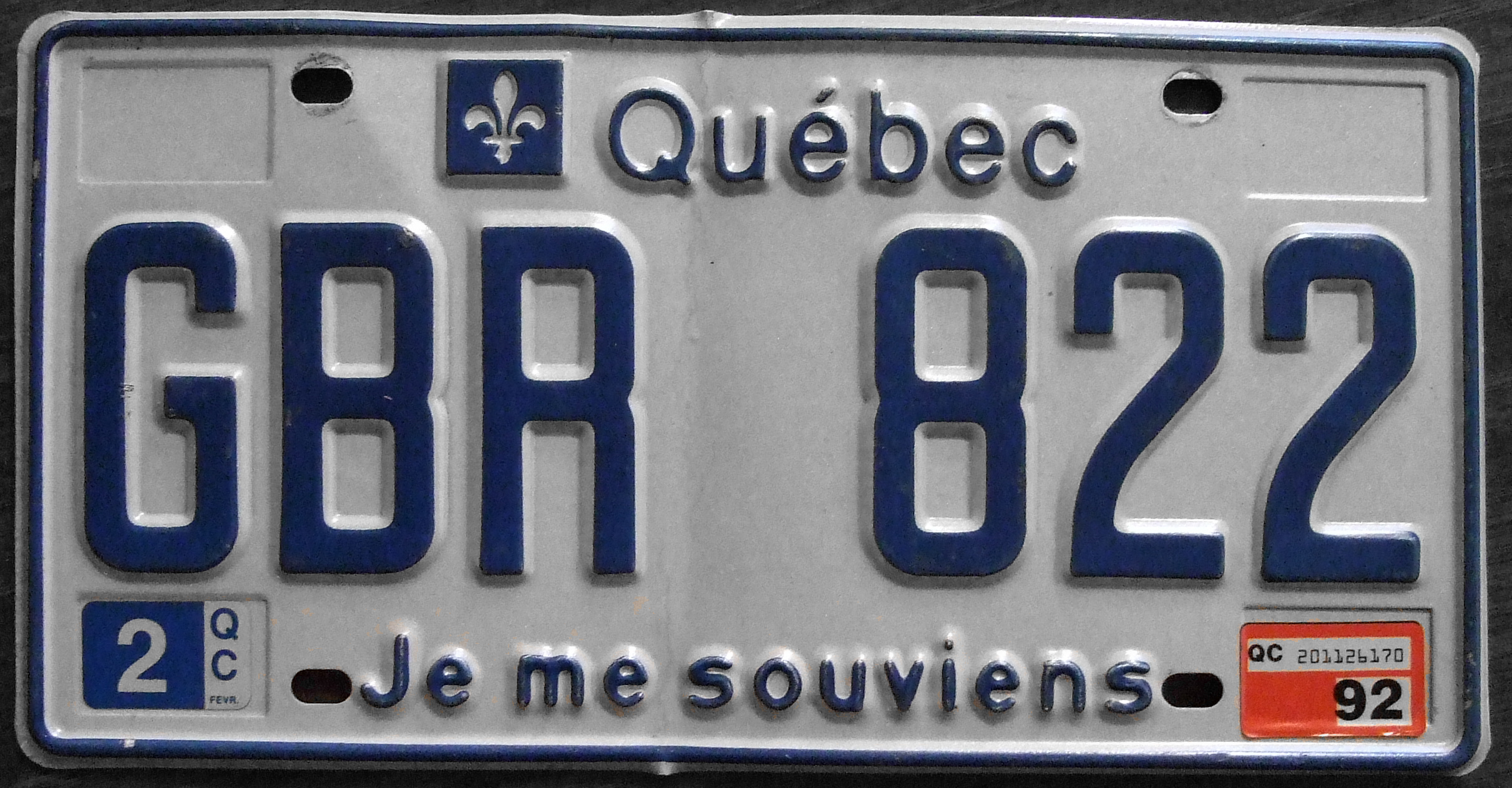
Since 1978, Quebec licence plates have featured the phrase "Je me souviens"

In 1978, Je me souviens replaced the tourism-oriented motto la belle province ("the beautiful province") on Quebec's vehicle registration plate. According to the historian Gaston Deschênes, this event marks the start of a new period of attempts to reinterpret the meaning of the motto in the mainstream media of Canada.

On February 4, 1978, Robert Goyette signed an article entitled "Car owners argue over motto" in The Montreal Star. This article attracted the attention of a reader, Hélène Pâquet, a granddaughter of Taché who replied on February 15 in an open letter entitled Je me souviens. It reads in part:

According to [Goyette's] article, there is confusion about the Quebec motto. As you mentioned, it was written by E. E. Taché. "Je me souviens" is only the first line, which may be the cause of the confusion. It goes like this:

Je me souviens/ Que né sous le lys/ Je croîs sous la rose.

I remember/ That born under the lily/ I grow under the rose.

The passage refers to the fleur-de-lis and the Tudor rose, as the floral emblems of France and England respectively. The idea that the motto had a lesser known second part spread widely. This new piece of information had a long life in the media before it was investigated by Deschênes in 1992.

When Deschênes contacted Hélène Pâquet in 1992, she was unable to specify the origin of text she quoted in her letter. Her statements were not conformable to those of her father, Lieutenant-Colonel Étienne-Théodore Pâquet Jr., who on March 3, 1939, wrote in a letter to John Samuel Bourque, Tâché's son-in-law, and Minister of Public Works, that "the one who synthesized in three words the history and traditions of our race deserves to be recognized" as much as Routhier and Lavallée who composed "O Canada".

The origin of the second part is today known to be a second motto, created by the same Eugène-Étienne Taché, many years after the first one, and originally destined to be used on a monument honouring the Canadian nation, but which was never built. The monument was to be a statue of a young and graceful adolescent girl, an allegoric figure of the Canadian nation, bearing the motto: "Née dans les lis, je grandis dans les roses / Born in the lilies, I grow in the roses". While the project was never realized, the idea was "recycled" in a commemorative medal for the 300th anniversary of the foundation of Quebec City, created by Taché, on which is written "Née sous les lis, Dieu aidant, l'œuvre de Champlain a grandi sous les roses" ("Born under the lilies, God helping, Champlain's work has grown under the roses").

== Other uses ==
Je me souviens appears on the badge of the Royal 22^{e} Régiment, a francophone regiment of the Canadian Forces. The first version of the badge was designed in 1914.

== See also ==
- Je me souviens (2002), a documentary film
- Je me souviens (2009), a drama film
- List of Canadian provincial and territorial symbols
- Un Canadien errant, 1842 song by Antoine Gérin-Lajoie that includes Va, dis à mes amis que je me souviens d'eux.
- Lest we forget
