= Flag of Quebec =

Canadian provincial flag

Quebec
- Fleurdelisé
- Use: Civil and state flag
- Proportion: 2∶3
- Adopted: January 21, 1948; 78 years ago
- Design: A blue field charged with a symmetric cross between four fleurs-de-lis
- Designed by: René Chaloult

The flag of Quebec (drapeau du Québec), called the Fleurdelisé in French (pronounced [flœʁdəlize]), represents the Canadian province of Quebec. It consists of a white cross on a blue background, with four white fleurs-de-lis.

It was the first provincial flag officially adopted in Canada and was originally shown on January 21, 1948, at the Parliament Building in Quebec City, during the administration of Maurice Duplessis. Legislation governing its usage was enacted on March 9, 1950. Quebec's Flag Day (January 21) commemorates its adoption each year, although for some time it was celebrated in May.

== Symbolism ==
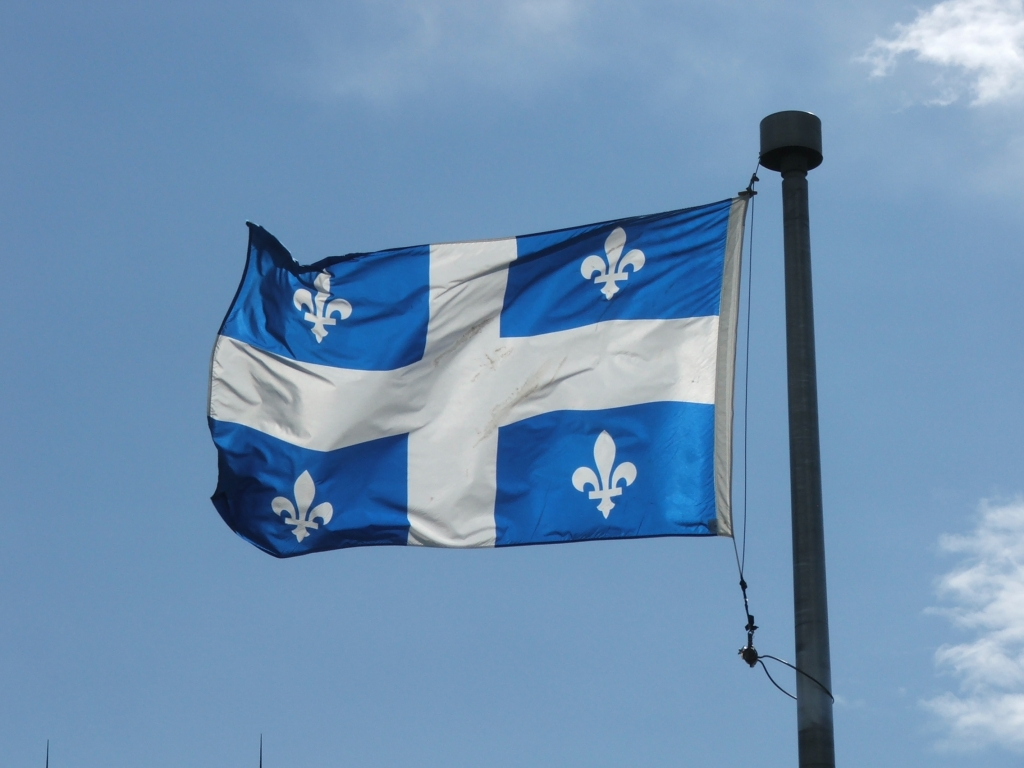
Official flag with 2:3 proportions

The Fleurdelisé takes its white cross over a blue field from certain French flags of the Kingdom of France, namely the French naval flag as well as the French merchant flag. Its white fleurs-de-lis (symbolizing purity) and blue field (symbolizing heaven) come from a banner honouring the Virgin Mary; such banners were carried by Canadian colonial militia in the 18th century. The fleurs-de-lis, as a symbol has often been associated with France, specifically the Kingdom of France. The flag is blazoned Azure, a cross between four fleurs-de-lis argent. Its horizontal symmetry allows both sides of the flag to show the same image.

=== Bourbon flag ===
The royal banner of France or "Bourbon flag" was the first and most commonly used flag in New France. The banner has three gold fleurs-de-lis on a dark blue field (arranged two and one), and it was also present on the French naval flag.

Naval flag of the Kingdom of France

The royal banner of France or "Bourbon flag"

== Protocol ==
Unofficial (but commonly seen) 2-1 variant

The flag's official ratio is 2:3 (width to length), but the flag is very often seen as a 1:2 variant to match the flag of Canada in size when flying together.

The official shade of blue is Pantone 293. In 8-bit RGB, it is #003399. Unofficial variants using a lighter blue are common.

The Act respecting the flag and emblems of Québec states that "in all cases, the flag of Quebec has precedence over any other flag or emblem." Under federal protocol, the Canadian flag has precedence, but the National Flag of Canada etiquette recognize the Government of Quebec decree. The etiquette says:

It should also be noted that the Government of Quebec has decreed that on all buildings under its authority within the province of Quebec, whether it be those of government departments, boards, schools or others, as well as on city halls, the provincial flag of Quebec is given precedence over the National Flag of Canada and must occupy the place of honour. This does not apply to the Federal government’s properties in Quebec, where the National Flag of Canada retains precedence.

Article 2 of the Act respecting the flag and emblems of Québec confers the status of national emblem (French: emblème national) on the flag of Quebec.

=== Vertical display ===
Vertical display of the flag

The canton (canton d'honneur; top left quarter) must always be to the viewer's left.

== History ==
=== Early designs ===
The Union Jack (left) and the Canadian Red Ensign (right)

The desire of ethnic French Canadians for a distinctive flag was longstanding. Other flags that had been used included the Parti Patriote flag (a horizontal green, white and red tricolour, which became the flag of the Saint-Jean-Baptiste Society), as well as the French tricolour.

The direct predecessor of the modern Fleurdelisé was created by Elphège Filiatrault, a parish priest in Saint-Jude, Quebec. Called the Carillon, it resembles the modern flag except that the fleurs-de-lis are located at the corners, pointing inward. It was based on an earlier flag with no cross, and with the figure of the Virgin Mary in the centre.

The Carillon flag was first raised on September 26, 1902, and it is preserved in the archives of Saint-Hyacinthe, Quebec. Another version, with the Sacred Heart in the centre, also appeared, but it was left behind in the push for a new provincial flag after World War II. The Carillon flags were used informally.

Flag of the Parti patriote

The Carillon

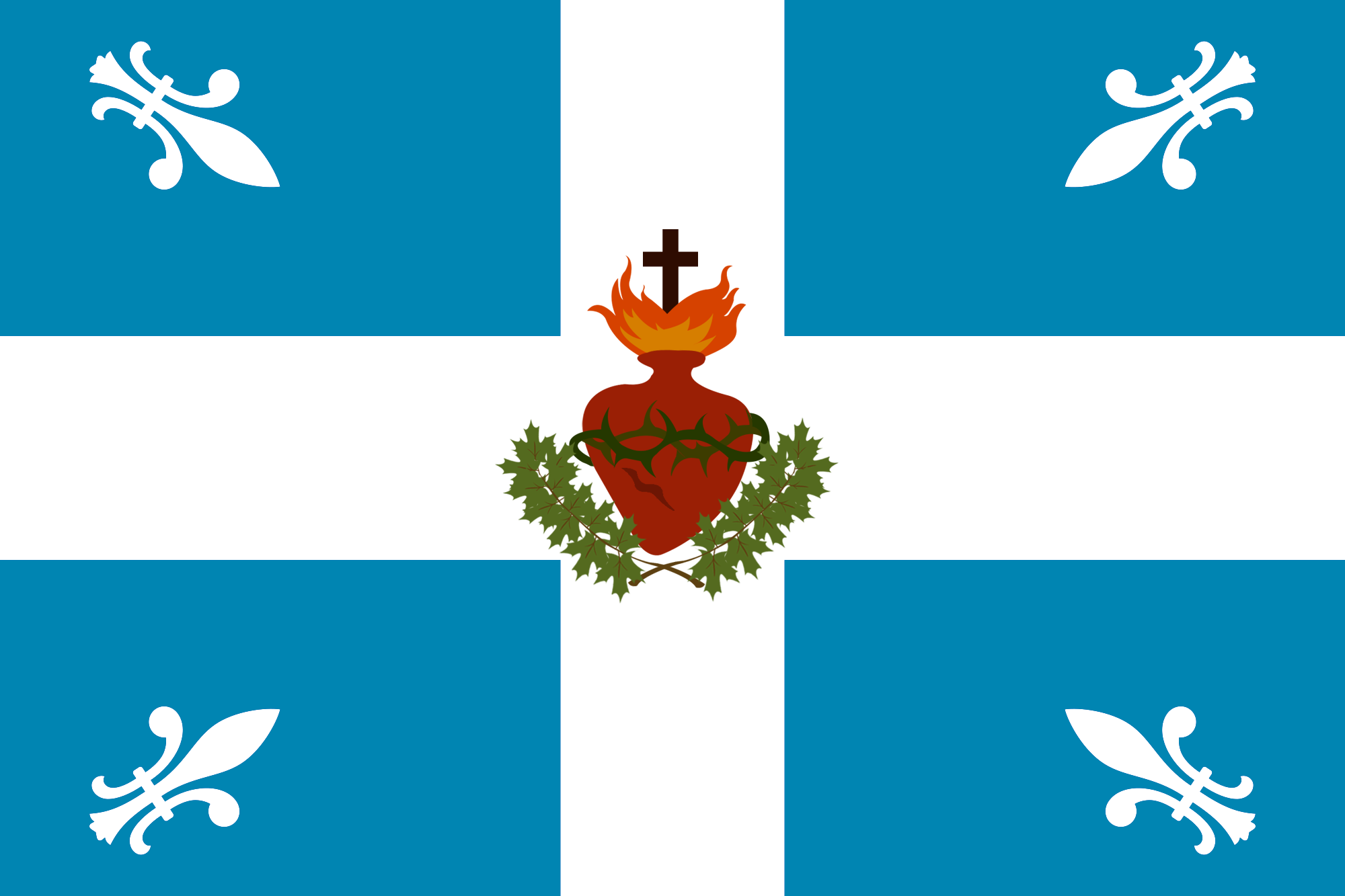
The Carillon Sacré-Cœur

On May 26, 1868, Queen Victoria approved Quebec's first coat of arms. A flag might have been devised by using the arms to deface a Blue Ensign or Red Ensign (a Union Flag in the canton, and the Quebec coat of arms in the fly). However, such ensigns were never used — various sources including the official Quebec government site mention that it was the Union Flag that flew over the Parliament Building until January 21, 1948, not a blue or red ensign. In addition, in 1938, at the opening of a mining school in Val-d'Or, the flag used to represent the Quebec government was a banner of arms. This was done at the behest of public servant Burroughs Pelletier, who had been told that the Ministry wanted a symbol but were unsure as to what should be used.

In 1947, an independent member of the Legislative Assembly, René Chaloult, demanded a new provincial flag to displace the unpopular (amongst some segment of the population of Quebec) Union Jack and Canadian Red Ensign. Various ideas were discussed between Chaloult, Lionel Groulx and Maurice Duplessis. One such idea involved incorporating a red maple leaf (later to be adopted for the flag of Canada). Burroughs Pelletier was also asked to present a few proposals to Duplessis, none of which were adopted. He was however consulted about what became the present design.

Burroughs Pelletier's 1948 flag proposals for Quebec
Proposal A

Proposal B

Proposal C1

Proposal C2

Proposal C3

Proposal D

Proposal E

=== Adoption of current flag ===
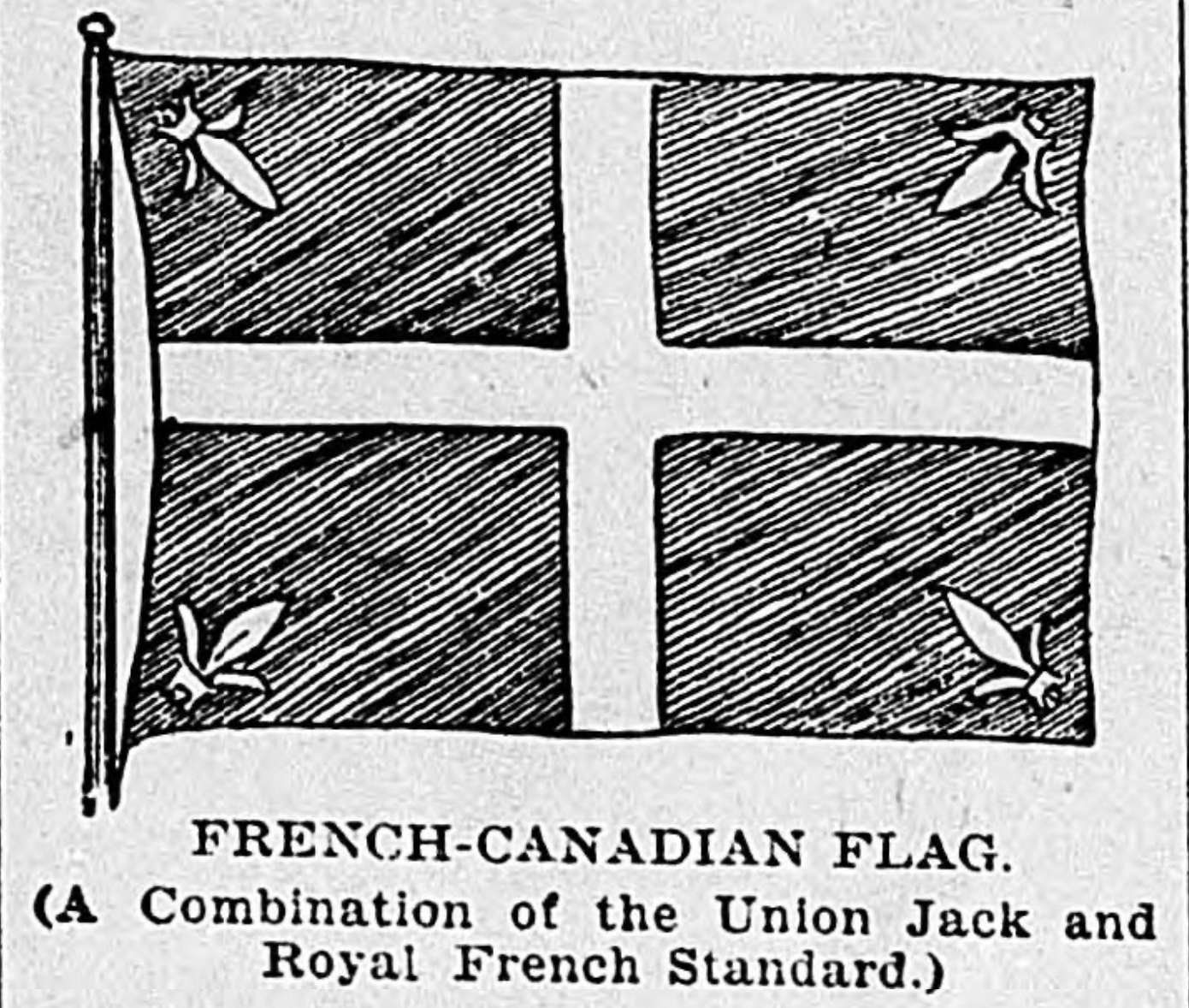
Proposed flag of French-Canadians, 1903

On January 21, 1948, the new flag was adopted and was flown over the Parliament Building that very afternoon. Apparently, it was the Carillon flag that flew that day, because the modern Fleurdelisé (with the fleurs-de-lis repositioned upright to their modern configuration in correspondence with the rules of heraldry) was not available until February 2.

The flag was adopted by order-in-council, and the news was presented to the Legislative Assembly more or less as a fait accompli. Opposition leader Adélard Godbout expressed his approval, as did Chaloult. A law governing the usage of the flag was later officially adopted by the Quebec Parliament on March 9, 1950. A more recent version of such a law was adopted in 2002.

A 2001 survey by the North American Vexillological Association ranked the Fleurdelisé as the best provincial or territorial flag, and the third-best of the flags of all U.S. and Canadian provinces, territories and states, behind the flags of New Mexico and Texas respectively. Likewise, the flag is highly popular in Quebec, and it is often seen displayed at many private residences and commercial buildings.

The flag of Quebec bears a close resemblance to both the French Châlons-en-Champagne city coat of arms and the Spanish Morcín municipality flag, which use similar (though unrelated) designs but with differing colours.

The coat of arms of Châlons-en-Champagne, France	The municipal flag of Morcín, Spain

The flag of Quebec was the basis for the jerseys of the Quebec Nordiques, which included the same shade of blue, the fleurs-de-lis and white stripes.

== See also ==
- Coat of arms of Quebec
- List of Canadian provincial and territorial symbols
- Symbols of Quebec
- Timeline of Quebec history
