= Coat of arms of Quebec =

Canadian provincial heraldic symbol

- Armiger: Government of Quebec
- Adopted: 1939; modified 2026 (de facto)
- Shield: Tierced in fess, Azure three fleurs-de-lis Or, Gules a lion passant guardant, and Or a sprig of three maple leaves Vert
- Motto: Je me souviens (French for 'I remember')
- Earlier version(s): Or on a Fess Gules between two Fleurs de Lis in chief Azure, and a sprig of three Leaves of Maple slipped Vert in base, a Lion passant guardant Or

The coat of arms of Quebec (armoiries du Québec) was adopted by an order-in-council of the Government of Quebec on 9 December 1939, replacing the arms assigned by royal warrant of Queen Victoria on 26 May 1868. On 23 January 2026, the Government of Quebec announced it was amending the coat of arms by removing the Tudor Crown as a crest.

== Symbolism ==
The shield is divided into three horizontal fields. When the arms were first granted, the Government of Quebec explained the symbolism as follows:

- Top – three gold fleurs-de-lis on a blue background, symbolizing royal France;
- Middle – a gold lion passant guardant on a red background, symbolizing the Kingdom of Great Britain;
- Bottom – three green maple leaves on a gold background, symbolizing Canada.

The shield is accompanied by a silver scroll bearing the province's motto, Je me souviens (French for 'I remember').

== Blazon ==
There are currently two alternative blazons with slightly different wording.

The blazon set out in Quebec law is:

Tiercé en fasce; d’azur, à trois fleurs-de-lis d’or; de gueules, à un léopard d’or, armé et lampassé d’azur; d’or, à une branche d’érable à sucre à triple feuille de sinople, aux nervures du champ. Timbré de la couronne royale. Sous l’écu, un listel d’argent bordé d’azur portant la devise « Je me souviens » du même.

The blazon set out in the federal Register of Arms, Flags and Badges of Canada:

Tiercé en fasce, d'azur à trois fleurs de lis d'or, de gueules au léopard d'or et d'or à une branchette d'érable à trois feuilles de sinople ; devise : « Je me souviens ».

Tierced in fess, Azure three fleurs-de-lis Or, Gules a lion passant guardant, and Or a sprig of three maple leaves Vert; Motto: Je me souviens.

== History ==
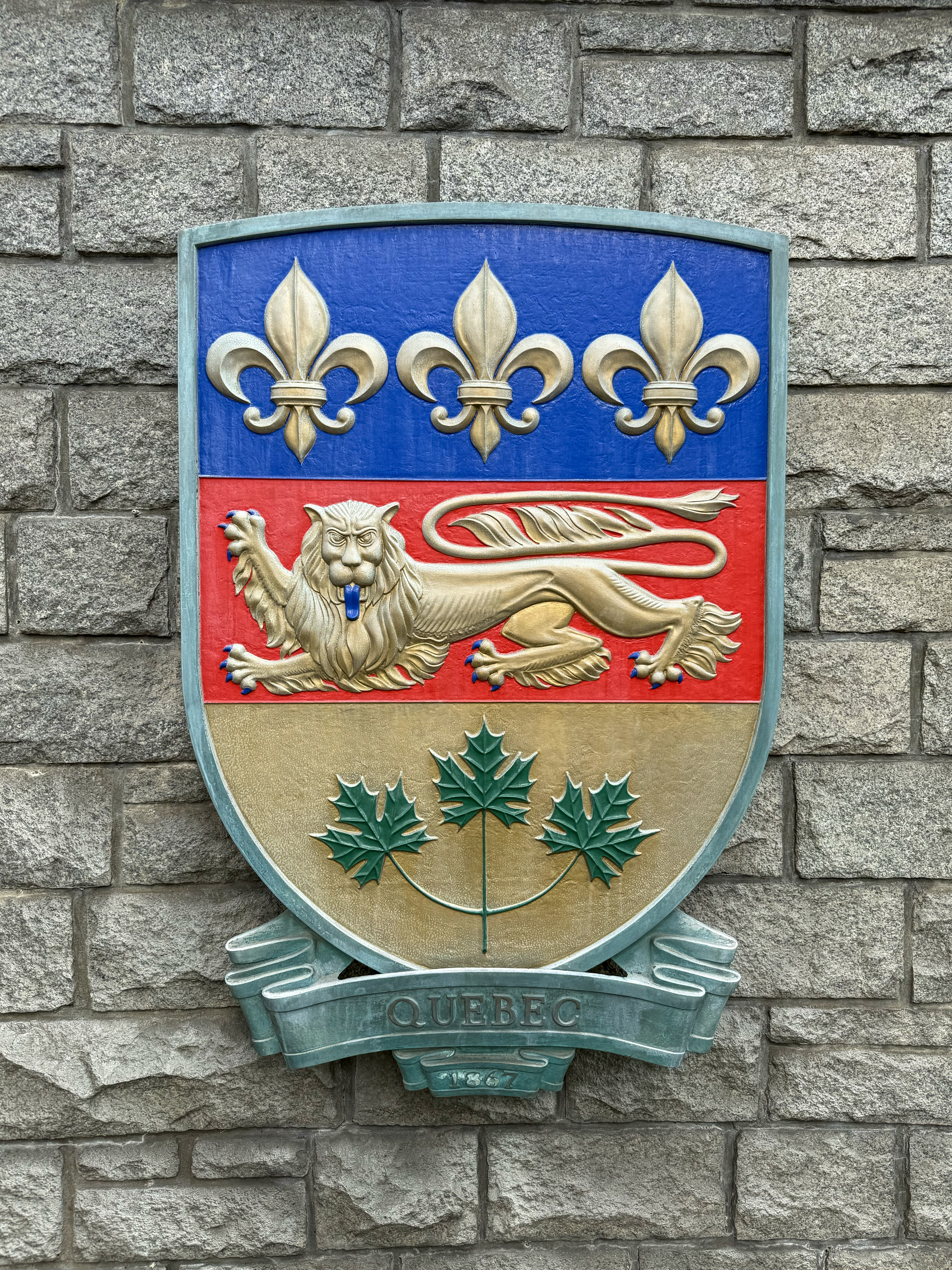
1939 arms of Quebec

Arms were first granted to the province in 1868 by Queen Victoria. They were blazoned as follows:

Or on a Fess Gules between two Fleurs de Lis in chief Azure, and a sprig of three Leaves of Maple slipped Vert in base, a Lion passant guardant Or.

The fleurs-de-lis were placed in the senior position on the shield but were only two in number and were blue on gold, as opposed to the three gold on blue fleurs-de-lis on the arms of the Kingdom of France. This was done as a tribute to the former French monarchy whilst avoiding any impression that the British monarch claimed the throne of France, a claim which had been dropped in 1801.

The designer of the Parliament Building of Quebec, Eugène-Étienne Taché, included the arms in the façade of the building. He added a motto, je me souviens, surrounded the shield with a wreath of maple leaves and ensigned it with the Imperial Crown. No alteration was made to the shield itself. Although the changes were made without a royal warrant, they were approved by a resolution of the provincial cabinet in 1883.

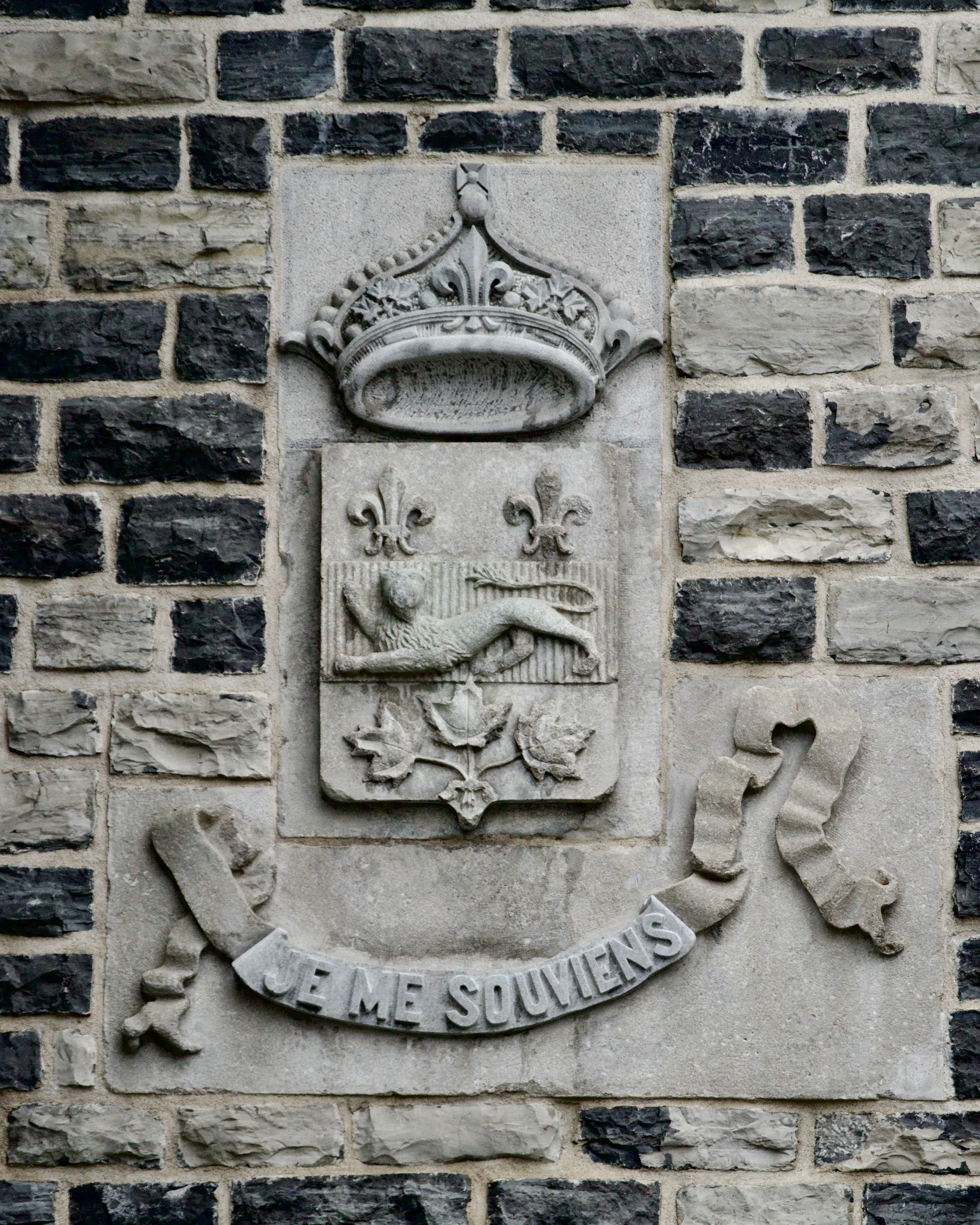
1868 design at Voltigeurs de Québec Armoury

In December 1939, the incoming provincial government led by Adélard Godbout made further changes to the arms with the assistance of Maurice Brodeur. The two blue fleurs-de-lis on a gold field were replaced by three gold fleurs-de-lis on a blue field. The wreath of maple leaves were removed from around the shield but the motto and crown were retained. These changes were again made without a royal warrant but by a provincial order-in-council.

In 1999, the Parliament of Quebec enacted a statute which declared that the coat of arms is the emblem of the state, established by the government, which can authorize its use. Quebec is the only Canadian province to have adopted arms by its own authority.

Some heraldic experts have argued that the provinces do not have a right to grant arms or to adapt arms granted by the Crown, so the 1883 and 1939 arms may be considered to have been unauthorized assumed arms. However, those sources were written before the enactment of the Act respecting the flag and emblems of Québec, which authorises the government to determine the arms of the province. Michael Jackson, former Chief of Protocol for Saskatchewan, took the position that the Crown in right of a province could exercise the royal prerogative of honours in matters within provincial jurisdiction, particularly if done by the authority of a statute.

On the issue of the use of the crown in the coat of arms, at the time some heraldists asserted that the royal crown could be properly used only by the federal authorities and not by the provinces. However, the heraldic consultant Alan Beddoe also made the counterargument that as the lieutenant-governor is the representative of the Crown in Quebec, the use of the heraldic crown in the provincial arms may not be improper. Jackson took the same position, more firmly than Beddoe.

On 23 January 2026, the Coalition Avenir Québec government announced the removal of the Tudor Crown from the official coat of arms of Quebec. The change was made by decree under the Act respecting the flag and emblems of Québec, which provides that the Government of Quebec establishes the province's coat of arms as the emblem of the state. The government stated that the measure was intended to reflect the political evolution of Quebec and to eliminate monarchical references and expressions associated with colonial legacies.

Justice Minister Simon Jolin-Barrette keeps saying on February 2026 that "the vast majority of Quebecers" had no attachment to the British monarchy and rejected it. The Crown Society of Canada criticized the decision, arguing that the crown represented a direct constitutional relationship between the monarch and Quebec that was distinct from the federal government. The change applies to official versions of the arms used by the Quebec government; existing representations on buildings and furniture of the National Assembly and the Quebec state were not to be altered for heritage-preservation reasons.

The Canadian Heraldic Authority's 2010 registration continues to describe the arms as having traditionally been shown ensigned by the Royal Crown. The federal government has used the 1939 variant, though the 1868 variant has been retained in some historical references, such as the Centennial Flame on Parliament Hill and the badge of the Royal 22^{e} Régiment.

== Chronology of the coat of arms of Quebec ==
1868–1883

1883–1939

1939–present (de jure)

2026–present (de facto)

Changes to the coat of arms of Quebec since granted in 1868

== Use of the coat of arms ==
The Act respecting the flag and emblems of Québec, passed by the Parliament of Quebec, provides that the coat of arms are the emblem of the state, established by the government, and that the government can authorise the use of the coat of arms.

Based on that provision, the Quebec government has enacted an order-in-council which regulates the use of the arms and the flag. Any person can use them in temporary decoration or advertising, provided that they are in good taste, only contain the name of the establishment, not suggest that the government of Quebec has approved the products, and not be used as a premium or sales incentive. The symbols can also appear in news media, movies and television, provided that they are not being used for publicity purposes.

== See also ==
- Symbols of Quebec
