= Outline of Quebec =

Province of Canada

Flag of Quebec

Coat of arms of Quebec

Location of Quebec

The following outline is provided as an overview of and topical guide to Quebec:

Quebec, a province in the eastern part of Canada, lies between Hudson Bay and the Gulf of St. Lawrence. It is the only Canadian province with a predominantly French-speaking population and the only one whose sole official language is French at the provincial level. Sovereignty plays a large role in the politics of Quebec, and the official opposition social-democratic Parti Québécois advocates national sovereignty for the province and secession from Canada. Sovereigntist governments held referendums on independence in 1980 and in 1995; voters rejected both proposals — the latter by a very narrow margin. In 2006 the House of Commons of Canada passed a symbolic motion recognizing the "Québécois as a nation within a united Canada."

== General reference ==
- Pronunciation: /kəˈbɛk/ or /kwɪˈbɛk/ (French: Québec [kebɛk])
- Common English name(s): Quebec
- Official English name(s): Quebec
- Nickname: "La Belle Province" (French for "The Beautiful Province")
- Common endonym(s):
- Official endonym(s):
- Adjectival(s): Quebec/Québécois
- Demonym(s): Quebecker/Quebecer/Québécois

== Geography of Quebec ==
Geography of Quebec

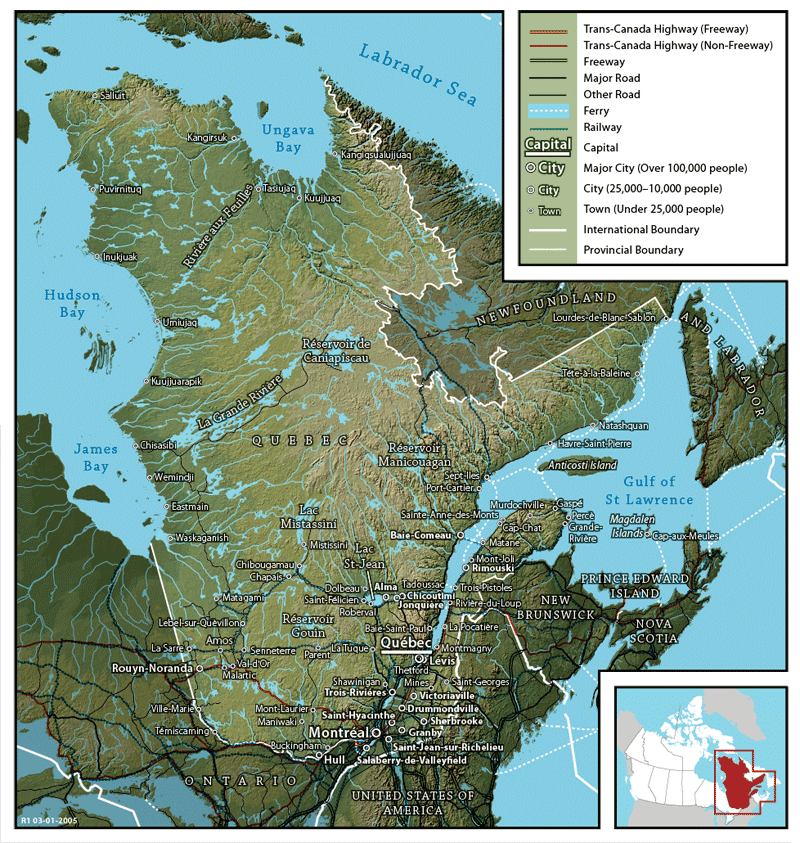
The Quebec territory.

- Quebec is: a province of Canada.
- Canada is: a country
- Population of Quebec: 7,970,672 (est.)
- Area of Quebec: 1,542,056 km^{2} (595,391 sq. miles)
  - List of Quebec area codes
- Atlas of Quebec

=== Location ===
- Quebec is situated within the following regions:
  - Northern Hemisphere, Western Hemisphere
    - Americas
      - North America
        - Northern America
          - Laurentia
            - Canada
              - Central Canada
              - Eastern Canada
                - Canadian Shield
- Time zones (see also Time in Canada):
  - Eastern Standard Time (UTC−05), Eastern Daylight Time (UTC−04) – includes most of the province
    - west of the Natashquan River
    - west of the 63°W longitude
  - Atlantic Standard Time (UTC−04), Atlantic Daylight Time (UTC−03)
    - east of the Natashquan River
    - east of the 63°W longitude
    - Magdalen Islands
- Extreme points of Quebec
- Landforms of Quebec

=== Environment of Quebec ===
Environment of Quebec

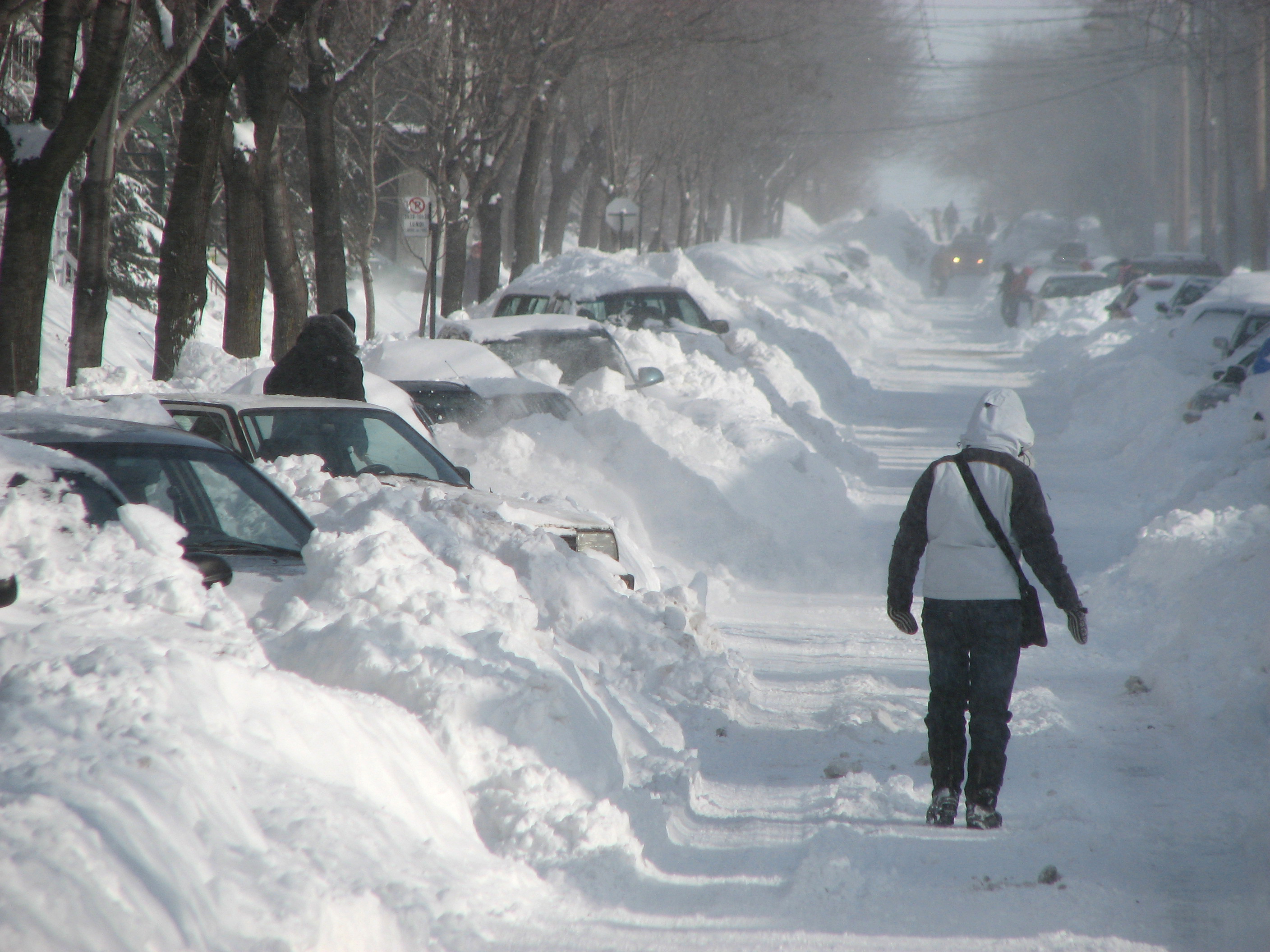
Quebec can be very warm during the summer and extremely snowy in the winter

- Climate of Quebec
- Ecology of Quebec
  - Ecoregions in Quebec
  - Renewable energy in Quebec
- Geology of Quebec
- Protected areas of Quebec
  - Biosphere reserves in Quebec
  - National parks in Quebec
- Wildlife of Quebec
  - Flora of Quebec
  - Fauna of Quebec
    - Birds of Quebec
    - Mammals of Quebec

==== Natural geographic features of Quebec ====
List of landforms of Quebec

- Fjords of Quebec
- Glaciers of Quebec
- Islands of Quebec
- Lakes of Quebec
  - Lake Mistassini
  - Lake Albanel
  - Lac Saint-Jean
  - Champlain Lake
  - Clearwater Lakes
  - Richmond Gulf (off.: lac Guillaume-Delisle)
  - Meech Lake
  - Lake Mégantic
  - Lake of Two Mountains
  - Lake Saint-Louis
- List of dams and reservoirs in Quebec
  - Caniapiscau Reservoir
  - Robert-Bourassa Reservoir
  - Pipmuacan Reservoir
  - Manicouagan Reservoir
  - Dozois Reservoir
  - Gouin Reservoir
- Rivers of Quebec
  - Saint Lawrence River
    - Chaudière River
    - Jacques-Cartier River
    - Manicouagan River
    - Ottawa River
    - Rivière aux Outardes
    - Rivière des Prairies
    - Richelieu River
    - Romaine River
    - Saguenay River
    - Saint-François River
    - Saint-Maurice River
  - Koksoak River
    - Caniapiscau River
  - La Grande River
    - Sakami River
    - Eastmain River
    - Rupert River
    - Laforge River
  - Great Whale River
  - Nottaway River
  - Broadback River
- Waterfalls of Quebec
- Mountains of Quebec
  - List of mountain ranges of Quebec
    - Laurentides
    - Appalaches
    - Monts Chic-Chocs
    - Collines Montérégiennes
    - Monts Torngat
  - Volcanoes in Quebec
- Valleys of Quebec

=== Heritage sites in Quebec ===
- World Heritage Sites in Quebec (2)
  - Miguasha National Park
  - Old Quebec
- National Historic Sites of Canada in Quebec
- Répertoire du patrimoine culturel du Québec

=== Regions of Quebec ===
Regions of Quebec

==== Ecoregions of Quebec ====
List of ecoregions in Quebec

- Ecoregions in Quebec
- Atlantic Maritime Ecozone (CEC)
- Mixedwood Plains Ecozone (CEC)
- Northern Arctic Ecozone (CEC)
- Northwest Atlantic Marine Ecozone (CEC)
- Southern Arctic Ecozone (CEC)
- Taiga Shield Ecozone (CEC)

==== Administrative divisions of Quebec ====
Administrative divisions of Quebec

===== Regions of Quebec =====
Regions of Quebec

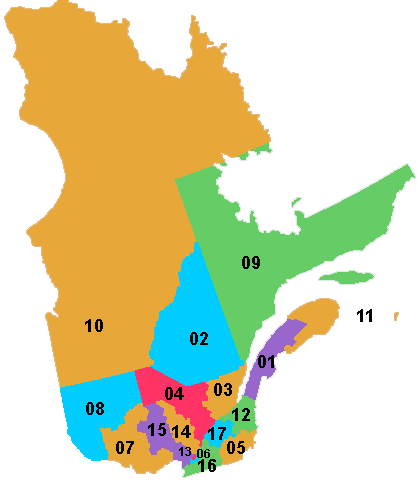
The seventeen administrative regions of Quebec.

1. Bas-Saint-Laurent
2. Saguenay–Lac-Saint-Jean
3. Capitale-Nationale
4. Mauricie
5. Estrie
6. Montreal
7. Outaouais
8. Abitibi-Témiscamingue
9. Côte-Nord
10. Nord-du-Québec
11. Gaspésie–Îles-de-la-Madeleine
12. Chaudière-Appalaches
13. Laval
14. Lanaudière
15. Laurentides
16. Montérégie
17. Centre-du-Québec

===== Indian reserves in Quebec =====
- List of Indian reserves in Quebec

===== Municipalities of Quebec =====
List of municipalities in Quebec

- List of former municipalities in Quebec
- Population centres in Quebec
  - Quebec City – Windsor Corridor
- Municipal reorganization in Quebec
- Types of municipalities in Quebec
- Metropolitan communities in Quebec
  - Communauté métropolitaine de Montréal
  - Communauté métropolitaine de Québec
- Municipalities by type
  - Cities of Quebec
    - Urban agglomerations of Quebec
    - Capital of Quebec: Quebec City – the only city in North America with extant city walls.
      - Geography of Quebec City
        - Upper town located on the Cap-Diamant
        - Climate of Quebec City
        - Demographics of Quebec City
      - Architecture of Quebec City
        - List of historic buildings in Quebec City
        - List of tallest buildings in Quebec City
      - Boroughs of Quebec City
      - List of hospitals in Quebec City
      - List of events in Quebec City
      - History of Quebec City
        - List of mayors of Quebec City
        - Timeline of Quebec City history
      - Transport in Quebec City
      - Name of Quebec City
      - List of people from Quebec City
      - Ramparts of Quebec City
      - Symbols of Quebec City
        - Coat of arms of Quebec City
        - Flag of Quebec City
    - Montreal
      - Geography of Montreal
        - Located on the Island of Montreal
        - Climate of Montreal
        - Demographics of Montreal
        - Places in Montreal
          - Areas of Montreal
            - Boroughs of Montreal
            - List of neighbourhoods in Montreal
          - List of public art in Montreal
          - List of hospitals in Montreal
          - Landmarks of Montreal
          - List of parks in Montreal
            - List of baseball parks in Montreal
        - Urban agglomeration of Montreal
      - Culture of Montreal
        - Architecture of Montreal
          - List of oldest buildings and structures in Montreal
          - List of tallest buildings in Montreal
        - List of people from Montreal
        - Symbols of Montreal
          - Coat of arms of Montreal
          - Flag of Montreal
      - Economy of Montreal
      - History of Montreal
        - Timeline of Montreal history
        - Name of Montreal
        - Reorganization of Montreal
      - Mayor of Montreal
        - Past Mayors
      - Politics of Montreal
        - Municipal government of Montreal
        - Proposal for the Province of Montreal
      - Transport in Montreal
        - List of airports in the Montreal area
        - List of Montreal bus routes
        - List of Montreal Metro stations
        - Port of Montreal
      - List of roads in Montreal
  - List of township municipalities in Quebec
  - List of united township municipalities in Quebec
  - Communauté métropolitaine de Québec
  - List of communities in Quebec
    - List of Anglo-Quebecer communities
  - List of parish municipalities in Quebec
  - List of regional county municipalities and equivalent territories in Quebec
  - List of village municipalities in Quebec
- List of boroughs in Quebec

=== Demography of Quebec ===
Demographics of Quebec

- Demographic history of Quebec
- Language demographics of Quebec
- List of Anglo-Quebecer communities

==== Population distribution by religion ====
Province	Christians	Non-religious	Muslims	Jews	Buddhists	Hindus	Sikhs
Quebec	6,432,430	413,190	108,620	89,915	41,380	24,525	8,225

== Government and politics of Quebec ==
Politics of Quebec

- Form of government:
- Capital of Quebec: Quebec City
- Anti-Quebec sentiment
- Elections in Quebec (last 5)
  - 2014 Quebec general election
  - 2012 Quebec general election
  - 2008 Quebec general election
  - 2007 Quebec general election
  - 2003 Quebec general election
- Quebec autonomism
- Quebec federalist ideology
- Quebec nationalism
- Quebec sovereignty movement
  - List of subjects related to the Quebec independence movement
  - Act Respecting the Future of Quebec
  - History of the Quebec sovereignty movement
  - Québécois nation motion
  - Reference re Secession of Quebec
  - Partition of Quebec
- Political parties in Quebec
- Political scandals of Quebec
- Taxation in Quebec

=== Branches of the government of Quebec ===
Government of Quebec

==== Executive branch of the government of Quebec ====
- Head of state: King in Right of Quebec, King of Canada, King Charles III
  - Head of state's representative (Viceroy): Lieutenant Governor of Quebec, Manon Jeannotte
    - Previous lieutenant governors
    - Head of government: Premier of Quebec, Christine Fréchette
      - Previous premiers
      - Deputy Premier of Quebec
        - Previous Deputy Premiers
      - Cabinet: Executive Council of Quebec
        - Head of council: Lieutenant Governor in Council, as representative of the King in Right of Quebec
        - Leader of the government in parliament
      - Departments of the Quebec Government
        - Secrétariat aux affaires intergouvernementales canadiennes (Ministry of Intergovernmental Affairs)
        - Secrétariat aux affaires autochtones (Ministry of Aboriginal Affairs)
        - Ministry of Agriculture, Fisheries and Food
        - Ministry of Municipal Affairs, Regions and Land Occupancy
        - Ministry of Culture and Communications
        - Ministry of Economic Development, Innovation and Export Trade
        - Ministry of Education, Recreation and Sports
        - Finances Québec
        - Revenu Québec
        - Ministère des Services gouvernementaux (Ministry of Government Services)
        - Secrétariat du Conseil du trésor (Treasury Board)
        - Ministry of Health and Social Services
        - Ministry of Immigration and Cultural Communities
        - Ministry of International Relations
        - Ministry of Justice
        - Ministry of Labour
        - Ministry of Native Affairs
        - Ministry of Natural Resources and Wildlife
        - Ministry of Public Security
        - Ministry of Seniors' Affairs
        - Ministry of Sustainable Development, Environment and Parks
        - Ministry of Tourism
        - Transports Québec (Ministry of Transport)
        - Ministry of Youth Protection and Rehabilitation

==== Legislative branch of the government of Quebec ====
- Parliament of Quebec (unicameral): National Assembly of Quebec
  - President of the National Assembly of Quebec: Yvon Vallières
  - Parliament Building
- Federal representation
  - Quebec lieutenant
  - List of Quebec senators

==== Judicial branch of the government of Quebec ====
- Federal Courts of Canada
  - Supreme Court of Canada
  - Federal Court of Appeal
  - Tax Court of Canada
- Canadian court of appeal: Quebec Court of Appeal
- Superior court: Quebec Superior Court
- Provincial Court: Court of Quebec
  - The Civil Division
  - The Criminal and Penal Division
  - The Youth Division
- Military court: Court Martial Appeal Court of Canada

=== International relations of Quebec ===
- Ministry of International Relations
- Quebec Government Offices

=== Law and order in Quebec ===
Law of Quebec

- Bar of Quebec – the provincial law society for lawyer s in Quebec (officially known by its French designation: Barreau du Québec)
- Capital punishment in Quebec: none.
  - Quebec, as with all of Canada, does not have capital punishment.
  - Canada eliminated the death penalty for murder on July 14, 1976.
- Civil Code of Quebec – composed of ten books:
  1. Persons
  2. The Family
  3. Successions
  4. Property
  5. Obligations
  6. Prior Claims and Hypothecs
  7. Evidence
  8. Prescription
  9. Publication of Rights
  10. Private International Law
- Constitution of Quebec
- Criminal justice system of Quebec
- Crime in Quebec
  - Organized crime in Quebec
- Human rights in Quebec
  - Quebec Charter of Human Rights and Freedoms
  - Charter of the French Language
  - Civil unions in Quebec
  - High Arctic relocation (human rights violation)
  - Legal dispute over Quebec's language policy
  - LGBT rights in Quebec
    - Same-sex marriage in Quebec
- Law enforcement in Quebec
- Penal system of Quebec

=== Military of Quebec ===
Canadian Forces Being a part of Canada, Quebec does not have its own military. The Canadian forces stationed within Quebec are detailed below:

==== Land forces in Quebec ====
- Land Forces in Quebec
  - Regular Forces
    - Infantry Regiment (HQ based in Quebec City)
      - 1st Battalion, Royal 22nd Regiment Mechanized Infantry (based in Canadian Forces Base Valcartier)
      - 2nd Battalion, Royal 22nd Regiment Mechanized Infantry (based in Quebec City)
      - 3rd Battalion, Royal 22nd Regiment Light infantry (based in CFB Valcartier)
    - Armoured Regiment (based in CFB Valcartier)
    - Mechanized Brigade Group (based in CFB Valcartier)
    - Headquarters & Signal Squadron : 5 CMBG Headquarters & Signal Squadron (based in CFB Valcartier)
    - Artillery : 5^{e} Régiment d'artillerie légère du Canada (based in CFB Valcartier)
    - Engineer Regiment (based in CFB Valcartier)
    - Military Research (based in CFB Valcartier)
    - 5 Area Construction Troop, 4 Engineer Support Regiment (based in Courcelette - QC)
  - Regular Forces Support Group
    - 5 Area Support Group5 Area Support Group (based in Canadian Forces Base Montreal)
    - 5 Service Battalion (based in CFB Valcartier)
    - 5 Area Support Group Signal Squadron (based in CFB Montreal)
    - CFB/ASU Unit Montreal (based in CFB Montreal)
    - CFB/ASU Valcartier (based in CFB Valcartier)
    - ASU Saint-Jean Richelain
    - 5 Military Police Unit (based in CFB Montreal)
    - 5 Military Police Platoon (based in CFB Valcartier)
    - 5 Field Ambulance (based in CFB Valcartier)
  - Reserve
    - 34^{e} Groupe-Brigade du Canada (Reserve) (entirely based in CFB Montreal) which includes:
      - Royal Canadian Hussars (Montreal) (Reserve) (Armoured - Cougar)
      - The Canadian Grenadier Guards (Reserve) (Light Infantry)
      - The Black Watch (Royal Highland Regiment) of Canada (Reserve) (Light Infantry)
      - The Royal Montreal Regiment (Reserve) (Light Infantry)
      - Le Régiment de Maisonneuve (Reserve) (Light Infantry)
      - Les Fusiliers Mont-Royal (Reserve) (Light Infantry)
    - 35 Canadian Brigade Group Headquarters (Quebec City)
    - Sherbrooke Hussars, Reconnaissance (Sherbrooke)
    - 12^{e} Régiment blindé du Canada (Milice), Reconnaissance (Trois-Rivières)
    - Le Régiment de la Chaudière, Light Infantry (Lévis)
    - Le Régiment du Saguenay, Light Infantry (Chicoutimi)
    - Les Fusiliers de Sherbrooke, Light Infantry (Sherbrooke)
    - Les Fusiliers du S^{t}-Laurent, Light Infantry (Rimouski)
    - Les Voltigeurs de Québec, Light Infantry (Quebec City)
    - 6^{e} Régiment d'artillerie de campagne, ARC Artillery (Lévis)
    - 62^{e} Régiment d'artillerie de campagne, ARC Artillery (Shawinigan)
    - 35 Combat Engineer Regiment, Engineer (Quebec City)
    - 35 (Quebec) Service Battalion, Service and Support (Quebec City)

==== Air forces in Quebec ====
- Air Forces in Quebec
  - Regular Forces
    - 403 Helicopter Operational Training Squadron (based in Canadian Forces Base Valcartier)
    - 425 Tactical Fighter Squadron (based in Canadian Forces Base Bagotville)
    - 439 Combat Support Squadron (based in Canadian Forces Base Bagotville)

==== Naval forces in Quebec ====
- Naval Forces in Quebec at the Naval Reserve Headquarters (NAVRESHQ)

=== Local government in Quebec ===
Local government in Quebec

== History of Quebec ==
=== History of Quebec, by period ===
- Hochelaga (village)
- New France
- Articles of Capitulation of Quebec
- Articles of Capitulation of Montreal
- French and Indian War
- Province of Quebec (1763–1791)
  - Invasion of Canada (1775)
- Lower Canada
  - Rebellions of 1837
- Canada East
  - Burning of the Parliament Buildings in Montreal
- Quebec during World War II
  - See Military history of Canada during World War II
  - Quebec Conference, 1943
  - Conscription Crisis of 1944
  - Second Quebec Conference
- Quiet Revolution (1960s)
- Expo 67
- Front de libération du Québec
  - October Crisis (1970)
- 1980 Quebec referendum
- Meech Lake Accord (1987)
- Oka Crisis (1990)
- 1995 Quebec referendum
  - Unity Rally (1995)
- North American ice storm of 1998
- Quebec Biker war

=== History of Quebec, by region ===
- History of Montreal
  - Timeline of Montreal history
- History of Quebec City
  - Timeline of Quebec City history

=== History of Quebec, by subject ===
- 20th-century municipal history of Quebec
- 21st-century municipal history of Quebec
- Demographic history of Quebec
- Economic history of Quebec
- History of Quebec French
- History of the Quebec sovereignty movement
- Pre-20th-century municipal history of Quebec

== Culture of Quebec ==
Culture of Quebec

- Architecture of Quebec
  - Architecture of Quebec City
    - Citadelle of Quebec
    - Habitat 67
  - List of Quebec architects
- Cuisine of Quebec
  - Quebec beer
    - List of breweries in Quebec
  - Quebec wine
- Provincial decorations and medals (in order of precedence)
  - Grand Officer of the National Order of Quebec
  - Officer of the National Order of Quebec
  - Knight of the National Order of Quebec
- Festivals in Quebec
  - Montreal International Jazz Festival
  - Festival d'été de Québec
  - Quebec Winter Carnival
  - Montreal World Film Festival
- Humour in Quebec
  - Just for Laughs
  - List of Quebec comedians
- Language demographics of Quebec (see also: language section in Quebec article)
  - Quebec English
  - Quebec French
    - History of Quebec French
    - Quebec French lexicon
    - Quebec French phonology
    - Quebec French profanity
    - Quebec French syntax
- Media in Quebec
- Museums in Quebec
- Order of precedence in Quebec
- Prostitution in Quebec
- Public holidays in Quebec
- Records of Quebec
- Regional culture in Quebec (culture by region)
  - Culture of Montreal
- Scouting and Guiding in Quebec

=== Art in Quebec ===
- Art in Quebec
  - Quebec comics
- Cinema of Quebec
  - List of Quebec actors
  - List of Quebec film directors
  - List of Quebec films
- Comedy of Quebec
  - List of Quebec comedians
- Dance of Quebec
- Literature of Quebec
  - Quebec comics
  - List of Quebec writers
- Music of Quebec
  - List of musicians from Quebec
  - List of Quebec record labels
- Television in Quebec
  - List of Quebec television series
- Theatre in Quebec
  - List of Quebec actors
  - Grand Théâtre de Québec

=== People of Quebec ===
- Quebec diaspora
- Ethnicities in Quebec
  - Aboriginal peoples in Quebec
  - English Canadian
    - English-speaking Quebecer
  - French Canadian
    - French-speaking Quebecer
  - Irish Quebecers
  - Scots-Quebecers
- List of Quebecers
  - List of English-speaking Quebecers
  - Lists of people from Quebec by region

=== Religion in Quebec ===
Religion in Quebec

- Buddhism in Quebec
- Christianity in Quebec
  - Anglicanism in Quebec
    - Anglican Diocese of Quebec
  - Roman Catholicism in Quebec
    - Roman Catholic Archdiocese of Quebec
      - Chicoutimi
      - Sainte-Anne-de-la-Pocatière
      - Trois Rivières
    - Roman Catholic Archdiocese of Montréal
      - Roman Catholic Diocese of Joliette
      - Roman Catholic Diocese of Saint-Jean-Longueuil
      - Roman Catholic Diocese of Saint-Jérôme
      - Roman Catholic Diocese of Valleyfield
    - Ursulines of Quebec
- Hinduism in Quebec
- Islam in Quebec
- Judaism in Quebec
- Sikhism in Quebec
- Irreligion in Quebec

=== Sports in Quebec ===
- Curling in Quebec
  - List of curling clubs in Quebec
- Baseball in Quebec
  - Québec Capitales (Canadian-American Association of Professional Baseball)
- Football in Quebec
  - Montreal Alouettes (Canadian Football League)
  - CF Montreal (Major League Soccer)
- Ice Hockey in Quebec
  - List of ice hockey teams in Quebec
    - Montreal Canadiens (National Hockey League)
    - Quebec Remparts (Minor Hockey League)
- Rugby Quebec
- Major sporting events
  - 1976 Summer Olympics
  - Canadian Grand Prix

==== Quebec Athletes ====
Notable Quebec athletes include:

- Baseball : Éric Gagné, Russell Martin, Dick Lines
- Basketball : Bill Wennington, Samuel Dalembert, Joel Anthony
- Cycling : Geneviève Jeanson, Lyne Bessette
- Diving : Alexandre Despatie, Sylvie Bernier, Annie Pelletier
- Figure skating : Joannie Rochette, Isabelle Brasseur, David Pelletier, Josée Chouinard, Valérie Marcoux
- Hockey : Maurice Richard, Guy Lafleur, Mario Lemieux, Mike Bossy, Jean Béliveau, Patrick Roy, Martin Brodeur, Vincent Lecavalier, Doug Harvey, Roberto Luongo, Joe Malone
- Judo :
- Taekwondo : Trần Triệu Quân
- Mixed martial arts : Georges "Rush" S^{t}-Pierre
- Short-track speed skating : Marc Gagnon, Nathalie Lambert, Éric Bédard
- Long track speed skating : Gaétan Boucher
- Racing : Gilles Villeneuve, Jacques Villeneuve, Alex Tagliani, Patrick Carpentier
- Football : Paul Lambert, Éric Lapointe, Terry Evanshen, Ian Beckles
- Soccer : Nick DeSantis, Sandro Grande, Adam Braz, Patrick Leduc

=== Symbols of Quebec ===
Symbols of Quebec

- Coat of arms of Quebec
- Flag of Quebec
- National anthem of Quebec (unofficial): Gens du pays
- Provincial flower: blue flag iris
- Provincial bird: snowy owl
- Provincial tree: yellow birch
- Provincial motto: Je me souviens (I remember)
- Provincial symbol: Fleur-de-lis
- Provincial capital: Quebec City

== Economy and infrastructure of Quebec ==
Economy of Quebec

- Economic rank (by nominal GDP) - This ranking shows only the Rank of Canada, the country in which is located Quebec
- Agriculture in Quebec
  - List of breweries in Quebec
- Banking in Quebec
  - Desjardins Group
  - National Bank of Canada
  - Laurentian Bank of Canada
  - Royal Bank of Canada
  - Bank of Montreal
  - CIBC
- Communications in Quebec
  - Internet in Quebec
  - Radio stations in Quebec
  - Television in Quebec
    - Television stations in Quebec
    - TVA (Canadian TV network)
    - V (TV network)
    - Ici Radio-Canada Télé
    - Télé-Québec
- Companies of Quebec
- Currency of Quebec - Quebec is a province and therefore shares its currency with the country in which it is located, Canada.
- Economic history of Quebec
- Energy in Quebec
  - Environmental and energy policy of Quebec
  - Oil industry in Quebec
  - Electricity sector in Quebec
    - Electrical generating stations in Quebec
      - Hydroelectric generating stations in Quebec
      - Wind farms in Quebec
      - Biomass generating stations in Quebec
      - Nuclear generating stations in Quebec
      - Fossil fuel generating stations in Quebec
      - Generating stations serving loads not connected to the main North American power grid in Quebec
    - Hydro-Québec
      - Hydro-Québec's electricity transmission system
      - James Bay Project
- Health care in Quebec
  - List of hospitals in Quebec
- Mining in Quebec
- Montreal Stock Exchange
- Tourism in Quebec
- Transport in Quebec
  - Air transport in Quebec
    - Airlines of Quebec
    - Airports in Quebec
  - Rail transport in Quebec
    - Railways in Quebec
  - Roads in Quebec
    - Autoroutes of Quebec
  - Vehicle registration plates of Quebec
- Water supply and sanitation in Quebec

== Education in Quebec ==
Education in Quebec The Quebec education system is unique in North America in that it has 4 education levels: grade school, high school, college, university.

- Primary education in Quebec
  - School districts in Quebec
  - English educational institutions in Quebec
  - Grade school in Quebec
  - High school in Quebec
- Higher education in Quebec
  - College education in Quebec
    - Public colleges in Quebec
    - Private subsidized colleges in Quebec
    - Private colleges under licence in Quebec
    - Government colleges in Quebec
    - Art schools in Quebec
  - Universities in Quebec
    - Francophone universities
      - Université Laval
      - Université de Montréal and its affiliated schools
        - École Polytechnique de Montréal
        - HEC Montréal
      - Université de Sherbrooke
      - Université du Québec
        - École nationale d'administration publique
        - Institut national de la recherche scientifique
        - École de technologie supérieure
        - Université du Québec à Chicoutimi
        - Université du Québec à Montréal
        - Université du Québec à Rimouski
        - Université du Québec à Trois-Rivières
        - Université du Québec en Abitibi-Témiscamingue
        - Université du Québec en Outaouais
    - Anglophone universities
      - Bishop's University
      - Concordia University
      - McGill University

== See also ==
- Index of Quebec-related articles
- Outline of geography
  - Outline of North America
    - Outline of Canada
      - Outline of Alberta
      - Outline of British Columbia
      - Outline of Manitoba
      - Outline of Nova Scotia
      - Outline of Ontario
      - Outline of Prince Edward Island
      - Outline of Saskatchewan
