= Electoral geography =

Geography of elections

Electoral geography is the analysis of the methods, the behavior, and the results of elections in the context of geographic space and using geographical techniques. Specifically, it is an examination of the dual interaction in which geographical facts affect the political decisions, and the geographical structure of the election system affects electoral results. The purpose of the analysis is to identify and understand driving factors and the electoral characteristics of territories in a broad and integrative manner.

== Elections ==
Elections serve as the central political expression and exercise of power within democratic states, and conducting elections in democracies requires the translation of the political decisions of the distributed voting public into resulting “seat” representation of the various constituencies, except in the cases of Israel and the Netherlands which each have only a single constituency. It is philosophically accepted that in a democracy, each vote is equally valid amongst all other votes and thus each eligible voter casts only one equally valued vote. However, disproportionality and bias towards specific voting groups arise in the construction of artificial constituency boundaries in that political parties and policies are unevenly and inaccurately represented in the aggregate results amongst the electoral regions when compared to the popular vote.

=== Electoral constituencies ===
The territorial unit with boundary distinctions in representative elections is commonly termed the constituency, district, or precinct, and serves as both a region for the tabulation and study of the electoral result. These boundaries are defined in various methods, which are unique to each state, and can cause alterations or skewing of aggregate vote results and by extension the true decision of the electorate.

=== Election mechanics ===
Electoral geographers require the knowledge of the local and statewide laws and procedures for conducting elections, though it has been claimed that it is not within their purview to attempt to correct any observed flaws. The details of voting or the parameters of the election in various states or in constituencies within the state are critical factors, which affect the levels of participation and can characterize the outcome. The mechanics of an election are fully described through identifying the pattern of constituencies, franchise qualifications and changes, and the method of the election. The patterning of constituencies is related to the spatial orientation and drawing of boundaries as detailed previously. The franchise qualifications define the eligible voter bloc, the electorate, and thus determine the range of relevant, critical issues, which apply to those who vote in an election, and alterations in enfranchisement can greatly alter the nature of the electorate and the outcome of the election. The methods of election are critical to analyzing the results, as it is impossible to adequately assess the proportionality of representation or validity of an electoral outcome without understanding how votes are cast and counted. For example, single-vote, winner take all systems can greatly disenfranchise minority voters as their selection is ultimately irrelevant in a two-party dominant system. However, in systems which employ proportional voting or ranked voting techniques, the extreme minorities receive greater opportunity for representation.

== Electoral distortion and bias ==
Regardless of the means by which boundaries are drawn, including by non-partisan or independent governmental associations, bias in electoral regions can always be observed. The United Kingdom serves as an example as the constituencies are established by a non-partisan commission and yet bias toward Labour has been observed in general elections since 1979.

=== Gerrymandering ===
Gerrymandering is a selective drawing of constituency boundaries in order to alter the results of an election. The popular or numerical election results within a constituency, precinct, or electoral district can be distorted by the act of gerrymandering. Common alterations to election results caused by gerrymandering are:

- Splitting or dilution of the concentrations of votes for one party so as to make that party the minority in a large portion of the constituencies in conjunction
- Concentrating the votes of one party into a selected few constituencies such that many of their votes are ‘wasted’, while creating many constituencies with only slight majorities in favor of the other party
- Placing two or more incumbents of one party within a single revised constituency, thus removing control of seats for that party
- Creating "winner takes all" multi-member districts with one party in the majority

=== Malapportionment ===
Malapportionment is unequal and disproportionate representation electoral systems with multiple constituencies. It is a violation of the democratic principle of “one person, one vote” in that constituency boundaries enclose populations of various size, which means that the votes of people in regions of lower population have greater representation per vote than those in regions with a higher population. The effect of malapportionment is observed when equivalent percentages of the total vote results in different numbers of seats for each party due to one party having greater control in smaller constituencies and another in larger constituencies.

== Geographic context ==
The spatial distribution and variation of the voting populace in conjunction with the demographic characteristics and delineation of voting regions provide a geographic context for the analysis of elections. Along with purely physical characteristics, distribution of economic resources, lines of communication, governmental and party platforms, and gender, ethnic, or class groups creates an interwoven fabric of people and opinion, which is accounted for in electoral analysis. A population settles for various social, economic, and cultural reasons which create a defined contour of both population density and related political opinion. However, this contour is not a static condition and changes in electoral results must be considered with respect to the change in the type of people and not just the change in their chosen politics. The distribution of politics has been attributed to various factors, one of which is described as a convergence of external stimuli. These stimuli can come in the form of state-supplied information, local cultural norms, religious affiliations, economic opportunity, and media presentation of issues. The degree of effect for each particular stimulus is then a result of the susceptibility of a particular geography. For example, policy dealing with the governmental treatment of an urban population would have greater importance to those in a territory with an urban densities and a far smaller importance in a sparser region. A state or its political organizations has some power to affect these stimuli and are therefore considered as a contributing factor in the changes of election outcomes.

=== Physical contour ===
Electoral geography considers the way in which the physical characteristics of a territory directly affect the population and thus the election decision of these people. The geographic location and associated natural factors are directly related to the potential in a specific region for political development and have an additional relationship with the electoral processes and policy decisions of the region. The study of electoral results has been shown to identify the regions of specific politics and the relative cohesion amongst these similar regions. Regions which share large numbers of physical or demographic characteristics, or both as these two factors are related, will demonstrate significant similarities in voting participation and patterns of outcome.

=== Economics, communications, and infrastructure ===
The economic development within a given region is also related to the development of its politics and the issues which are important to the electorate. A state with disproportionate economic development will necessarily come under pressure from the poorer constituencies to take action to redistribute wealth and level the economic prosperity, which will be observable in the electoral results. The range and availability of communication and issue awareness can affect perception of issues and skew rational decision making. If a populace is generally unaware of the implications of policy decisions they are less able to make informed decisions and are more readily manipulated by candidate or party claims and marketing techniques, which can make analysis difficult as no predictable rationale may exist for voting outcomes.

=== Culture, demographics, and political parties ===
Background information detailing the established political parties, issues being contested in an election, and the mechanics of the election process also help to contextualize and understanding contributing factors in each individual election. Over time these factors may be changed as parties are formed or disbanded and policy issues are brought to vote or become obsolete, which can explain the shifting appearance of the electoral result over a period of time. The governmental and party platforms serve as categories into which voters are forced to classify themselves even though it is likely that no one party platform accurately captures the entirety of the opinions held by a voter. This makes consideration of the party platform or recent party activities critical in understanding the changes or stability of electoral results over space and time. Gender, ethnic, and class disparity can cause voting that is related to shared background qualities and experience as opposed to political opinions. This means that candidates from a particular area or common ethnicity can receive votes from the citizens of that area irrespective of their party affiliations or national because of their shared experience and mutual acquaintance. This has been referred to as the “friends and neighbors effect”.

=== Determinism ===
There is a distinction amongst geographers between considering the effect of geography to be fully deterministic and merely having only a partial effect amongst other effects. Deterministic electoral geography would result in predictable results regardless of candidate or proposed policy as the sum of physical geographic traits would entirely control voting decisions. This interpretation has been widely rejected by geographers. Instead, it is more fully accepted that geography plays some role in conjunction with other cultural and interpersonal effects. The “neighborhood effect” is an observed altering of electoral results due to the tendency of people who are spatially close to vote similarly because of daily interactions. Arguments against determinism also rely on observed anomalies in voting results. An example arises in comparing results of presidential elections in the United States to the expectation of favoring Democratic or Republican candidates in urban or rural locations respectively or the expectations for preference on the county scale based on racial composition with minority groups favoring the Democratic party. The results indicate that anomalies occur in distinct voting areas where the Republican or Democratic candidate won counties that had opposite characteristics of their traditionally carried counties. These anomalies are attributed to the historical, economic, and cultural geographies which serve to override the territory traits that were used to predict the electoral results. In this way voters are motivated by factors outside their geography to vote in a way that is unexpected and often even contrary to their individual interests.

=== Electoral mapping ===
The spatial variations of support for particular policies are routinely mapped in order to pictorially represent the electoral geography of a territory, which can allow for the recognition of patterns of location. Ron Johnston considers the entire process and outcome of the election through the examining lens of territory maps. He claims that electoral results are the outcome of superimposing the map of cultural, economic, religious, and demographic characteristics with the determined map of electoral districts and applying the issues on the ballot. The selection of mapping paradigms using color, patterning, brightness or darkness effects is employed in order to visually detail aspects and characteristics of interest in elections, such as voter participation, intensity of support, population density, and constituency boundaries which may not easily be noticed by considering words and numbers. An example of a mapping paradigm is observed in United States elections in recent history, wherein results in favor of Democratic candidates are marked by coloring the constituency blue and using red for results in favor of Republican candidates. This has been used to a wide degree and is thus readily acknowledged by United States citizens in the media and academic display of election results. However, the variations in electoral results over a territory or place cannot be directly equated to the land areas represented by mapping as the voting populace is the subject of interest and study in electoral geography and not the particular territory they live on during a given election. Human movement is an ongoing progress, which consistently redefines the distributions of policy preference and thus the associated election decisions. Thus the passage of time must be incorporated in electoral analysis through the duality of Electoral geography also deals with the alterations of election results in a given place over an extended time interval encompassing many elections. This effect can be mapped using various techniques which help to show changing opinions and changing populations in the constituencies of the state over a time interval. Electoral geography relies upon detailed and accurate mapping techniques with appropriate contextualization and background knowledge in order to successfully visualize and analyze the results of an election.

== World electoral geographies ==
=== Canada ===
Canadian electoral geography is typified by a high degree of political regionalism, with most disputes interpreted as conflicts between provinces or regions. Notably, class consciousness is quite low in Canada as compared to the former mother country, Britain.

Because of the disparity in the population size of the various provinces, their importance in electoral geography varies substantially. As well some provinces are small enough and similar enough to their neighbours that they vote similarly, while others are large enough to have considerable internal divisions. The smaller Atlantic Provinces might be considered as unit, but Ontario might be subdivided between the urban, suburban, rural, and remote regions, or between north, south, east, and west, or into more specific regions like the Golden Horseshoe or the Greater Toronto Area.

In federal politics, a winning coalition must be composed of various sub-regions, identified not only by place but by ideology. A winning coalition might include Western social conservatives, suburban Ontario moderates, and Quebec soft nationalists (Brian Mulroney, 1984, 1988), or Ontario moderates, Quebec federalists, and most of Atlantic Canada (Jean Chretien, 1993, 1997, 2000), or most of the West and Atlantic Canada, plus rural and suburban Ontario (Stephen Harper, 2011).

When the main parties are not seen to serve the interest of a particular region, protest parties or movements often emerge. This has included several Quebec nationalist parties, parties arising from the phenomenon called Western alienation, and the Maritime Rights Movement. Partly for this reason, Canada has typically had a multi-party system for much of its history rather than the two-party system that is typical of first past the post elections. This has in turn led to several minority governments in Canada.

Regionalism in Canada is such that is also notable within provinces on the stage of provincial elections. There is considerable distinction between the politics of Montreal and those of the Saguenay or the Gaspe, and likewise between the Lower Mainland and the BC Interior.

=== United Kingdom ===
In the present United Kingdom, electoral geography is studied extensively and has been compared to the method in the United States of elections and regionalization, by employing UK methods of class cleavage, where the Conservative Party tends to be favoured by the white-collar class and the Labour Party by the UK’s working class. Comparing the methods of sectionalism in the UK and the US emphasizes location; in the United States, support for a party is based far more on the location, as compared to the class divide. In the UK, some areas are more heavily populated than others, giving differences in population relating to the geography of each individual voting district.

In the UK, to extinguish regional identity, England was divided into nine regions. It was thought that people who congregate seem to vote alike, rather than voting on one’s own opinions. This is what is known as the "neighborhood effect". Even with nine distinct regions, the voting patterns are seemingly disproportionally divided between the two dominant parties. This forces researchers to question what causes regional differences in voting outcomes.

The voting method in the UK differs from that of the United States. To produce an outcome, "all voting takes place in the context of a particular electoral system. There has to be some agreed way of aggregating votes to produce a result. Votes indicate individuals’ preferences and in the public elections these have to be translated into seats by some formula". This formulaic approach ends in an outcome giving a translated number of seats for each party in Parliament.

England is not alone in selecting its electoral system. “… A cross-national study found seventy different systems in twenty-seven democracies.” When choosing which system a government will use, great consideration has to be made. A serious question arises during this process; What should this election be designed to achieve? General answers have been:

- To enable the representation of voters’ opinion in rough proportion to their strength in the electorate
- To allow for the representation of geographically defined areas
- To decisively confer power on a team of leaders or a party.”

Voter awareness in terms of the reasoning, motivation, and methods of an election are critical for shoring up public support for the legitimacy of elections and elected officials.

=== Russia ===
The electoral geography of Russia is marked by the obvious territorial cleavages between North and South, urban and rural territories, etc. One phenomenon of territorial cleavages in electoral preferences in Russia is known as the "red belt" (compact located regions with high support for the Communist Party).

In the first democratic elections in the history of contemporary Russia it was noticed that liberal and democratic politicians had much higher support in the northern regions, whereas the south of Russia appeared more conservative.

Both capitals in Russia - Moscow and the "northern capital" Saint Petersburg - significantly differ in electoral results from the rest of the country. Only in these cities is there strong electoral support of liberal and democratic politicians. Support for United Russia is lower than in other regions.

=== United States ===
The electoral geography of the United States is a description of regional political differences, which in recent years has been popularized by the red and blue paradigm to pictorially represent Republican and Democratic Election results. The presence of a two-dominant party system creates a potential for disenfranchisement of minority voters and their opinions. Qualities of “northeasterliness”, “westerliness”, and “southerliness”, which constitute the expectations for Democratic, Republican, and volatile Republican voting results, have been used in order to understand and define the political landscape. However, culturally driven anomalies in this general expectation have been observed.

Debate has been common in recent elections in regards to the election of the President of the United States via the electoral college. The debate stems from the fact that the electoral college is a malapportioned body, and thus provides for a scenario whereby a candidate may win the election via the electoral college without carry a plurality of the popular vote.

== See also ==
- Electoral geography of Russia
