= John Ciaccia =

Canadian politician (1933–2018)

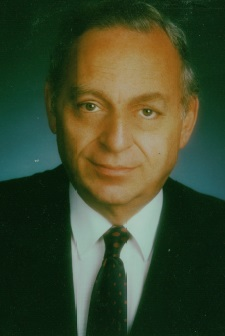
- Portrait of Ciaccia (c. 1985)

Member of the National Assembly of Quebec for Mont-Royal
- In office October 29, 1973 – November 30, 1998
- Preceded by: Riding Established
- Succeeded by: André Tranchemontagne

Personal details
- Born: Giambattista Nicola Ciaccia; March 4, 1933 Jelsi, Molise, Italy
- Died: August 7, 2018 (aged 85) Beaconsfield, Quebec, Canada
- Party: Quebec Liberal Party
- Profession: Lawyer
- Portfolio: Energy and Natural Resources, International Affairs, Native Affairs, Immigration and Cultural Communities

John Ciaccia (born Giambattista Nicola Ciaccia; March 4, 1933 – August 7, 2018) was a Canadian politician who was provincial cabinet minister from Montreal, Quebec. He served as a member of the National Assembly of Quebec from 1973 to 1998, representing the Mount Royal riding for the Quebec Liberal Party. He occupied various posts in the cabinets of Liberal premiers Robert Bourassa, and Daniel Johnson Jr., such as minister of Energy and Natural Resources, International Affairs, Native Affairs, and Immigration and Cultural Communities.

At his resignation, Ciaccia was the longest-serving member of the Assembly. Ciaccia gained international attention for his efforts in negotiating the end of the Oka Crisis alongside his federal counterpart, Tom Siddon, in 1990. Former Quebec Premier Jean Charest described Ciaccia's political career as having "revolutionized relations with the native people and cultural communities of Quebec by always favouring an approach marked by respect."

== Early life ==
John Ciaccia was born Giambattista Nicola Ciaccia in the Italian town of Jelsi in the Province of Campobasso, Molise region on March 4, 1933. He emigrated to Canada via Ellis Island in the United States, in 1937, with his mother and elder sister reuniting with their father, who had already come to Montreal in 1935. Ciaccia recalled the trials of growing up in another country, being viewed by some as an outsider. This was compounded during the years of the Second World War, as his native Italy fought Canada and the Allies. Ciaccia became fluent in both English and French at an early age, reading novels and encyclopedias in both languages as a child. Ciaccia attributes his academic success in part to the encouragement of his mother, with whom he kept a close relationship until her death in 1990.

Ciaccia attended the English-speaking, Catholic, D'Arcy McGee High School. Ciaccia received his BA from McGill University in 1953. He then pursued his studies at McGill's prestigious Faculty of Law, whose faculty, at the time, consisted of future Supreme Court and Superior Court justices. As a law student, Ciaccia became managing editor of the McGill Law Journal where he published an analysis, "Perron v. School Trustees of the School Municipality of Rouyn: Case and Comment". He received his law degree in 1956 and was admitted to the Quebec Bar in 1957; he began practising for the Montreal-based firm, Malouf & Shorteno.

In 1959, Ciaccia began working for the legal department of the now-defunct Steinberg's grocery chain – at the time, one of the largest in Quebec. Ciaccia would eventually become the chain's director of real estate. Throughout the 1960s he continued to practice law.

While still practising law, he acted as a consultant for the Canadian department of Indian Affairs. In 1971, he was offered a position in the federal civil service, as assistant deputy minister of Indian affairs and northern development, headed at the time by future prime minister Jean Chrétien. Initially reluctant, Ciaccia's decision to quit practising law and accept the position was cemented by a case he had recently handled: where a "remorseless" client of his negotiating terms of a contract that would prove ruinous for the already financially strained other party. Ciaccia was later told by a colleague the soon to be bankrupt man left his clients' office in tears. This led Ciaccia to, "leave a thriving law practice in Montreal for a low-paying position in Ottawa to deal with the unresolved problems of mistreated peoples..."

== Civil service ==
As assistant deputy minister, Ciaccia helped negotiate development projects on native territory, addressing the sensitive issue of land rights. This often involved face-to-face meetings across the country with members of aboriginal communities, including elders and chiefs. Ciaccia implemented the native youth liaison program which employed natives to help coordinate native youth programs throughout Canada. The program proved controversial. Militant elements of the native movement interpreted it as an attempt to usurp power from the chiefs. Bureaucrats at the Ministry viewed the new program with apprehension as well. Ciaccia lashed out at both sides, denouncing both "power-hungry" Native politicians as well as "idiots in the Indian Affairs department who hate Indians." His remarks caused a brief uproar, with one Conservative MP calling for his resignation. Indian Affairs minister Jean Chrétien defended Ciaccia, noting the difficult nature of his deputy's workload.

In 1972, Ciaccia helped found the Indian Way School, in the Kahnawake Mohawk reserve south of Montreal. The school was established in response to concerns of natives that their children's culture was being assimilated at the (mostly white) Billings School in nearby Chateauguay. Days before Ciaccia officially resigned from the civil service to run in the 1973 Quebec general election, The Globe and Mail lauded Ciaccia for his initiatives that helped "decentralize Indian Affairs and give more power to Indians themselves."

== 1973–1976: MNA under Bourassa ==
=== Entry into provincial politics ===
On September 25, 1973, Quebec Premier Robert Bourassa called a general election for October 29. Bourassa asked Ciaccia to run in the newly formed electoral riding of Mont-Royal, a multicultural area of Montreal, regarded as a Liberal stronghold. Ciaccia accepted the offer, resigning from his Federal post in the department of Indian Affairs. Ciaccia was easily elected, with 83% of the vote and would go on to represent the riding for the next 25 years.

=== Negotiating James Bay Agreement ===
In the 1960s, the province of Quebec began developing potential hydroelectric resources in the sparsely populated North, inhabited mostly by various native groups, such as the Cree and Inuit. In 1971, the government of Premier Robert Bourassa created the James Bay Development Corporation to pursue the development of mining, forestry and other potential resources starting with the James Bay Hydroelectric Project. The proposed project faced fierce resistance from the native Cree and Inuit populations. By early 1973, he was touting it as "the key to economic and social progress in Quebec." In September, a general election was called for October 29. Early in the campaign, Bourassa sought to make the issue a key pillar to the Liberal party platform, pledging to pursue the multibillion-dollar project if re-elected.

In the immediate aftermath of the Liberal victory, it had been widely anticipated Ciaccia would be given a cabinet post in the new Bourassa government. However, on November 20, 1973, he was chosen as the premier's personal representative for negotiations with native groups affected by the proposed James Bay project. Ciaccia, considered a "specialist on native peoples", was tasked with finalizing a deal between Quebec and the natives. The project had gained a sense of urgency in recent days. The Quebec Superior Court had recently granted the Cree and Inuit a temporary injunction, essentially shutting down the project costing the government an estimated $500,000 a day.

Elected as an MNA and subsequently chosen as the government's chief negotiator, John Ciaccia sought to find common ground. On December 21, 1973, the provincial government's position was strengthened when the Supreme Court ruled against the current injunction granted weeks earlier. In exchange for ending further legal obstruction to the project, Ciaccia initially offered affected native communities a reported $100 million in royalties along with increased hunting and fishing rights. In early February 1974, Cree and Inuit leaders officially refused the offer, stating that land concessions and recognition of native rights throughout Quebec—not money—were the main sticking points. Ciaccia publicly suggested native leaders were overstating their peoples' genuine opposition to the project, offering to personally travel North to gauge the reaction himself. Ciaccia made good on his offer and in April 1974 visited the Cree village of Fort George in northern Quebec. He spent hours answering questions from hundreds of residents in a school auditorium. Negotiations continued throughout 1974 with an agreement in principle being reached in November. It would take another 12 months for the details to be finalized. In the early hours of November 12, 1975, Cree and Inuit leaders signed the landmark treaty which granted them a combined 60,000 square miles in land rights and $225 million over 20 years. The agreement was seen a precedent for similar land disputes in other provinces. James O'Reilly, one of the lawyers representing the native groups, praised Ciaccia's level-headed approach during negotiations, "playing it cool" in the face of emotionally charged discussions.

=== Opposition to Bill 22 ===
In early 1974, it was reported the Bourassa Liberals were preparing legislation that would limit the ability of non-English speaking parents to send their children to English schools. However, as the 1974 National Assembly session begun, it became clearer that language of schooling was only part of a bolder proposal to establish French as the official language of Quebec: Bill 22. The proposed legislation was largely opposed by both Anglophones and immigrant communities, seen as the imposition of second class citizenship on non-Francophones. Ciaccia, one of nine Anglophone Liberal MNAs at the time, opposed the Bill, criticizing its discriminatory nature. By March 1974, Ciaccia along with four other Anglo MNAs announced their intention go against party lines and vote against the Bill. Ultimately, Ciaccia and George Springate were the only Liberal MNAs to vote against the Bill in its second reading when it reached its second reading in July 1974. Responding to criticism from within the party that two MNAs voted against the government, Premier Bourassa suspended both Springate and Ciaccia, barring them from Caucus meetings. Ciaccia nevertheless continued his role as chief government negotiator with the Cree and Inuit on the James Bay project. Bourassa would eventually welcome Ciaccia and Springate back into the caucus after less than 2 months.

== 1976–1985: Member of the Opposition ==
On October 20, 1976, with the Liberals high in the polls and a divided opposition, Premier Robert Bourassa called an election for November 15. The Liberals however, ended up losing to a Patri Québecois majority. John Ciaccia was one of 26 Liberals who managed to hold on to their seats. Over the next 9 years of separatist Parti Québecois rule, Ciaccia was an eminent voice for both federalism and Quebec's non-francophones. During his years in the opposition, he occupied various shadow cabinet posts, acting as critic for native affairs, transport, housing, and industry and commerce.

Ciaccia was a vocal opponent of the Parti Quebecois' 1977 landmark Charter of the French Language, characterizing the legislation as one "that restricts our liberties and a vision which will result in the phasing out of the English [community in Quebec]."

During the 1977–1978 Liberal leadership race (Bourassa having resigned after the 1976 election defeat) Ciaccia announced his support for Claude Ryan, a former publisher at Le Devoir. At a press conference alongside Ryan, Ciaccia highlighted Ryan's opposition to the controversial Bill 101. During the press conference, Ryan surprised many in the room, Ciaccia included, by speaking in Italian for the next 2 minutes, thanking the MNA for his support. Ciaccia's endorsement of Ryan was significant, as Ciaccia was considered a leading "spokesman for Quebec ethnic groups"—a traditional bastion of Liberal support. Ryan would go on to become Liberal leader.

During the 1980 referendum campaign on Quebec independence from Canada, Ciaccia was an executive member of the "No" campaign committee, frequently attending and speaking at federalist rallies in the Montreal area. In the run-up to May 20 vote, Ciaccia raised concerns that voters in Montreal areas with significant immigrant populations (who mainly opposed succession from Canada) were being excluded from the list of electors. The "No" campaign would go on to win the referendum by a margin of 60% to 40%.

In the 1981 general election, the Parti Quebecois was given a second majority mandate. Ciaccia was able to easily retain his Mont-Royal seat with 81% percent of the vote. Claude Ryan was eventually forced out as Liberal leader in August 1982 and succeeded by Gerard Levesque in the interim, until a new leader would be chosen in October 1983. Ciaccia seriously considered running for the leadership, but ultimately decided not to run. It had been suggested by some, that regardless of his chances, Ciaccia should nevertheless run so that "non-francophones can aspire to lead [the] party." However, when explaining his decision not to run Ciaccia specifically mentioned the possibility that his (mostly non-francophone) supporters would have felt alienated from the rest of the party. The Montreal Gazette editorial board attributed Ciaccia's decision to a "sad unwritten rule" that only francophones could aspire to high political office in Quebec. Ex-premier Robert Bourassa would go on win the party nomination and return as the party leader.

== 1985–1994: Cabinet minister ==
=== Minister of Energy and Natural Resources ===
In the 1985 general election Ciaccia once again retained his seat by a comfortable margin. The election marked the comeback of Premier Robert Bourassa whose Liberals won a commanding majority. Ciaccia, who had already served under Bourassa's first mandate, was promoted to a position in Liberal cabinet as Minister of Energy and Natural Resources, officially sworn in on December 12. As minister of Energy and Natural Resources, Ciaccia oversaw of the portfolios of two delegated cabinet ministers: Albert Coté (responsible for Forestry) and Raymond Savoie (in charge of both Mining and Native Affairs).

As minister of energy, Ciaccia sought ensure Quebecers paid a price on fuel more in line with the national average. Soon after he became minister, a federal probe confirmed what many had already suspected: consumers in Quebec were paying up to an extra $500 million a year for imported gasoline due to insufficient refining domestic capacity. This would soon be exacerbated by plans to close an oil refinery in east end Montreal. Initially owned by Gulf Canada, the refinery was to be sold to British-owned Ultramar Canada which subsequently intended on closing it by year's end. Ciaccia urged his federal counterpart, Pat Carney, to block the sale. The Progressive Conservative federal government led by Brian Mulroney refused to block the sale. Ciaccia sought to find another buyer for the refinery that would keep it operational. Ultimately, Ciaccia managed to get Ultramar to sell part of the refinery specializing in petrochemicals (and not gasoline) to Montreal-based Lavelin Inc. The remainder of the refinery was dismantled, a decision strongly criticized by Ciaccia as short-sighted and detrimental to Quebec's future energy needs. In the months following the refinery's closure, gasoline prices increased throughout the province.

Towards the end of 1986, Ciaccia grew increasingly frustrated with what he viewed as gouging of companies by the oil companies. In November, Ultramar raised the price of gasoline by 2 cents a litre, a move quickly followed by other distributors throughout the province. Ciaccia singled out the company for "taking advantage of Quebeckers." In addition, high gas prices persisted in outlying regions despite a measure in the 1985 budget which lowered the gasoline surtax by 10 percent compared to the rest of the province. Ciaccia commissioned a 1987 report which concluded oil companies and gasoline distributors were pocketing most of the tax cuts on the retail price of gasoline in Quebec's outlying regions, failing to pass down the savings to consumers. The report estimated that over $20 million in tax cuts intended for consumers were being pocketed by oil companies, distributors, and retailers.

In June 1987, Ciaccia issued a decree, valid for 3 months, controlling the price of gasoline, setting a ceiling on the price in outlying regions. Ciaccia later extended the decree in order to, "give him time to set up a body to help consumers benefit from fair prices." In search of a more permanent solution, Ciaccia helped draft Bill 93, which was passed into law on November 12, 1987. The bill created an agency charged with monitoring gasoline prices throughout the province, while also reaffirming "the government's right to set gasoline prices" via cabinet decree.

As minister of Energy and Natural Resources, John Ciaccia attempted to rejuvenate the struggling pulp and paper industry in the province. During his tenure, he helped launch and give subsidies to two paper mill projects : the reopening of an idle plant in Port-Cartier and the construction of a new one in Matane.

Re-opening the mill in Port-Cartier would create over 400 jobs. The plant, closed by its previous owner, ITT Rayonier in 1979 was to be jointly owned by Quebec-based Cascades Inc and the state-owned Rexfor. The provincial government paid $102 million to reopen the plant compared to only $5 million by Cascades. The federal government refused to provide any funds or grants for Port Cartier.

In April 1986, Ciaccia sent a proposal to the Norwegian company Saugbrugs Forenginen to set up a $327 million paper mill in the town of Matane. Saugbrugs showed interest in the proposal and responded to Ciaccia in June with a counter-offer. The proposed project was hindered by the federal government's initial refusal to provide funding and in January 1987, Saugbrugs backed out of the project. Ciaccia accused the Mulroney Conservatives of stalling on the construction of the Matane mill in the economically depressed Gaspé, a project they had endorsed during the previous federal election. The federal and provincial governments reached a joint funding agreement valued at over $25 million October 1987 in which Donohue Inc (of which Quebecor Inc held a majority stake) would build and operate the Matane plant. Construction for the $290 million plant in Matane (scaled-down in size from the $600 initially envisioned by Donahue) began in late 1988. The plant would employ 125 workers and generate an estimated 1,600 jobs in spin-off industries.

Both the Matane and Port-Cartier projects were highly contentious within the pulp and paper industry itself, which was already suffering from overcapacity throughout North America. B.K. Koken, president of Abitibi-Price Inc called Ciaccia's attempt to bring a plant to Matane "a disservice to the industry," adding that public funds "should not be used to prolong uneconomic activities.

=== Language wars: Bill 178 ===
In 1988, segments of the anglophone community began to complain that the Bourassa Liberals were once again taking their support for granted. In the run-up to the 24th Liberal general convention in February 1988, Alliance Quebec president Royal Orr criticized the party for ignoring the community's "legitimate concerns" risking a crisis within the party. Ciaccia, one of four anglophone cabinet ministers responded to criticism his party was ignoring English-speakers, saying, "Just because we're not waving the flag doesn't mean we're ignoring the community." Commentators in the English media continued to criticize Ciaccia and other anglophone MNAs for not taking harder stands against what they viewed as attempts to marginalize the province's English speakers.

Tensions grew in late March when both the PQ and Liberals (including all 21 Anglophone MNAs) backed a motion condemning the federal official language commissioner D'Iberville Fortier for stating that Quebec was "humiliating" its anglophone population. Ciaccia justified his support of the motion, arguing that "Fortier did us a disservice by talking about humiliation...This is not the time for inflammatory remarks...". Ciaccia said his riding office received insulting phone calls from English residents, angry over his decision.

In December 1988, the Supreme Court of Canada struck down a section of Bill 101 (implemented by the PQ in 1977) which forbade the use of languages other from French on business signs, on the grounds that it violated the Charter of Rights and Freedoms' guarantee of the right of expression. The Quebec Liberals responded by tabling legislation, Bill 178, that would still prohibit other languages on outdoor business signs, but would permit bilingual signage indoors. In a sign of protest, the three other anglophone cabinet ministers, Clifford Lincoln, Herbert Marx, and Richard French, resigned from Bourassa's cabinet. Ciaccia, however, decided to stay, questioning any good that would come from his resigning, saying he could do more for anglophones by remaining in cabinet.

Gazette columnist Don MacPherson, previously critical of Ciaccia, praised him for showing "heroism of a different kind in deciding to try to continue to defend minority interests within the cabinet... He is bound to face some harsh criticism for not having joined his colleagues in restoring the honor of the community. He knew that, which makes his decision a courageous one in its own way." The Gazette editorial board, despite calling on all four cabinet ministers to resign nevertheless acknowledged Ciaccia's decision: "That is not to condemn the fourth anglophone minister, John Ciaccia, for choosing a different path...because he believes he can serve his community better from within cabinet."

In May 1989, with an election coming in the fall, Ciaccia addressed a hostile crowd at an Alliance Quebec convention. In the wake of the newly formed Equality Party, he urged the association's members to continue supporting the Liberals, lest the party no longer feel obliged to answer the needs of anglophones in Quebec. Ciaccia later told reporters that he "felt like Daniel in the Lion's den" at the convention.

Despite the criticism from sections of the anglophone community, Ciaccia comfortably retained his seat in the 1989 general election, defeating Equality candidate Nat Bernstein by 5,165 votes.

=== Minister of International Affairs and Minister of Native Affairs ===
Following the 1989 re-election of a Bourassa Liberal majority, Ciaccia remained a cabinet minister and was given two separate portfolios: International Relations and Native Affairs. Ciaccia already had experience with the Native community in the 1970s: first as a federal civil servant, then as chief provincial negotiator during James Bay Hydroelectric development.

==== Meech Lake Accord ====
Ciaccia was a staunch supporter of the Meech Lake Accord, a package of proposed amendments to the Canadian Constitution, intended to persuade Quebec to sign on the Constitution Act of 1982. At the time of its initial negotiation in 1987, the Accord was supported by the premiers of all ten provinces along with the majority of Canadians. In the lead up to the June 1990 deadline for its approval, opposition began to mount. One of the many criticisms tabled against the accord was the supposed preferential treatment it gave the province of Quebec. One of the Accord's fiercest opponents was former Prime Minister Pierre Elliott Trudeau. Trudeau argued that the Quebec government did not need additional powers nor did Quebec need to be recognized as a "distinct society".

On January 22, 1990, 5 months before the deadline for reaching an agreement, Ciaccia responded to these criticisms in The Globe and Mail, framing the Accord, "Not as final chapter in our constitutional history, but as a stepping stone upon which we can build a solid future.". Contrary to Trudeau's claim that any reference to a "distinct society" was an insult, Ciaccia highlighted how recognition of cultural differences are arguably a key part of the Canadian identity.

The accord would eventually fail to be finalized due in part to opposition from the provincial governments of Manitoba and Newfoundland. The failure of Meech is generally as the principal driving force behind the rebirth of the sovereignty movement in the early 1990s, and the subsequent defeat of the Quebec Liberals to the Parti Quebecois in 1994.

==== Oka Crisis ====
In March 1989, Oka Golf Club announced plans to expand its 9-hole golf course to a full 18. Close to the Kanehsatake reserve, the land in question included a native burial ground, marked by standing tombstones. Protests by Mohawks and environmentalists temporarily postponed the project, as the provincial government attempted to determine whether natives held a valid claim on the land. Such a process would take time as it involved going over land claims dating back to the 18th century. In his memoir on the crisis, Ciaccia argues that the dispute could have been solved quickly, noting "there was one key parcel of land without which the golf course could not be extended...Buy this land, and the most pressing problem would be solved. This is exactly what my officials in Quebec proposed to the federal minister of Indian Affairs[, Tom Siddon]." Ciaccia travelled to Ottawa himself to discuss the situation privately with his federal counterpart. Siddon, however decided not to purchase the land, arguing that there first needed to be stable band local leadership on the part of Kanehsatake Mohawks In April 1990, when negotiations stalled, Mohawks erected a roadblock on the road leading to land in dispute, effectively barricading it off from potential developers.

On Tuesday, May 8, after the barricades received media attention, Ciaccia privately met with Oka mayor, Jean Ouellette. Ouellette showed Ciaccia plans for the proposed golf course expansion, which included residential development, and claimed the city would lose $2 million should the project fail to proceed. In an attempt to resolve the situation, Ciaccia privately assured Ouellette he would find the $2 million, thus allowing the Mohawks to keep their sacred ground undisturbed, while at the same time compensate the municipality for tax revenue. Ciaccia left the meeting confident a deal would soon be reached. Two days later, much to his surprise, Ouellette informed him the project would not be abandoned for $2 million, announcing his intention to have the barricades removed. Years later, Ciaccia would recall: "[Ouellette] made a complete about-face. He was pressing 'onward into the mouth of hell'...pursuing plans that would allow not a noble cause, but the destruction of natural beauty and the desecration of Native lands."

By June 30, the municipality of Oka obtained a legal injunction to have the barricades removed, which the Mohawks refused to acknowledge. On July 10, against Ciaccia's wishes, mayor Ouellette asked the Sureté du Québec to enforce the injunction and dismantle the roadblock. Early next morning, on July 11, provincial police raided the barricades. Gunfire was exchanged with one police casualty; Corporal Marcel Lemay died from a gunshot wound to the mouth. Police had to retreat as teargas they'd fired blew back in their direction.

The Canadian Army was subsequently called in, with a tense standoff ensuing for the rest of the summer. In a show of solidarity Mohawks in Kahnawake (a reserve on Montreal's south shore) would block the Mercier Bridge for several weeks. The crisis would go on to generate considerable anti-native sentiment in the province. The plight of Canada's indigenous peoples would also receive international attention and condemnation. Provincial highways leading to both Kanehsatake and Kahnawake were blocked by police. The standoff finally came to an end on September 26, 1990, with a negotiated surrender on the part of Mohawks. Plans to expand the golf course were eventually cancelled.

Ciaccia faced criticism for his handling of the crisis. While some commentators praised his repeated efforts to find common ground between both sides, others accused him of not taking a harder stance towards the Natives, thus giving the impression of a breakdown of law and order. On July 26, 1990 it was reported that Ciaccia was allowing Mohawks to use a dock on the land of a Dorval property he owned. It was being used to ferry in supplies to Kahnawake, which had been blocked off by police checkpoints. The report caused a public outcry. Ciaccia acknowledged the dock's existence but maintained it was used solely for sending in essential goods such as food and medical supplies. In the aftermath of the crisis, both Ciaccia and Sam Elkas (then minister of public security) lost their ministerial positions in a cabinet shuffle in October 1990. This was widely seen as a rebuke from Bourassa for their handling of the crisis. Ciaccia nevertheless held on to his post as minister of International Trade.

Despite his perceived sympathies for the Mohawks, Ciaccia was nevertheless critical of international condemnation regarding the provincial and federal government's handling of the Oka Crisis. On September 13, 1990 the European Parliament passed a resolution condemning the Canadian government's treatment of its Native population. In January 1991, Ciaccia would meet a delegation of MEPs who had come to Montreal on a fact-finding mission. After the meeting, Ciaccia told reporters that European lawmakers appeared to have some serious misconceptions of what had taken place during the crisis: namely that Ottawa has forcefully expropriated Mohawk land and that martial law had been declared. In light of this, Ciaccia stated, "the European Parliament is not here to tell Canada anything...it is here to learn."

According to a 1991 report on the crisis, released by the Six Nations Iroquois Confederacy, Ciaccia stated he felt undermined by the provincial police during negotiations to end the standoff. During a 1993 coroner's inquest into the death of Corporal Lemay, Ciaccia testified that prior to the raid, he warned both the premier's office and his colleague, Public Security Minister Sam Elkas, that a police raid on the barricade could very well turn bloody.

In 2000, Ciaccia published a personal memoir of the crisis, The Oka Crisis: A Mirror of the Soul.

==== International Affairs ====
As minister of international affairs, Ciaccia served as Quebec's chief representative in the international community from 1989 to 1994. Ciaccia participated in many trade missions, in search of potentially new markets for Quebec exporters. As minister, Ciaccia, visited over 40 countries including: Iran, Saudi Arabia, Mexico, Poland, China, Vietnam, Israel, South Africa, France, Italy, Egypt, and the United States. Ciaccia was an ardent supporter of the North American Free Trade Agreement, arguing it would increase growth in Quebec's service and high-tech industries, among others.

In 1990, with the fall of Communism in Eastern Europe, John Ciaccia and Roland Dumas, the French foreign minister at the time, proposed a working group designed to gauge the needs of French speakers in Poland, Romania, and Hungary, to determine the best way to sustain those linguistic minorities. The following year, Ciaccia headed trade missions to Hungary and Poland with the goal of strengthening economic and cultural ties between Quebec and the former Eastern Bloc countries.

In 1992, Ciaccia visited Vietnam on a trade mission, another country in the process of liberalizing its economy. He helped sign an agreement promoting economic and technological cooperation between Vietnam and Quebec.

==== Immigration and Cultural Communities ====
Robert Bourassa resigned as premier and Liberal leader, due to his deteriorating health, in September 1993. Daniel Johnson Jr would emerge as Liberal leader and Premier in January 1994, along with a newly shuffled cabinet. Ciaccia was given a new portfolio, Immigration and Cultural Communities, in addition to his previously held one in International Affairs.

In outlining a three-year plan on immigration, Ciaccia addressed concerns that the French language was in danger on the island of Montreal, where most immigrants to Quebec choose to settle. In the spring of 1994, Ciaccia held consultations across the province to determine whether the number of immigrants admitted annually should be revised. In June 1994, Ciaccia would eventually decide to keep immigration levels steady for the next three years, at around 43,000 a year

== 1994–1998: Opposition ==
In 1994, with an upcoming election and the Liberals trailing the PQ in the polls, Ciaccia considered retiring from politics. Despite many other Liberal cabinet ministers deciding to leave politics before the election was called, Ciaccia ultimately decided to run. He would, once more, be re-elected in the riding of Mont-Royal. The election ushered in a majority Parti Quebec government, which soon set a date of October 30, 1995 for a referendum on independence.

Just as he did during the 1980 referendum, Ciaccia actively campaigned for the "No" side in the 1995 referendum, acting as strategist for the No Committee. In the run-up to the vote, he accused the PQ of trying to block immigrants (a largely federalist constituency) from voting, via Bill 40, which would have set up the province's first computerized list of voters. On January 25, 1995, Ciaccia, along with 3 other anglophone MNAs (Thomas Mulcair, Geoffrey Kelley, and Christos Sirros) penned an opinion piece in the Gazette, denouncing Bill 40. The piece argued that, "with a referendum on the horizon, the government believes that these new rules would help its side when the votes are counted on referendum day." In the lead-up to the referendum, Ciaccia made appearances at cultural and community events, and participated in media interviews, arguing for the federalist, "No" campaign. The "No" side would go on to win the referendum by a narrow margin of 50.6% to 49.4%.

In September 1998, with a general election set for November 30, Ciaccia announced he would not be seeking re-election. "I feel that I have done as much as I could and that the time has come for me to try to do other things, to meet other challenges," he explained to the Gazette. When asked if he faced pressure within the party to step aside, Ciaccia insisted the decision was made solely on his own accord, stating, "no one, no one, ever suggested that I shouldn't run again." At the time of his decision to retire, he was the longest-serving member of the National Assembly. During the final day of his mandate, he received a standing ovation from members of all parties in the assembly along with a farewell handshake from PQ Premier Lucien Bouchard. According to fellow Liberal MNA, Thomas Mulcair, who shared an office with Ciaccia, "He has always been there to help and to give good advice and I am going to miss him a lot."

== Retirement and death ==
After retiring as MNA in 1998, Ciaccia remained a supporter of both the federal Liberals and Quebec Liberal Party. As a resident of the Montreal suburb of Beaconsfield, Ciaccia supported the controversial mega-city in which all municipalities on the Island of Montreal merged into one city. During the 2004 vote to de-merge from Montreal, Ciaccia campaigned for Beaconsfield to remain a part of the mega-city, serving on the pro-merger committee. In May 2004, Beaconsfield would vote to de-merge from Montreal. Ciaccia was a well-known figure in Montreal's Italian community, and frequent invitee to events organized by the Italian Chamber of Commerce. Ciaccia played piano for various fundraisers. A lifelong pianist, Ciaccia was inspired as a child by boogie-woogie greats such as Fats Waller (against the wishes of his mother, an ardent classicist).

Ciaccia wed Norma May Murphy (daughter of Edward Murphy and Phyllis Audrey Redman) on September 7, 1957 at Saint Aloysius Parish in Montreal, later honeymooning in Europe; they would remain married for over 30 years before divorcing. Ciaccia had one son, Mark (born in 1962,) and two grandsons, Erik and Nicholas.

In the fall of 2015, 40 years after the James Bay agreement, Ciaccia released his memoir, Call Me Giambattista.

Ciaccia died in his home in Beaconsfield, Quebec on August 7, 2018, at the age of 85.
