= Lieutenant Governor of Quebec =

Representative in Quebec of the Canadian monarch

- Lieutenant-gouverneur du Québec
- The Coat of arms of Quebec used by the lieutenant governor

- Standard of the lieutenant governor
- Incumbent; Manon Jeannotte since January 25, 2024
- Office of the Lieutenant Governor of Quebec
- Style: Her Honour the Honourable
- Appointer: The governor general on the advice of the prime minister
- Term length: At the governor general's pleasure
- Formation: July 1, 1867
- First holder: Sir Narcisse-Fortunat Belleau
- Website: lieutenante-gouverneure.quebec/en/

The lieutenant governor of Quebec (/lɛfˈtɛnənt/; French: lieutenant-gouverneur du Québec, pronounced [ljøtnɑ̃t ɡuvɛʁnœʁ dy kebɛk]) (Note: When the officeholder is female, the French title is lieutenante-gouverneure du Québec, pronounced [ljøtnɑ̃tə ɡuvɛʁnœʁ dy kebɛk].) is the representative in Quebec of the monarch, who operates distinctly within the province but is also shared equally with the ten other jurisdictions of Canada. The lieutenant governor of Quebec is appointed in the same manner as the other provincial viceroys in Canada and is similarly tasked with carrying out most of the monarch's constitutional and ceremonial duties. The present and 30th lieutenant governor of Quebec is Manon Jeannotte, who has served in the role since January 25, 2024.

== Role and presence ==
The lieutenant governor of Quebec is tasked with a number of governmental duties. Not among them, though, is delivering the Throne Speech, which sets the lieutenant governor of Quebec apart from the other Canadian viceroys. (Instead, new parliaments begin with the Opening Speech by the premier.) The lieutenant governor is also expected to undertake various ceremonial roles. For instance, upon installation, the lieutenant governor automatically becomes a Knight or Dame of Justice and the Vice-Prior in Quebec of the Most Venerable Order of the Hospital of Saint John of Jerusalem. The lieutenant governor will present numerous other provincial honours and decorations and various awards that are named for and presented by the lieutenant governor, which were reinstated in 2000 by Lieutenant Governor Lise Thibault. These honours are presented at official ceremonies, which count among hundreds of other engagements the lieutenant governor takes part in each year, either as host or guest of honour; in 2006, the lieutenant governor of Quebec undertook 400 engagements and 200 in 2007.

Standard of the lieutenant governor of Quebec (1952–present)

Standard of the lieutenant governor of Quebec (1939–1952)

Standard of the lieutenant governor of Quebec (1870–1939)

At these events, the lieutenant governor's presence is marked by the lieutenant governor's standard, consisting of a blue field bearing the escutcheon of the Arms of His Majesty in Right of Quebec surmounted by a crown and set within a white disc; the Quebec viceregal flag is only one of two that are significantly different from all the others in Canada. Within Quebec, the lieutenant governor also follows only the sovereign in the province's order of precedence, preceding even other members of the Canadian Royal Family and the King's federal representative.

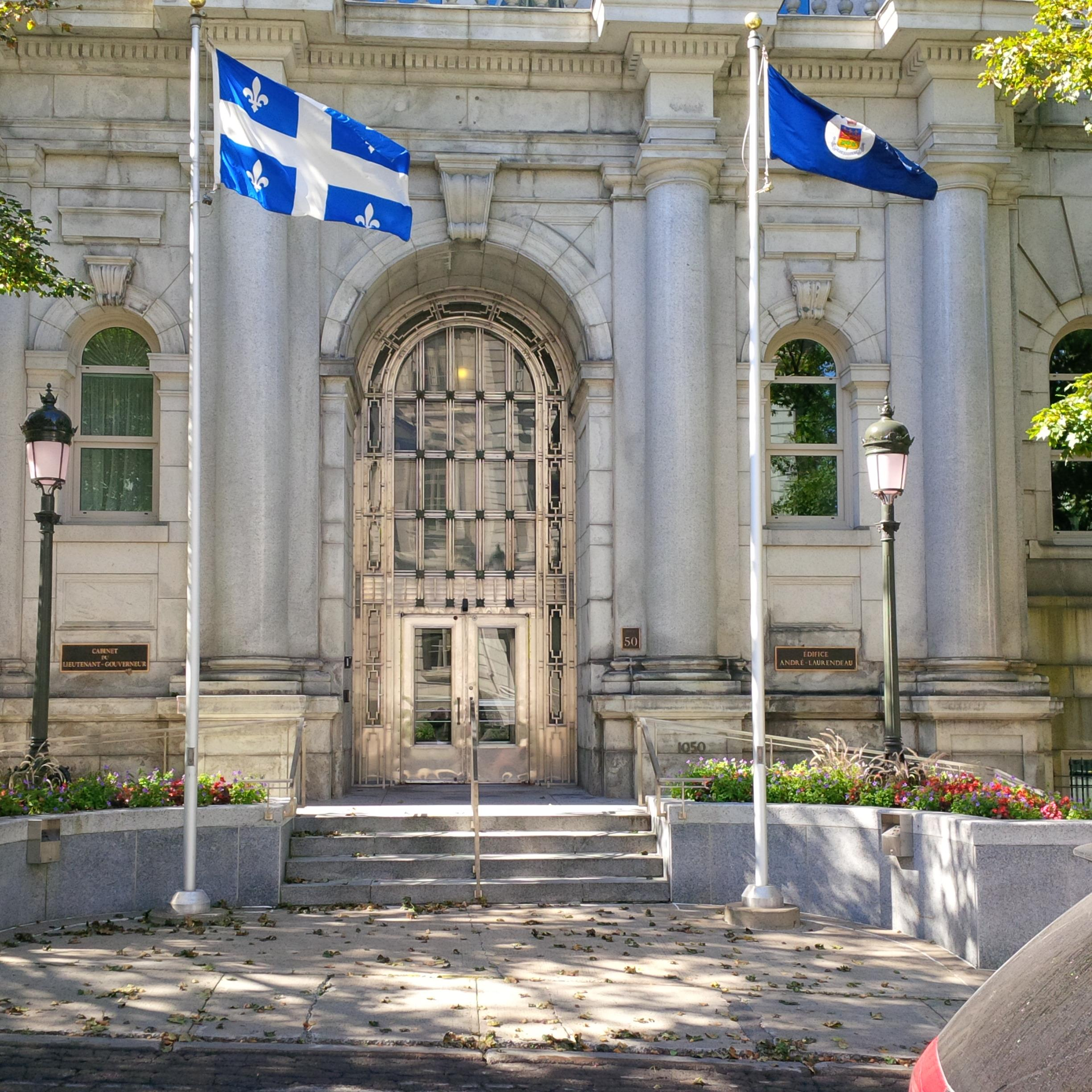
The entrance of the offices of the lieutenant governor of Quebec, at 1050 des Parlementaires (Édifice André-Laurendeau), in Québec City

It has been argued by Jeremy Webber and Robert Andrew Young that, as the office is the core of authority in the province, the secession of Quebec from the Confederation would first require the abolition or transformation of the post of lieutenant governor of Quebec; such an amendment to the constitution of Canada could not be done without, according to Section 41 of the Constitution Act, 1982, the approval of the federal parliament and all other provincial legislatures in Canada. Others, such as J. Woehrling, however, have claimed that the legislative process towards Quebec's independence would not require any prior change to the viceregal post. Young also felt that the lieutenant governor could refuse Royal Assent to a bill that proposed to put an unclear question on sovereignty to referendum or was based on the results of a referendum that asked such a question.

As of 2026, the government of Quebec intends to change the title of lieutenant-governor to “officer of Quebec” as part of a process of reducing the symbolic position of the monarchy in the province.

During the 2026 Quebec general election which the Parti Québécois won, it stated a PQ government would cut off funding to the lieutenant governor of Quebec and abolish the monarchy.

== History ==
The lieutenant governor of Quebec came into being in 1867, upon the creation of Quebec at Confederation. Since that date, 28 lieutenant governors have served the province, amongst whom were notable firsts, such as Lise Thibault—the first female and first disabled lieutenant governor of the province. The shortest mandate by a lieutenant governor of Quebec was that of Sir Lomer Gouin, from January to March 1929, while the longest was Hugues Lapointe, from 1966 to 1978.

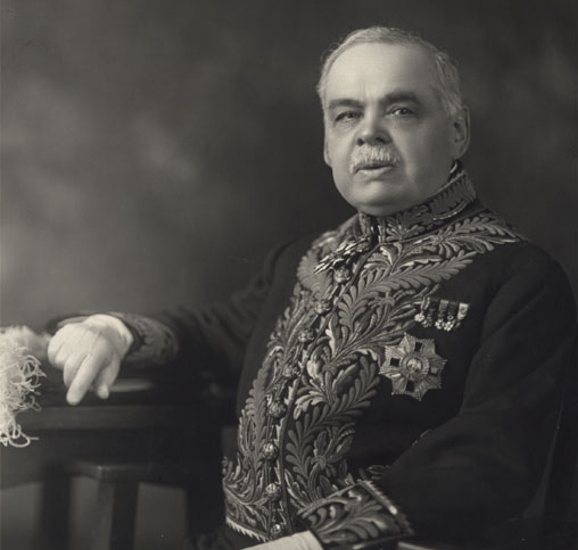
Lomer Gouin, 15th Lieutenant Governor of Quebec, from January to March 1929

One of the few examples in Canada of a viceroy exercising the royal prerogative against or without ministerial advice came in 1887, when Lieutenant Governor Auguste-Réal Angers dismissed the Cabinet headed by Premier Honoré Mercier; a report concluded that Mercier's government had benefited from a kickback scheme with contractors building the Baie des Chaleurs railway.

The appointment of Jean-Louis Roux as lieutenant governor of Quebec by Governor General Roméo LeBlanc, on the advice of Prime Minister Jean Chrétien, stirred controversy, as Roux was well known as a strong opponent of Quebec independence and, soon after he took up the post, it was revealed that, as a university student in the 1940s, he had worn a swastika on his lab coat in protest of the proposal to invoke conscription for service in World War II and had participated in an antisemitic protest. Roux had, in an interview after his appointment as lieutenant governor, stated that he might have to use the reserve powers of the Crown should certain circumstances arise following a referendum result in favour of Quebec's separation from Canada; a statement that displeased Roux's premier at the time, Lucien Bouchard. The following year, Bouchard tabled in the legislature three motions, calling the Office of the lieutenant governor "a heritage of the colonial past", the appointment process controversial and interfering, and demanding the post be abolished, though, until then, the federal Crown-in-Council should appoint a person "democratically designated by the Quebec Assembly".

== Residences and offices ==
Since 1997 there has been no official residence; the lieutenant governors must instead obtain their own home in or near the capital. However, they still retain an official office at Édifice André-Laurendeau.

Previous residences includes Sewell House (Maison Sewell, still standing) at 87, rue Saint-Louis, Spencer Wood from 1870 to 1966 (destroyed by fire 1966) and Dunn House (Maison Dunn, demolished 2002) at 1010 Grande Allée Ouest from 1967 to 1997.

== Expenses ==
The Office of the Lieutenant Governor of Quebec receives funding from the Government of Quebec, while the federal government separately incurs expenses related to the Lieutenant Governor's official duties.

For the 2025–26 Quebec budget|2025–2026 fiscal year, the Government of Quebec allocated $1.1631 million to the Office of the Lieutenant Governor, including $1.0485 million in remuneration and $114,600 in operating expenditures.

Separately, federal expenditures incurred by the Lieutenant Governor of Quebec in the exercise of official duties totalled $164,001 in the 2024–2025 fiscal year. These expenditures included $16,176 for travel and accommodation, $8,620 for hospitality, and $139,206 in operational and administrative expenses.

== See also ==
- Monarchy in the Canadian provinces
- Government of Quebec
- Lieutenant Governors of Canada
- List of seignories of Quebec
