= Departments of the Quebec Government =

These are the departments of the Quebec Government

- Municipal Affairs and Housing (French only)
- Agriculture, Fisheries and Food (French only)
- Executive Council (French only)
- Culture et Communications (French only)
- Economy, Innovation and Energy (French only)
- Education (French only)
- Employment and Social Solidarity (French only)
- Higher education (French only)
- Environment, Climate Change Combat, Wildlife and Parks (French only)
- Family (French only)
- Finances
- Immigration, Francization and Integration (French only)
- Justice (French only)
- French Language (French only)
- International Relations and Francophonie (French only)
- Natural Resources and Forests (French only)
- Health and Social Services (French only)
- Treasury Board Secretariat (French only)
- Tourism (French only)
- Transport and Sustainable Mobility
- Travail (French only)

== See also ==
- Politics of Quebec
- Government of Quebec
