= Ministry of Native Affairs (Quebec) =

The Minister of Native Affairs (Quebec) (French: Ministre des Affaires Autochtones (Québec)) is responsible for aboriginals within the province of Quebec, Canada.

The role of the position is to guarantee communication between the Aboriginal populations of Quebec and the government of Quebec.

The current Minister is Sylvie D’Amours. A former Minister in this position, John Ciaccia, became famous for his support of the Mohawk Indians during the Oka crisis.
