= Geography of Montreal =

Montreal is the second-largest city in Canada, after Toronto, and the largest city in the province of Quebec, located along the Saint Lawrence River at its junction with the Ottawa River. The city is geographically constrained, with the majority on the Island of Montreal in the Hochelaga Archipelago, and has several prominent features, including the eponymous Mount Royal. The region experiences four distinct seasons and is classified as a humid continental climate, with very cold and snowy winters and warm and humid summers.

== Geographic location ==
Map of boroughs & neighbourhoods on the island of Montreal.

Montreal is located in the southwest of the province of Quebec, approximately 275 kilometres (171 miles) southwest of Quebec's provincial capital, Quebec City, and 167 km (104 mi) east of Canada's federal capital, Ottawa. It also lies 502 km (312 mi) northeast of Ontario's provincial capital, Toronto, 407 km (253 mi) northwest of Boston, Massachusetts, and 530 km (330 mi) directly north of New York City, United States.

The city is located on the central and eastern portions of the Island of Montreal, the largest island in the Hochelaga Archipelago, at the confluence of the Saint Lawrence and Ottawa Rivers. The port of Montreal lies at one end of the Saint Lawrence Seaway, which is the river gateway that stretches from the Great Lakes into the Atlantic Ocean. Montreal is defined by its location in between the St. Lawrence river on its south, and by the Rivière des Prairies on its north. The city is named after the most prominent geographical feature on the island, a three-head hill called Mount Royal.

Montreal is at the centre of the Montreal Metropolitan Community, and is bordered by the city of Laval to the north, Longueuil to the south, Repentigny to the east and the West Island municipalities to the west. The anglophone enclaves of Westmount, Montreal West, Hampstead, Côte Saint-Luc, the Town of Mount Royal and the francophone enclave Montreal East are all entirely surrounded by the city of Montreal.

== Geology ==
There are three main geological regions in Quebec: the great igneous plains of the Canadian Shield, the Appalachians in southern Quebec, and the St. Lawrence lowlands that lie between them. Covering over 95% of Quebec, the Canadian Shield contains some of the oldest igneous rocks in the world, dating back to the Precambrian period, over 1 billion years ago. The Canadian Shield is generally quite flat and exposed, punctuated by the higher relief of mountain ranges such as the Laurentians in southern Quebec. The Appalachian region of Quebec is a thin strip of weathered mountains along Quebec's southeast border. The Appalachian mountain chain is actually a long range that runs from Alabama north to Newfoundland. The St. Lawrence lowlands are comparatively tiny in size (about 17,280 km^{2} (6,670 sq mi)) but disproportionately important in that they contain most of the human population of Quebec. The lowlands actually consist of three parts: the central lowlands, or the St. Lawrence Plain, a wide and flat triangle extending from Cornwall to Quebec City. The St. Lawrence Plain is almost entirely flat because of the clay deposits left behind by the Champlain Sea (which once covered all of Montreal).

== Street directions ==
One quirk of common Montreal parlance is that directions (north, south, east, and west) along the street grid are sharply skewed relative to the actual compass directions. The St. Lawrence River is taken as flowing west to east (even though it flows north or northeast past the island), so that directions along streets parallel to the river are referred to as "west" and "east", and those along streets perpendicular to the river, "north" and "south". In much of Montreal, "north" is actually northwest, and in some areas such as Verdun and Pointe-aux-Trembles it is actually due west. The skew is greatest in Ville-Émard, where grid "north" on streets such as Rue Jolicœur is geographically west-southwest.

"Montreal directions" are used in naming street addresses and describing bus routes, among other things. As a result of this discrepancy, Montreal has been called "the only city where the sun sets in the north."

Further folk naming customs include giving directions involving going "up" or "down" streets that are perpendicular to the river; "up" being towards Mount Royal and "down" being towards the St. Lawrence. But the system can be confusing on the north side of the mountain, where "up" still means Montreal "north" as it does downtown, but will literally be downhill from Mount Royal.

Streets are named "Ouest" or "Est" when they cross Saint Laurent Boulevard. Street numbers rise eastward and westward from Saint Laurent Boulevard, and northward from the St. Lawrence River and the Lachine Canal. (Rue Charlevoix, in Le Sud-Ouest borough, is the only remaining named "north-south" street with large numbers of addresses on both sides of the Lachine Canal. In this case, the addresses south of the Lachine Canal have a "0" prefixed to their street numbers, e.g., 0919 rue Charlevoix.)

== Climate ==
Montréal–Trudeau International Airport

Climate chart (precipitation, max. and min. temperature)
J	F	M	A	M	J	J	A	S	O	N	D
86 −5 −14	66 −3 −12	77 2 −7	90 11 1	86 19 8	84 24 14	91 27 17	94 26 16	89 21 11	103 13 5	84 6 −2	92 −1 −9
- █ Average max. and min. temperatures in °C
- █ Precipitation totals in mm
- Source: Environment Canada
Imperial conversion
J	F	M	A	M	J	J	A	S	O	N	D
3.4 23 8	2.6 26 10	3 36 20	3.5 52 34	3.4 67 47	3.3 76 57	3.6 80 62	3.7 78 60	3.5 70 52	4.1 56 40	3.3 43 29	3.6 30 16
- █ Average max. and min. temperatures in °F
- █ Precipitation totals in inches

Montreal lies at the confluence of several climatic regions. The island's climate is classified as humid continental or hemiboreal (Köppen climate classification Dfb) but is close to the transition to (Köppen climate classification Dfa)

Precipitation is abundant with an average snowfall of 216.6 cm (85.3 in) per year in the winter. Regular rainfall throughout the year averages 818.3 mm (32.22 in). Summer is the wettest season statistically, but it is also the sunniest.

The coldest month of the year is January, with a daily average temperature of −9.2 °C (15.4 °F) — averaging a daily low of −13.5 °C (7.7 °F), colder than either Moscow (−10 °C (14 °F)) or Saint Petersburg (−6 °C (21 °F)). Due to wind chill, the perceived temperature can be much lower than the actual temperature, and wind chill factor is often included in Montreal weather forecasts. The warmest month is July with an average daily high of 26.7 °C (80.1 °F); lower nighttime temperatures make an average of 21.7 °C (71.1 °F), thus air exchangers often achieve the same result as air conditioners. The lowest temperature ever recorded was −37.8 °C (−36.0 °F) on 15 January 1957 and the highest temperature ever was 37.6 °C (99.7 °F) on 1 August 1975. High humidity is common in the summer, which makes the perceived temperature higher than the actual temperature. In spring and autumn, rainfall averages between 67 and 102 mm (2.6 and 4.0 in) a month. Some snow in spring and autumn is normal. Similarly, early and late heat waves with "Indian summers" are a regular feature of the climate.

2006 was noted as the only year in the history of Montreal when there was more rain than there was snow. There were 122.3 cm (48.1 in) of snow, and there were 1,225.2 mm (48.24 in) of rain. That year, Montreal received more rain than Vancouver, British Columbia.

August 9, 2024 was the rainiest day in Montreal's history, with 145 mm (5.7 in) of rain falling on the downtown core as Hurricane Debby swept over the city.

Montreal is ranked 160 out of 190 world cities in the 2018 STC Climate index, a ranking of the best climates in which to live and work.

=== Sunshine ===
Montreal and the southern Quebec region receive slightly over 2,050 hours of sunshine annually, with summer being the sunniest season. The sunniest month is July with 272 hours, and the least sunny is December With November not too far off with around 80 hours for the two.

Montreal receives more sunshine than northern and northwestern Europe, even in locations at similar or even somewhat farther south latitudes, such as Toronto, especially during winter.

=== Precipitation ===
The city's average annual precipitation is 1,041 mm (41.0 in), including 818 mm (32.2 in) of rain and 217 cm (85 in) of snow.

As in the Northeastern U.S. and most of Southeastern Canada, precipitation is spread evenly throughout the year, with no wet or dry seasons. Montreal has 163 days annually with some rain or snow. Thunderstorms can occur any time between late spring and early autumn.

=== Statistics ===
Montréal–Trudeau Airport maximum records:

- Record high temperature of 37.8 °C (100.0 °F) recorded on August 1, 1975
- Record high daily minimum of 25.6 °C (78.1 °F) recorded on July 10, 1955
- Record high dew point of 26.7 °C (80.1 °F) recorded on August 31, 1958
- Most humid month with an average monthly dew point of 17.8 °C (64.0 °F) recorded during July 2023
- Warmest month with an average monthly mean temperature of 24.5 °C (76.1 °F) recorded during July 2018
  - Warmest monthly average daily maximum of 29.8 °C (85.6 °F) recorded during July 1955
  - Warmest monthly average daily minimum of 19.0 °C (66.2 °F) recorded during July 2020
  - July 2020 saw no daily maximum temperature below 24.9 °C (76.8 °F)
  - July 2020 saw no temperature below 14.7 °C (58.5 °F)
  - August 2015 saw no dew point below 10.2 °C (50.4 °F)

The lowest yearly maximum dew point is 21.5 °C (70.7 °F) recorded in 1985. The lowest yearly maximum daily minimum temperature is 19.0 °C (66.2 °F) recorded in 1985. The lowest yearly maximum temperature is 29.6 °C (85.3 °F) recorded in 1992, the only year where summer did not exceed 30.0 °C (86.0 °F) at Montréal–Trudeau Airport.

The average yearly maximum dew point is 23.6 °C (74.5 °F) and the average yearly maximum daily minimum temperature is 22.7 °C (72.9 °F) at Montréal–Trudeau Airport.

Montreal McGill recorded an additional higher record daily minimum of 26.1 °C (79.0 °F) recorded on July 1, 1878. Montreal McGill also recorded its warmest month in July 1921 with an average mean of 24.7 °C (76.5 °F), average daily maximum of 30.1 °C (86.2 °F), and average daily minimum of 19.3 °C (66.7 °F).

Climate data for Montreal (Montréal–Trudeau International Airport) WMO ID: 71627; coordinates 45°28′N 73°45′W; elevation: 36 m (118 ft); 1991−2020 normals, extremes 1941−present
Month	Jan	Feb	Mar	Apr	May	Jun	Jul	Aug	Sep	Oct	Nov	Dec	Year
Record high humidex	13.5	14.7	28.0	33.8	40.9	45.0	45.8	46.8	42.8	34.1	26	18.1	46.8
Record high °C (°F)	13.9 (57.0)	15.1 (59.2)	25.8 (78.4)	30.0 (86.0)	36.6 (97.9)	35.0 (95.0)	36.1 (97.0)	37.6 (99.7)	33.5 (92.3)	28.3 (82.9)	24.3 (75.7)	18.0 (64.4)	37.6 (99.7)
Mean maximum °C (°F)	7.1 (44.8)	6.7 (44.1)	13.5 (56.3)	23.3 (73.9)	29.3 (84.7)	31.4 (88.5)	32.4 (90.3)	31.5 (88.7)	29.4 (84.9)	23.2 (73.8)	17.0 (62.6)	10.0 (50.0)	33.2 (91.8)
Mean daily maximum °C (°F)	−5.0 (23.0)	−3.4 (25.9)	2.4 (36.3)	11.3 (52.3)	19.4 (66.9)	24.2 (75.6)	26.7 (80.1)	25.7 (78.3)	21.1 (70.0)	13.2 (55.8)	6.1 (43.0)	−1.2 (29.8)	11.7 (53.1)
Daily mean °C (°F)	−9.2 (15.4)	−8.0 (17.6)	−2.0 (28.4)	6.2 (43.2)	13.9 (57.0)	19.0 (66.2)	21.7 (71.1)	20.6 (69.1)	16.0 (60.8)	8.9 (48.0)	2.3 (36.1)	−5.0 (23.0)	7.0 (44.6)
Mean daily minimum °C (°F)	−13.5 (7.7)	−12.4 (9.7)	−6.5 (20.3)	1.1 (34.0)	8.3 (46.9)	13.8 (56.8)	16.7 (62.1)	15.6 (60.1)	10.9 (51.6)	4.5 (40.1)	−1.7 (28.9)	−8.7 (16.3)	2.3 (36.1)
Mean minimum °C (°F)	−25.3 (−13.5)	−22.6 (−8.7)	−18.2 (−0.8)	−6.3 (20.7)	1.2 (34.2)	6.8 (44.2)	11.2 (52.2)	9.1 (48.4)	3.4 (38.1)	−3.0 (26.6)	−10.4 (13.3)	−20.6 (−5.1)	−26.3 (−15.3)
Record low °C (°F)	−37.8 (−36.0)	−33.9 (−29.0)	−29.4 (−20.9)	−15.0 (5.0)	−4.4 (24.1)	0.0 (32.0)	6.1 (43.0)	3.3 (37.9)	−2.2 (28.0)	−7.2 (19.0)	−19.4 (−2.9)	−32.4 (−26.3)	−37.8 (−36.0)
Record low wind chill	−49.1	−46.0	−42.9	−26.3	−9.9	0.0	0.0	0.0	−4.8	−11.6	−30.7	−46.0	−49.1
Average precipitation mm (inches)	85.8 (3.38)	65.5 (2.58)	77.2 (3.04)	90.0 (3.54)	85.6 (3.37)	83.6 (3.29)	91.1 (3.59)	93.6 (3.69)	89.2 (3.51)	103.1 (4.06)	84.2 (3.31)	91.9 (3.62)	1,040.8 (40.98)
Average rainfall mm (inches)	32.8 (1.29)	16.9 (0.67)	37.3 (1.47)	74.9 (2.95)	85.6 (3.37)	83.6 (3.29)	91.2 (3.59)	93.6 (3.69)	89.2 (3.51)	101.6 (4.00)	67.4 (2.65)	44.2 (1.74)	818.3 (32.22)
Average snowfall cm (inches)	52.0 (20.5)	47.1 (18.5)	37.1 (14.6)	14.8 (5.8)	0.0 (0.0)	0.0 (0.0)	0.0 (0.0)	0.0 (0.0)	0.0 (0.0)	1.1 (0.4)	16.3 (6.4)	48.2 (19.0)	216.6 (85.3)
Average precipitation days (≥ 0.2 mm)	17.1	13.7	13.7	12.4	13.8	12.9	12.8	11.2	11.3	13.5	14.3	16.8	163.3
Average rainy days (≥ 0.2 mm)	4.5	3.8	7.0	11.4	13.7	12.9	12.8	11.2	11.3	13.2	11.1	6.7	119.6
Average snowy days (≥ 0.2 cm)	15.4	12.4	9.0	3.0	0.04	0.0	0.0	0.0	0.0	0.63	4.8	12.8	58.2
Average relative humidity (%) (at 1500 LST)	68.1	63.0	57.8	50.7	49.8	53.6	55.5	56.1	58.2	61.4	66.4	71.9	59.4
Average dew point °C (°F)	−13.0 (8.6)	−12.2 (10.0)	−7.6 (18.3)	−1.5 (29.3)	6.0 (42.8)	12.2 (54.0)	15.4 (59.7)	14.9 (58.8)	11.1 (52.0)	4.4 (39.9)	−1.8 (28.8)	−8.0 (17.6)	1.7 (35.1)
Mean monthly sunshine hours	101.2	127.8	164.3	178.3	228.9	240.3	271.5	246.3	182.2	143.5	83.6	83.6	2,051.3
Percentage possible sunshine	35.7	43.7	44.6	44.0	49.6	51.3	57.3	56.3	48.3	42.2	29.2	30.7	44.4
Average ultraviolet index	1	2	3	5	6	7	7	7	5	3	1	1	4
Source 1: Environment and Climate Change Canada (sun 1981–2010) (November maximum) (November humidex) and Weather Atlas (UV index)
Source 2: weatherstats.ca (for dewpoint and monthly/yearly average absolute maximum/minimum temperature)

Climate data for McGill University (McTavish) Climate ID: 7025280; coordinates 45°30′N 73°35′W; elevation: 56.9 m (187 ft); 1981−2010 normals, extremes 1871–present (Note: Extreme high and low temperatures in the table below are from Montreal McGill (July 1871 to March 1993) and McTavish (July 1994 to present).)
Month	Jan	Feb	Mar	Apr	May	Jun	Jul	Aug	Sep	Oct	Nov	Dec	Year
Record high °C (°F)	12.8 (55.0)	15.0 (59.0)	25.9 (78.6)	30.1 (86.2)	34.2 (93.6)	34.5 (94.1)	36.1 (97.0)	35.6 (96.1)	33.5 (92.3)	28.9 (84.0)	22.2 (72.0)	17.0 (62.6)	36.1 (97.0)
Mean daily maximum °C (°F)	−5.4 (22.3)	−3.7 (25.3)	2.4 (36.3)	11.0 (51.8)	19.0 (66.2)	23.7 (74.7)	26.6 (79.9)	24.8 (76.6)	19.4 (66.9)	12.3 (54.1)	5.1 (41.2)	−2.3 (27.9)	11.1 (52.0)
Daily mean °C (°F)	−8.9 (16.0)	−7.2 (19.0)	−1.2 (29.8)	7.0 (44.6)	14.5 (58.1)	19.3 (66.7)	22.3 (72.1)	20.8 (69.4)	15.7 (60.3)	9.2 (48.6)	2.5 (36.5)	−5.6 (21.9)	7.4 (45.3)
Mean daily minimum °C (°F)	−12.4 (9.7)	−10.6 (12.9)	−4.8 (23.4)	2.9 (37.2)	10.0 (50.0)	14.9 (58.8)	17.9 (64.2)	16.7 (62.1)	11.9 (53.4)	5.9 (42.6)	−0.2 (31.6)	−8.9 (16.0)	3.6 (38.5)
Record low °C (°F)	−33.5 (−28.3)	−33.3 (−27.9)	−28.9 (−20.0)	−17.8 (0.0)	−5.0 (23.0)	1.1 (34.0)	7.8 (46.0)	6.1 (43.0)	0.0 (32.0)	−7.2 (19.0)	−27.8 (−18.0)	−33.9 (−29.0)	−33.9 (−29.0)
Average precipitation mm (inches)	73.6 (2.90)	70.9 (2.79)	80.2 (3.16)	76.9 (3.03)	86.5 (3.41)	87.5 (3.44)	106.2 (4.18)	100.6 (3.96)	100.8 (3.97)	84.3 (3.32)	93.6 (3.69)	101.5 (4.00)	1,062.5 (41.83)
Average rainfall mm (inches)	28.4 (1.12)	22.7 (0.89)	42.2 (1.66)	65.2 (2.57)	86.5 (3.41)	87.5 (3.44)	106.2 (4.18)	100.6 (3.96)	100.8 (3.97)	82.1 (3.23)	68.9 (2.71)	44.4 (1.75)	834.9 (32.87)
Average snowfall cm (inches)	45.9 (18.1)	46.6 (18.3)	36.8 (14.5)	11.8 (4.6)	0.4 (0.2)	0.0 (0.0)	0.0 (0.0)	0.0 (0.0)	0.0 (0.0)	2.2 (0.9)	24.9 (9.8)	57.8 (22.8)	226.2 (89.1)
Average precipitation days (≥ 0.2 mm)	15.8	12.8	13.6	12.5	12.9	13.8	12.3	13.4	12.7	13.1	15.0	16.2	163.9
Average rainy days (≥ 0.2 mm)	4.3	4.0	7.4	10.9	12.8	13.8	12.3	13.4	12.7	12.7	11.5	6.5	122.2
Average snowy days (≥ 0.2 cm)	13.6	11.1	8.3	3.0	0.14	0.0	0.0	0.0	0.0	0.62	5.3	12.0	53.9
Mean monthly sunshine hours	99.2	119.5	158.8	181.7	229.8	250.1	271.6	230.7	174.1	138.6	80.4	80.7	2,015.2
Source: Environment and Climate Change Canada

Climate data for Mirabel (Montréal–Mirabel International Airport) Climate ID: 6153300; coordinates 45°40′N 74°02′W; elevation: 82.6 m (271 ft); 1981–2010 normals, extremes 1975–2008
Month	Jan	Feb	Mar	Apr	May	Jun	Jul	Aug	Sep	Oct	Nov	Dec	Year
Record high humidex	12.5	12.3	21.7	34.2	39.4	45.5	45.5	45.4	40.2	32.7	22.9	18.6	45.5
Record high °C (°F)	12.0 (53.6)	12.6 (54.7)	21.8 (71.2)	31.1 (88.0)	31.4 (88.5)	33.5 (92.3)	33.6 (92.5)	36.1 (97.0)	33.3 (91.9)	26.7 (80.1)	19.8 (67.6)	16.4 (61.5)	36.1 (97.0)
Mean daily maximum °C (°F)	−6.5 (20.3)	−4.3 (24.3)	1.3 (34.3)	10.8 (51.4)	18.5 (65.3)	23.4 (74.1)	25.7 (78.3)	24.7 (76.5)	19.9 (67.8)	12.5 (54.5)	4.7 (40.5)	−2.7 (27.1)	10.7 (51.3)
Daily mean °C (°F)	−11.5 (11.3)	−9.5 (14.9)	−3.6 (25.5)	5.4 (41.7)	12.4 (54.3)	17.4 (63.3)	19.8 (67.6)	18.7 (65.7)	14.1 (57.4)	7.3 (45.1)	0.6 (33.1)	−7.1 (19.2)	5.3 (41.5)
Mean daily minimum °C (°F)	−16.5 (2.3)	−14.8 (5.4)	−8.5 (16.7)	0.0 (32.0)	6.3 (43.3)	11.4 (52.5)	14.0 (57.2)	12.7 (54.9)	8.1 (46.6)	2.0 (35.6)	−3.4 (25.9)	−11.5 (11.3)	0.0 (32.0)
Record low °C (°F)	−37.0 (−34.6)	−33.1 (−27.6)	−29.9 (−21.8)	−15.4 (4.3)	−3.9 (25.0)	−0.9 (30.4)	4.8 (40.6)	1.1 (34.0)	−5.3 (22.5)	−8.0 (17.6)	−22.1 (−7.8)	−33.0 (−27.4)	−37.0 (−34.6)
Record low wind chill	−50.0	−44.0	−40.0	−24.0	−10.0	−3.0	0.0	0.0	−7.0	−12.0	−28.0	−46.0	−50.0
Average precipitation mm (inches)	87.9 (3.46)	64.6 (2.54)	70.4 (2.77)	88.0 (3.46)	86.8 (3.42)	103.1 (4.06)	91.9 (3.62)	96.0 (3.78)	91.7 (3.61)	96.5 (3.80)	103.2 (4.06)	87.6 (3.45)	1,067.7 (42.04)
Average rainfall mm (inches)	32.0 (1.26)	21.8 (0.86)	30.7 (1.21)	72.9 (2.87)	86.5 (3.41)	103.1 (4.06)	91.9 (3.62)	95.9 (3.78)	91.7 (3.61)	93.1 (3.67)	80.4 (3.17)	36.0 (1.42)	835.9 (32.91)
Average snowfall cm (inches)	55.8 (22.0)	43.1 (17.0)	38.5 (15.2)	14.0 (5.5)	0.3 (0.1)	0.0 (0.0)	0.0 (0.0)	0.0 (0.0)	0.0 (0.0)	3.1 (1.2)	22.8 (9.0)	51.3 (20.2)	228.8 (90.1)
Average precipitation days (≥ 0.2 mm)	16.8	14.0	13.8	13.0	13.7	13.2	12.7	12.0	11.4	13.8	16.1	17.1	167.5
Average rainy days (≥ 0.2 mm)	4.4	3.9	6.4	11.2	13.7	13.2	12.7	12.0	11.4	13.4	11.5	5.9	119.6
Average snowy days (≥ 0.2 cm)	15.2	12.1	9.9	4.0	0.2	0.0	0.0	0.0	0.0	1.1	6.8	14.0	63.3
Average relative humidity (%)	66.0	61.3	58.0	50.9	51.0	56.2	58.3	58.9	60.7	61.5	68.9	71.3	60.2
Source: Environment and Climate Change Canada
