= List of events in Quebec City =

The following is a list of events that take place in Quebec City.

== Festivals and events ==
=== Downtown festivals ===
- Festival d'été de Québec (Le) is a major event which is presented annually during two weeks in July. A large number of musical performances (popular, French-speaking and English-speaking, music of the world, classical music) are presented outdoors. They are usually followed by various artistic performances scattered around downtown.
- ComediHa! Fest-Québec (Le) is a comedy festival, which takes place for twelve days in August. Outdoor shows and indoor events are performed by local comedians as well as international professionals from around the world.
- Fête nationale des Québécois et des Québécoises is celebrated with various activities including a large outdoor evening show on June 23 on the Plains of Abraham. A crowd of over 200,000 fill up the streets of downtown Quebec City in a festive and violence-free manner.
- Fête du Canada (La) is celebrated on June 30 and July 1 at various locations in Old Québec with shows, special activities and free admission to the national historic sites of the city.
- Fête du Faubourg (La) is a street fair that takes place in the Saint–Jean–Baptist district in the first borough (La Cité) during a full weekend at the beginning of July every year.
- Fêtes de la Nouvelle-France (Les) is a week-long major event in August during which various activities allow visitors to relive the 17th Century, a time when the Nouvelle France was at its peak. Old Québec and Place Royale are vividly animated during the festival, such as: processions, shows, animation, presentation of the day-to-day life of the period, Nouvelle-France outdoor market, dressed-up observers and citizens, and costumed actors.

=== Festivals by the time of year ===
==== Autumn (September & October) ====
- Envol et macadam is both a contest and a festival of alternative music held annually in September. It is devoted to the latest musical trends (Punk, Hip-hop, Techno, Rock n Roll) and features indoor and outdoor shows.
- Fête du quartier Saint-Sauveur is celebrated annually in September in the First District.
- Festival des journées d'Afrique, Danses et Rythmes du monde is held in September, featuring African and Latin American shows.
- Fête Arc-en-ciel is a gay and lesbian festival held in September.
- Quebec City Celtic Festival is a celebration of Scottish, Irish and Breton roots including shows, workshops and conferences. It is held in early September.
- Québec City Film Festival premieres the most important movies from Quebec, and showcases many never seen before in Quebec City international movies from all around the world.
- Journées de la Culture (Les) offers free cultural events in September.
- Québec Ateliers Ouverts is held every two years in September. Professional artists and craftsmen open their workshops to the general public to showcase their works and techniques.

==== Winter (November to March) ====
- Carnaval de Québec (Le) is the biggest winter carnival in the world, held over two weeks in February.
- Quebec International Pee-Wee Hockey Tournament youth ice hockey event held annually in February.
- St-Patrick Parade has returned since 2010.
- Coup de cœur Francophone (Le) is a festival of Francophone music held in November each year in eight Canadian cities. In Quebec City, the event is held over ten days in small venues.
- Festival des musiques sacrées de Québec (Le) is held in November and features sacred music from various nations and time periods.
- Parade des jouets (La) is an interactive parade of mascots and floats held in November by city firefighters to collect toys and gifts for local underprivileged children.
- Mois Multi (Le) features electronic, new media and multidisciplinary art exhibits, held annually in February.
- Quebec Celebrates Christmas is held in December and January, features activities and exhibits throughout Quebec City.

==== Spring (April & May) ====
- Carrefour international de théâtre de Québec (even years) and the Théâtres d'ailleurs Festival (odd years) are held in May or June.
- Festival de la gastronomie du Québec – Coupe des Nations (Le), held in November, features competitions in culinary arts and wine making.
- Festival des modes de vie alternatif de Quebec takes place the long weekend in May and celebrates diversity in alternative lifestyles such as Burlesque, Fetish, BDSM, Gothic, Cyberpunk, Cosplay and many others. Conferences, workshops, performances, live music, fashion shows, socials, BDSM Play parties, fetish fair and exhibitors.
- Salon International du Livre de Québec (Le) takes place in April and features French literature and comic strips from Québec.
- Salon de l'Amour et de la Séduction (Le) takes place in April and features stage shows, seminars, a dungeon area, and exhibitors.
- Festival Nadeshicon - Japanese culture festival Takes place in April and features culture, animation and Japanese manga. Main activities: masquerade, Japanese fashion show, lectures, calligraphy, screenings, etc.

==== Summer (June to August) ====
- 400th Birthday of Quebec City: Major demonstrations took place all summer in 2008 to mark the 400th anniversary of the founding of the city (not an annually recurring festival).
- Quebec City Summer Festival is a ten-day festival held at the beginning of July, with dozens of stages and musical shows of all genres.
- Fetes de la Nouvelle France is a celebration in early August held in remembrance of the early French colonial times.
- Plein art is an arts and crafts exhibition.
- Québec City International Festival of Military Bands is a celebration of military music held in August.

== Contests ==
- Concours de musique du Canada (Le) was established in Quebec and caters to young Canadian musicians under 25 (under 30 for singers) aspiring to compete at the international level in various disciplines.
