= History of Quebec French =

History of the language

Quebec French is different in pronunciation and vocabulary to the French of Europe and that of France's Second Empire colonies in Africa and Asia.

Similar divergences took place in the Portuguese, Spanish and English language of the Americas with respect to European dialects, but in the case of French the separation was increased by the reduction of cultural contacts with France after the 1763 Treaty of Paris in which France ceded Canada to Great Britain.

Although pronunciations like moé and toé are today stigmatized (joual), they were the pronunciations of Early Modern French that were used by the kings of France, the aristocracy and the common people in many provinces of France. After the French Revolution, the standard pronunciation in France changed to that of the bourgeois class in Paris, but Quebec retained some pronunciations and expressions shared with modern Oïl languages such as Norman, Gallo, Breton, Picard, Poitevin and Saintongeais. Speakers of those languages of France predominated among the settlers of New France. Thus, they spoke a popular language that was largely shared with Paris, but they had their own habits, words and pronunciations that were not known in Paris which are now part of everyday language in Quebec.

Quebec French was also influenced by the French spoken by the King's Daughters, who were of the petit-bourgeois class from the Paris area (Île-de-France) as well as Normandy.

Thus, the 18th-century bourgeois Parisian French eventually became the national, standardized language of France after the French Revolution, but the French of the Ancien Régime kept evolving on its own in Canada. Indeed, the French spoken in Canada is closer idiomatically and phonetically to Belgian French, despite their independent evolution and the relatively small number of Belgian immigrants to Quebec (although it is to be remembered that the influence of the Walloon language in Belgium has influenced the language in the same way as the presence of the Oïl speakers in Quebec).

There is also the undeniable fact that Canadian-French speakers have lived alongside and among English speakers ever since the beginning of British administration, in 1763. Thus, anglicisms in Quebec French tend to be longstanding and part of a gradual, natural process of borrowing, but the unrelated anglicisms in European French are nearly all much more recent and sometimes driven by fads and fashions.

Some people (for instance, Léandre Bergeron, author of the Dictionnaire de la langue québécoise) have referred to Quebec French as la langue québécoise (the Québécois language); most speakers, however, would reject or even take offence to the idea that they do not speak French.

== New France ==
The French language established itself permanently in North America with the foundation of Quebec City by Samuel de Champlain in 1608. However, it was after the creation of the Sovereign Council of New France in 1663 that the colonies really started to develop.

Between 1627 and 1663, a few thousand colonists landed in New France, either in Acadia or Canada. The provinces that contributed the most to these migrations were those in the northern and western regions of France. The migrants came from Normandy, Picardy, Aunis, Aquitaine, Perche, Brittany, Paris and Île-de-France, Poitou, Maine, Saintonge, and Anjou, most of those being regions where French was seldom spoken at the time (see article Languages of France). According to Philippe Barbaud, the first colonists were therefore mostly non-francophone except for the immigrants from the Paris area, who most likely spoke a popular form of French; and the following dialect clash (choc des patois) brought about the linguistic unification of Quebec. Among the speakers of Norman, Picard, Aunis, Poitevin and Saintongeais and the Celtic language Breton, many might have understood French as a second language. Gradually, a linguistic transfer towards French occurred, leading to the linguistic unification of all the ethnic groups coming from France.

According to Henri Wittmann, the overwhelming similarities between the different varieties of Colonial French clearly show that the linguistic unity triggering dialect clash occurred before the colonists exported their French into the colonies of the 17th and 18th centuries; and that the koiné-forming dialect clash must have occurred in Paris and other related urban centers of France.

In any event, according to contemporary sources, the Canadians were all speaking French natively by the end of the 17th century, long before France itself outside its large urban centers.

== British regime ==
On September 13, 1759, Quebec City, then the political capital of New France, was taken by the British Army. New France fell a year later. According to the terms of 1760 Articles of Capitulation of Montreal, the French Army was to leave the conquered territory. The ruling elite (French nobles and leading merchants) also left. Ordinary people, the Roman Catholic clergy, lesser merchants, and some members of the civil administration, the majority having been born in Canada, stayed in the country. Those who stayed were to become British subjects. Soon, British General Jeffery Amherst, 1st Baron Amherst, established a military government, which was to last until 1763.

The military occupation led to the establishment of a provisional administration. Because the fate of the country was still uncertain, no political actions were really undertaken to transform, and the status quo prevailed. Because the population was unable to understand English, it was decided that ordinances would be published in French. To do so, numerous Canadians were permitted to participate in the administration of justice.

In 1763, France ceded Canada to Great Britain in the Treaty of Paris. Rapidly, the new ruling elite planned its future for the French-speaking colonists, who were to be absorbed into the English-speaking society of British North America, but they were to be allowed the right of Catholic worship under the terms of the treaty. On October 7, the British Royal Proclamation of 1763 set the new political conditions of Canada. The territory of the colony, renamed the Province of Quebec, was reduced to the inhabited area along the Saint Lawrence River.

James Murray was appointed governor and became responsible for enforcing the new policy concerning the colony. His tasks were to encourage British immigration; establish the official religion, Anglicanism; and the administrative and legal structures of England. Time brought the gradual establishment of anglophone British officials and colonists. Trade quickly passed on to British and British-American merchants, who migrated to Quebec City, Trois-Rivières, and Montreal.

French, until then the lingua franca in all aspects of social life, was quickly relegated to the second rank in trade and government. The educated classes began French-English bilingualism by necessity.

The Quebec Act of 1774 granted many of the requests of the Canadians, who had been petitioning the British crown for the restoration of French civil laws and guarantees as to the usage of their language and faith.

== See also ==
- Charter of the French Language
- Geographical distribution of French speakers
- History of French
- List of countries and territories where French is an official language
- Category:French-language mass media in Canada
