= Quebec French syntax =

There are increasing differences between the syntax used in spoken Quebec French and the syntax of other regional dialects of French. In French-speaking Canada, however, the characteristic differences of Quebec French syntax are not considered standard despite their high frequency in everyday, relaxed speech.

== Most common distinctive constructions ==
What follows are examples of the most common distinctive constructions in Quebec French syntax. For comparison, a standard French used throughout la Francophonie (including Quebec and francophone Canada) is given in parentheses with the corresponding English translation given afterwards in italics. Note that some of the following constructions can also be found in other regional dialects of French such as Acadian French and dialects in Western France.

One far-reaching difference is the weakening of the syntactic role of the specifiers (both verbal and nominal), which results in many syntactic changes:

- Positioning of the subject in an isolated syntagm at the beginning (or at the end) of the sentence, with pronouns integrated with the verbal particule (see pronouns below):

Mon frère, yé dans police. (Mon frère est dans la police.) My brother is in the police.
Y a l'air fâché, le chien. (Le chien a l'air fâché.) The dog looks angry.

- Increased presence of complex sentences with main or dependent clauses using demonstratives:

Mon rêve, c'est de partir en Afrique. (Mon rêve est de partir pour l'Afrique / en Afrique.) My dream is to leave for Africa.

- Relative clauses (1) using "que" as an all-purpose relative pronoun, or (2) embedding interrogative pronouns instead of relative pronouns:

(1) J'ai trouvé le document que j'ai besoin. (J'ai trouvé le document dont j'ai besoin.) I found / I've found the document (that) I need.
(2) Je comprends qu'est-ce que tu veux dire. (Je comprends ce que tu veux dire.) I understand what you mean.

- Loosening of the prepositions traditionally associated with certain verbs:

J'ai un enfant à m'occuper. (Standard correct French: s'occuper de; J'ai un enfant dont je dois m'occuper.) I have a child of which I must take care.

- Plural conditioned by semantics:

La plupart du monde sont tannés des taxes. (La plupart du monde est tanné des taxes.) Most people are fed up with taxes.

- The drop of the double negative (a feature observed throughout Francophonie) is accompanied by a change of word order(1), and (2)postcliticisation of direct pronouns (3)along with non-standard liaisons to avoid vowel hiatus:

(1) Donne-moé lé maintenant. (Donne-le-moi maintenant.) Give it to me now.
(2) Dis-moé pas de m'en aller! (Ne me dis pas de m'en aller) Don't tell me to go away.
(3) Donne-moi-z-en pas ! (Ne m'en donne pas!) Don't give me any!

Other notable syntactic changes in Quebec French include the following:

- In colloquial speech, the verb être is often omitted between je and un(e), with a t inserted: J't'un gars patient. A t is also often inserted after the second person singular: T'es-t-un gars patient.
- Use of non-standard verbal periphrasis:

J'étais pour te le dire. (J'allais te le dire. / J'étais sur le point de te le dire.) I was going/about to tell you about it.
Avoir su, j'aurais... (Si j'avais su, j'aurais...) Had I known, I would have...
J'étais après travailler quand ils sont arrivés. (J'étais en train de travailler quand ils sont arrivés.) I was working when they came.
M'as le faire. (Je vais le faire. / Je le ferai.); akin to "ahma" /ɑmə/ in Southern American English - I'm a do it. (I'm going to do it.)

- Particle "-tu" used (1) to form polar questions ((2) and sometimes to express exclamatative sentences):

C'est-tu loin, ça ? "Is it far?"
Y'en a-tu d'autres ? "Are there any others?"
Ça vous tente-tu vraiment d'y aller ? "Do you [formal or plural] really want to go?"
Faut-tu être cave pas à peu près ! "How very stupid [that other person] is [to do such a thing]"

Although this construction strikingly resembles a formal question asked in the 2nd person singular, there is no evidence that the particle tu came from the pronoun tu in the first place:

J'ai-tu l'air fatigué ? "Do I look tired?"

"Tu" is actually more likely to come from the 3rd person pronoun il with a euphonic -t-, as using a particle ti in exactly the same way is a feature found in the Oïl languages (other than French) in France and Belgium. Still, its use is often seen as a redundancy in a question for those who defend a standardized French. In such case, either "Tu" (but not both) can be eliminated to form less colloquial syntax.

Tu le veux-tu? (Le veux-tu? / Tu le veux?) "Do you want it?"

- Extensive use of litotes

C'est pas chaud! (C'est frais!) It's not that warm!
C'est pas laid pantoute! (Ce n'est pas laid du tout!) This is nice! (literally: This is not ugly at all).

== Pronouns ==
In daily use, Quebec French speakers frequently use a substantially different set of subjective pronouns in the nominative case from those traditionally used in standardized French:

je/ tu/ y [i], a/ on/ vous/ y [i] (instead of je/ tu/ il, elle/ nous/ vous/ il(s), elle(s))

with [a] → [ɛ] when used with the verb and copula être

- In common with the rest of the Francophonie, there is a shift from nous to on in all registers. In post-Quiet Revolution Quebec, the use of informal tu has become widespread in many situations that normally call for semantically singular vous. While some schools are trying to re-introduce this use of vous, which is absent from most youths' speech, the shift from nous to on goes relatively unnoticed.
- The traditional use of on, in turn, is usually replaced by different use of pronouns or paraphrases, like in the rest of the Francophonie. The second person (tu, té) is usually used by speakers when referring to experiences that can happen in one's life:

Quand té ben tranquille chez vous, à te mêler de tes affaires... When you're all alone at home, minding your own business...

Other paraphrases using le monde, les gens are more employed when referring to generalisations:

Le monde aime pas voyager dans un autobus plein. People don't like getting on a full bus.

- As in the rest of the Francophonie, the sound [l] is disappearing in il, ils among informal registers and rapid speech. More particular to Quebec is the transformation of elle to [a] and less often [ɛ] written a and è or 'est in eye dialect. See more in Quebec French phonology.
- Absence of elles - For a majority of Quebec French speakers, elles is not used for the 3rd person plural pronoun, at least in the nominative case; it is replaced with the subject pronoun ils[i] or the stress/tonic pronoun eux(-autres). However, elles is still used in other cases (ce sont elles qui vont payer le prix they [women] are going to pay the price).
- -autres In informal registers, the stress/tonic pronouns for the plural subject pronouns have the suffix –autres, pronounced [ou̯t] and written –aut’ in eye dialect. Nous-autres, vous-autres, and eux-autres are comparable to the Spanish forms nos(otros/as) and vos(otros/as), yet the usage and meanings are different. Note that elles-autres does not exist.

== Verbs ==
In their syntax and morphology, Quebec French verbs differ very little from the verbs of other regional dialects of French, both formal and informal. The distinctive characteristics of Quebec French verbs are restricted mainly to:

- Regularization

1. In the present indicative, the forms of aller (to go) are regularized as [vɔ] in all singular persons: je vas, tu vas, il/elle va. Note that in 17th century French, what is today's international standard /vɛ/ in je vais was considered substandard while je vas was the prestige form.
2. In the present subjunctive of aller, the root is regularized as all- /al/ for all persons. Examples: que j'alle, que tu alles, qu'ils allent, etc. The majority of French verbs, regardless of dialect or standardization, display the same regularization. They therefore use the same root for both the imperfect and the present subjunctive: que je finisse vs. je finissais.

3. Colloquially, in haïr (to hate), in the present indicative singular forms, the hiatus is found between two different vowels instead of at the onset of the verb's first syllable. This results in the forms: j'haïs, tu haïs, il/elle haït, written with a diaeresis and all pronounced with two syllables: /a.i/. The "h" in these forms is silent and does not indicate a hiatus; as a result, je elides with haïs forming j'haïs. All the other forms, tenses, and moods of haïr contain the same hiatus regardless of register. However, in Metropolitan French and in more formal Quebec French, especially in the media, the present indicative singular forms are pronounced as one syllable /ɛ/ and written without a diaraesis: je hais, tu hais, il/elle hait.

- Differentiation

1. In the present indicative of both formal and informal Quebec French, (s')asseoir (to sit/seat) only uses the vowel /wa/ in stressed roots and /e/ in unstressed roots: je m'assois, tu t'assois, il s'assoit, ils s'assoient but nous nous asseyons, vous vous asseyez. In Metropolitan French, stressed /wa/ and /je/ are in free variation as are unstressed /wa/ and /e/. Note that in informal Quebec French, (s')asseoir is often said as (s')assire.
2. Quebec French has retained the /ɛ/ ending for je/tu/il-elle/ils in the imperfect (the ending is written as -ais, -ait, -aient). In most other dialects, the ending is pronounced, instead, as a neutralized sound between /e/ and /ɛ/.
3. Informal ils jousent (they play) is often heard for ils jouent and is most likely due to an old analogy with ils cousent (they sew).

- Some expressions that take the subjunctive in standard French take the indicative in Quebec French, or vice versa (bien qu'il est trop tard rather than bien qu'il soit trop tard). This is mostly colloquial spoken usage, since written usage tends to follow the usage of France more closely.

== Number ==
On the other hand, many Quebecers in informal context will decide on the agreement with collective nouns based on semantics rather than morphology. That is to say, for instance, that a verb whose grammatical subject is le monde (people, folks) may appear in the 3rd person plural because le monde designates multiple people although it is singular: le monde là-dedans sont en train de chiâler (the people in there are complaining).
