= List of landforms of Quebec =

The following is a list of landforms in the Canadian province of Quebec. There are no glaciers in Quebec.

== Landforms ==
- Fjords of Quebec
- Mountains of Quebec
  - Laurentides
  - Appalaches
  - Monts Chic-Chocs
  - Collines Montérégiennes
  - Monts Torngat
- Volcanoes in Quebec
- Islands of Quebec
- Lakes of Quebec
- List of dams and reservoirs in Quebec
- Rivers of Quebec
  - Waterfalls of Quebec
- Valleys of Quebec
- World Heritage Sites in Quebec (2)
  - Miguasha National Park
  - Old Quebec
- Extreme points of Quebec
  - Borders of Quebec
- Other
  - Canadian Shield
  - St. Lawrence Lowlands
