= Politics of Montreal =

The politics of Montreal begins with residents of Montreal electing representatives to the municipal, provincial, and federal levels of government.

The Island of Montreal which consists of the City of Montreal and 16 independent municipalities, are represented by 18 Members of Parliament (MPs) and 27 Members of the National Assembly of Quebec (MNAs). Additionally, the Urban agglomeration of Montreal is composed of 16 mayors, 18 borough mayors, 144 city councillors and 38 borough councillors.

While people living in Greater Montreal are heavily divided on the issue of Quebec sovereignty, the majority of both groups tend to lean to the left of the political spectrum and thus centre-left parties dominate the city at all political levels.

== Federal politics ==
The island of Montreal elects 18 Members of Parliament to the House of Commons in Ottawa. Following the 2025 Canadian federal election the Liberal Party of Canada had 16 MPs, the New Democratic Party with 1 MP and the Bloc Québécois with 1 MP. The centre-right Conservative Party of Canada have not won a seat on the island since the 1988 election and are generally not competitive, with their worst results in Canada often coming in Montreal.

== Provincial politics ==
The island of Montreal is represented by 27 MNAs in the Quebec National Assembly. After the 2026 Quebec general election, this consisted of 19 Quebec Liberal Party MNAs, 6 Québec Solidaire MNAs, and 2 Parti Québécois MNAs.

== Municipal politics ==
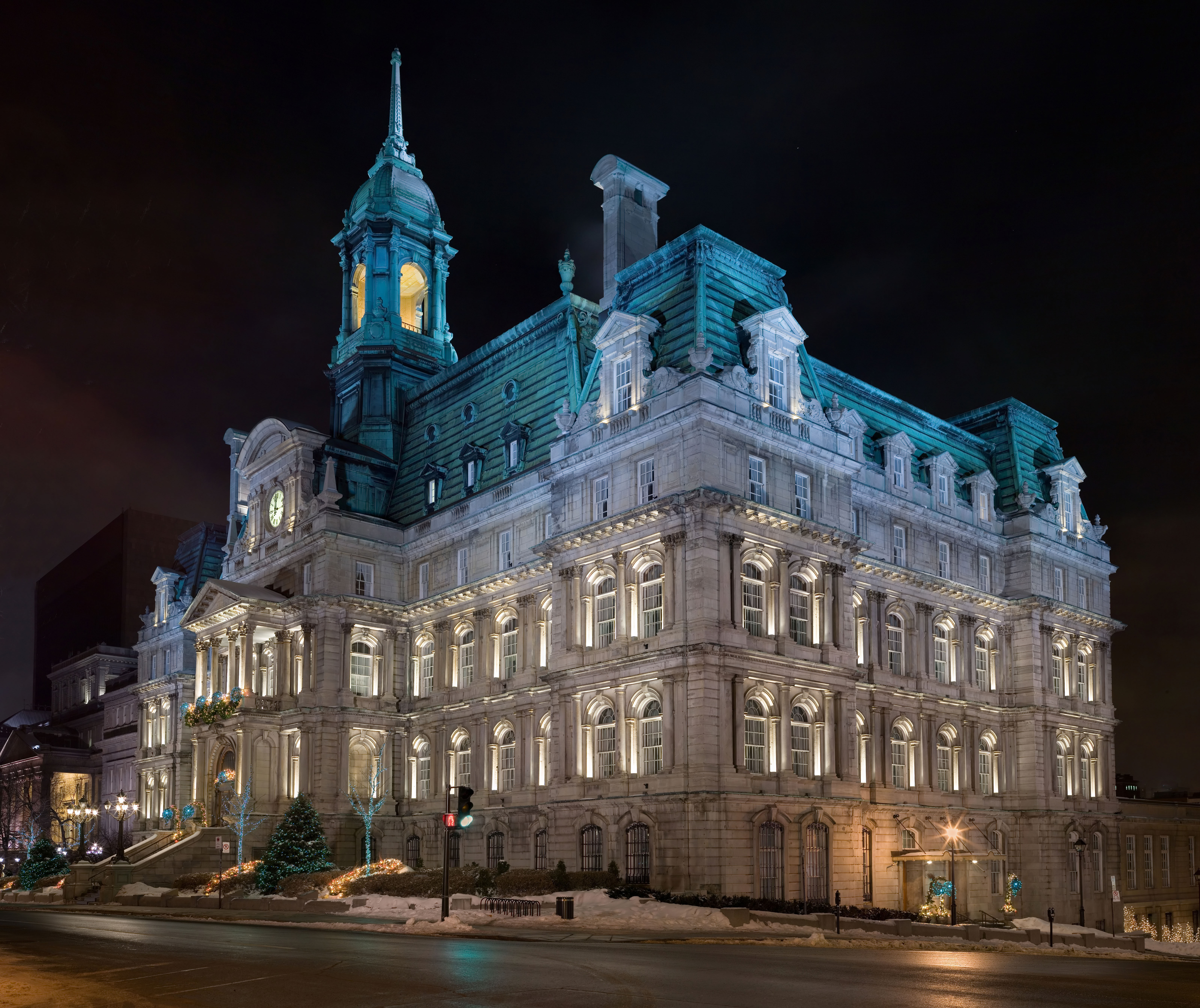
Montreal City Hall.

Montreal is unique among Canadian cities for its established municipal political parties. The major left-wing party is Projet Montréal, while the main center-right party is Ensemble Montréal. Additionally, several boroughs have their own borough-specific parties that run candidates exclusively within those areas.The City of Montreal is represented by 64 councillors and a mayor at the municipal level. As of the 2025 Montreal Municipal election, 34 of these councillors and the mayor are members of Ensemble Montréal, 25 are from Projet Montréal, 3 are from Équipe LaSalle, 2 are from Équipe Anjou, and 1 is from Équipe St-Léonard.
