= Order of precedence in Quebec =

Relative preeminence of officials for ceremonial purposes

The Quebec order of precedence is a nominal and symbolic hierarchy of important positions within the province of Quebec. It has no legal standing but is used to dictate ceremonial protocol at events of a provincial nature.

1. The King in Right of Quebec (His Majesty Charles III)
2. The Lieutenant Governor (Manon Jeannotte)
3. The Premier (Paul St-Pierre Plamondon, MNA)
4. The Cardinals followed, when not a cardinal, by the Roman Catholic Archbishop having the status of Primate
5. The President of the National Assembly
6. The Chief Justice of the Court of Appeal (Manon Savard)
7. The Vice-Premier
8. The Dean of the Diplomatic Corps and the heads of diplomatic missions
9. The Leader of the Opposition
10. The members of the Executive Council
11. The local Archbishop or Bishop followed by the representatives of other faith communities
12. The local Mayor
13. The Dean of the Consular Corps in Quebec City followed by the Dean of the Consular Corps in Montreal, the heads of post of the Consular Corps living in the capital, for events happening there, and other heads of post, governed by their respective precedence
14. The vice-presidents of the National Assembly
15. The chief justices of the Superior Court
16. The local member of the National Assembly followed by other members
17. The Secretary General of the Executive Council
18. The President of the Council of the National Order of Quebec
19. The chief justices of the Court of Quebec
20. The rectors/principals of the local universities
21. The judges of the Court of Appeal
22. The Principal Secretary to the Premier followed by the deputy ministers
23. The judges of the Superior Court
24. The Ombudsman, the Chief Electoral Officer, the Auditor General, the presidents of the Government Agencies and Crown Corporations and the Chief of Protocol
25. The judges of the Court of Quebec
26. The members of the National Order of Quebec
