= Urban agglomeration of Les Îles-de-la-Madeleine =

Coordinates: 47.3833°N 61.8667°W

The Communauté maritime des Îles-de-la-Madeleine (French pronunciation: [kɔmynote maʁitim dez‿il də la madlɛn]), commonly designated as the Agglomeration of Les Îles-de-la-Madeleine, is located on the islands of the Magdalen Islands archipelago, that bathes in the waters of the Gulf of St. Lawrence, 250 km from Gaspé, 120 km from Prince Edward Island, 90 km from Cape Breton Island and 150 km from Newfoundland. the municipality of Les Îles-de-la-Madeleine

== Municipalities ==
The urban agglomeration includes two municipalities.

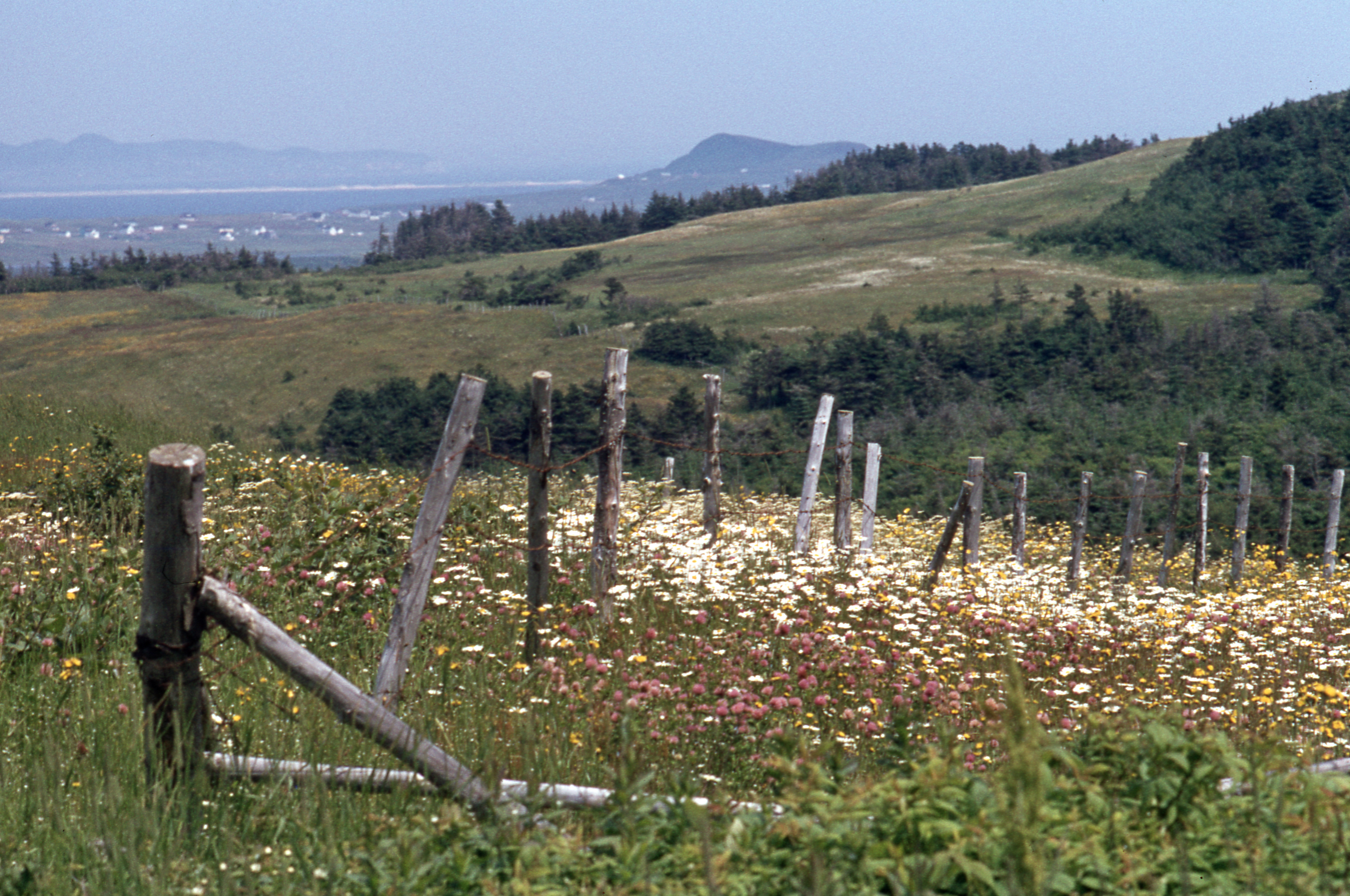
Fatima, Butte du Vent

1. Les Îles-de-la-Madeleine municipality, created in 2002 from the merger of the municipality of the village of Cap-aux-Meules and the municipalities of Fatima, Grande-Entrée, Havre-aux-Maisons, L'Étang-du-Nord and L'Île-du-Havre-Aubert.

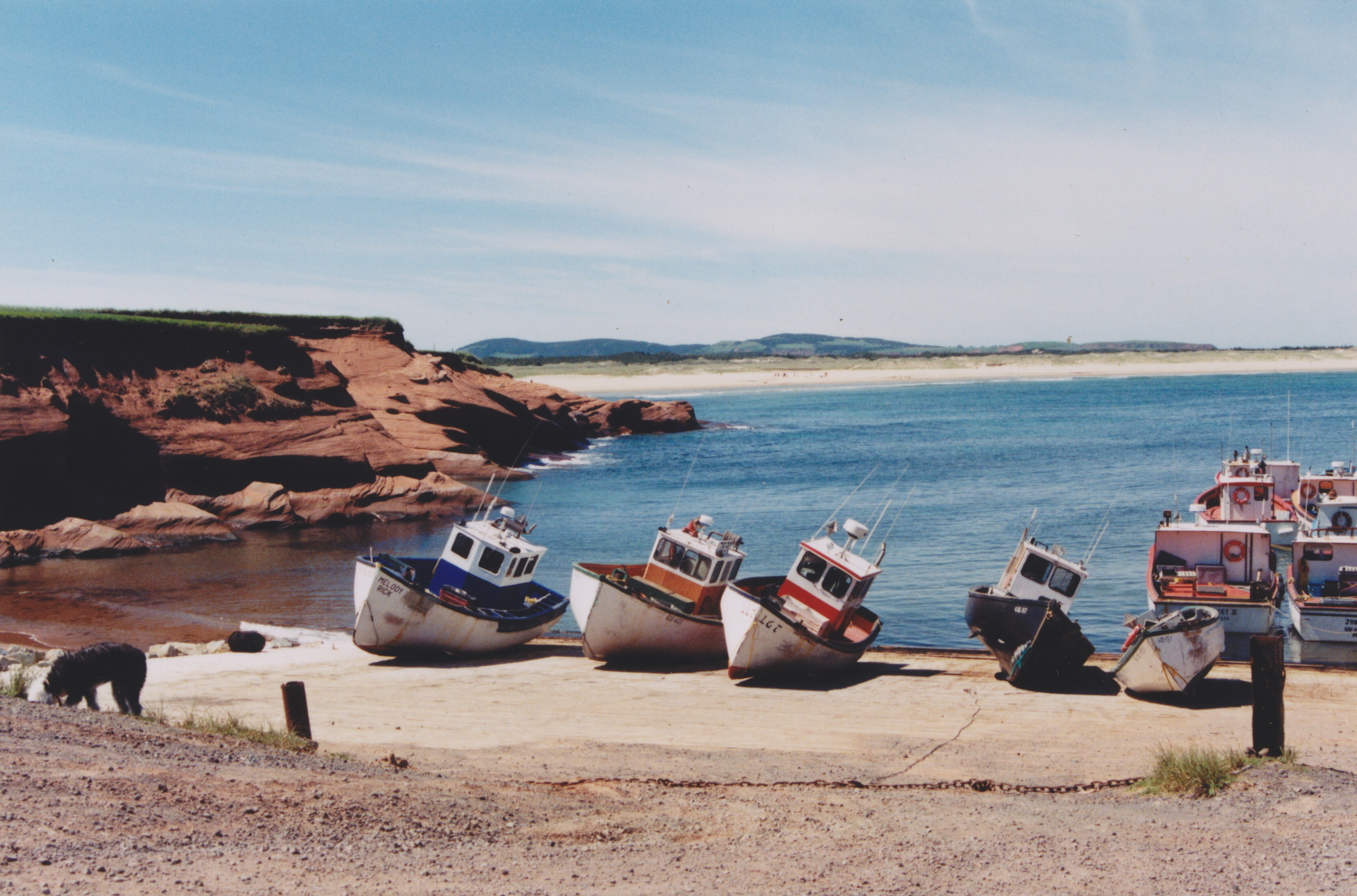
Grosse-Île municipality, Old-Harry (hamlet), in port, 5 boats pulled on the wood-covered beach (slips)

2. Grosse-Île municipality.

The English-speaking community uses the term Magdalen Islands Maritime Community.

== History ==
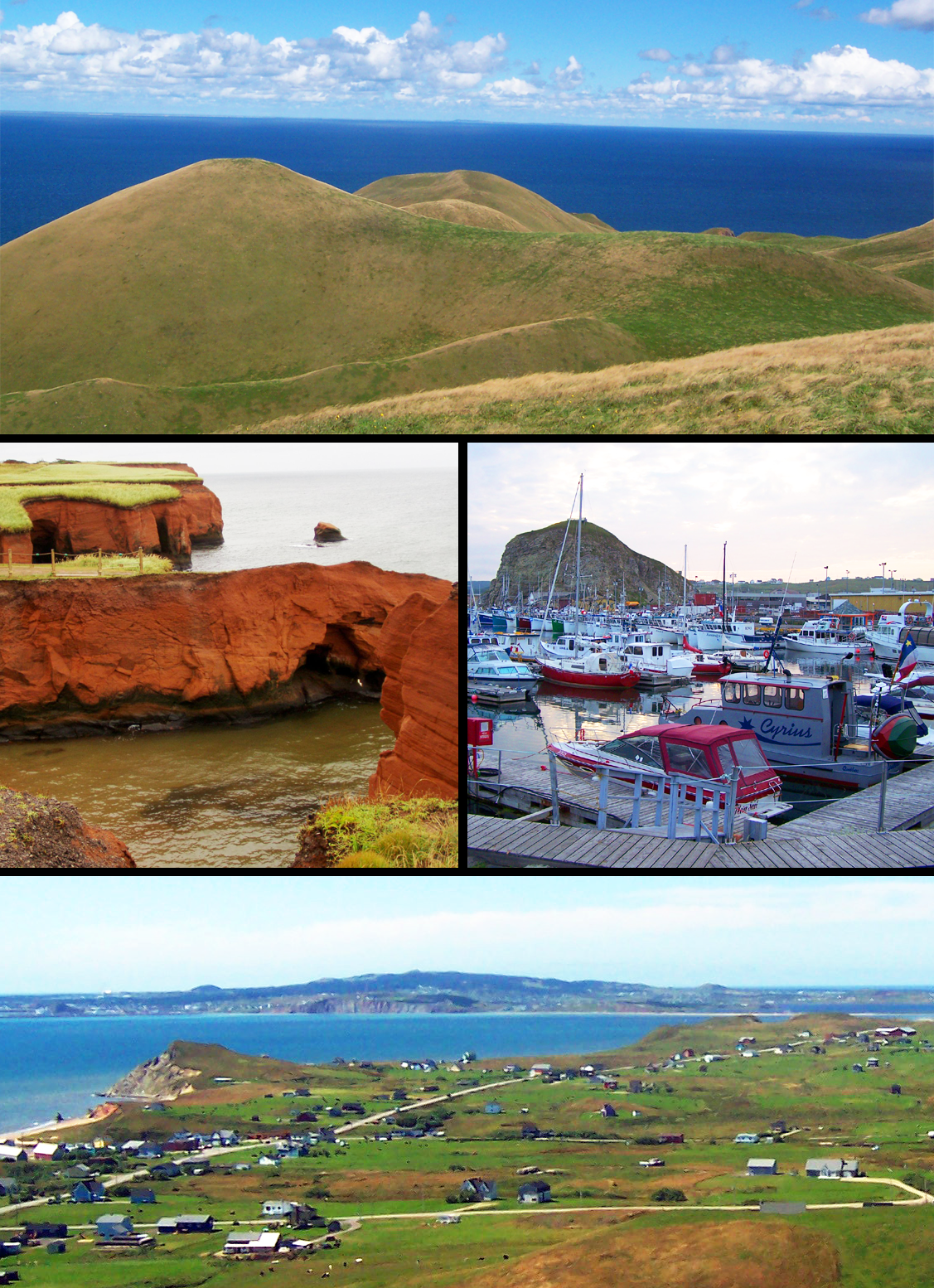
Municipality of Les Îles-de-la-Madeleine

As part of the 2000–2006 municipal reorganization in Quebec, the City of Les Îles-de-la-Madeleine was created on January 1, 2002 by the merger of the village municipality of Cap-aux-Meules and the municipalities of Fatima, Grande-Entrée, Grosse-Île, Havre-aux-Maisons, L'Étang-du-Nord, L'Île-du-Havre-Aubert. In a 2004 referendum both Cap-aux-Meules and Grosse-Île voted to de-merge, but in the end only Grosse-Île de-merged and became an independent municipality again on January 1, 2006.

However, the legislation governing the de-merger process provided for the creation of a new municipal structure, an urban agglomeration, which would continue to tie de-merged cities to their former partners for the provision of various municipal services. This provision was applied to join the municipalities of Les Îles-de-la-Madeleine and Grosse-Île into an agglomeration.

In 2016, the law Bill 83 allowed the agglomeration to be known under the name of Communauté maritime des Îles-de-la-Madeleine. This name is now generally used.

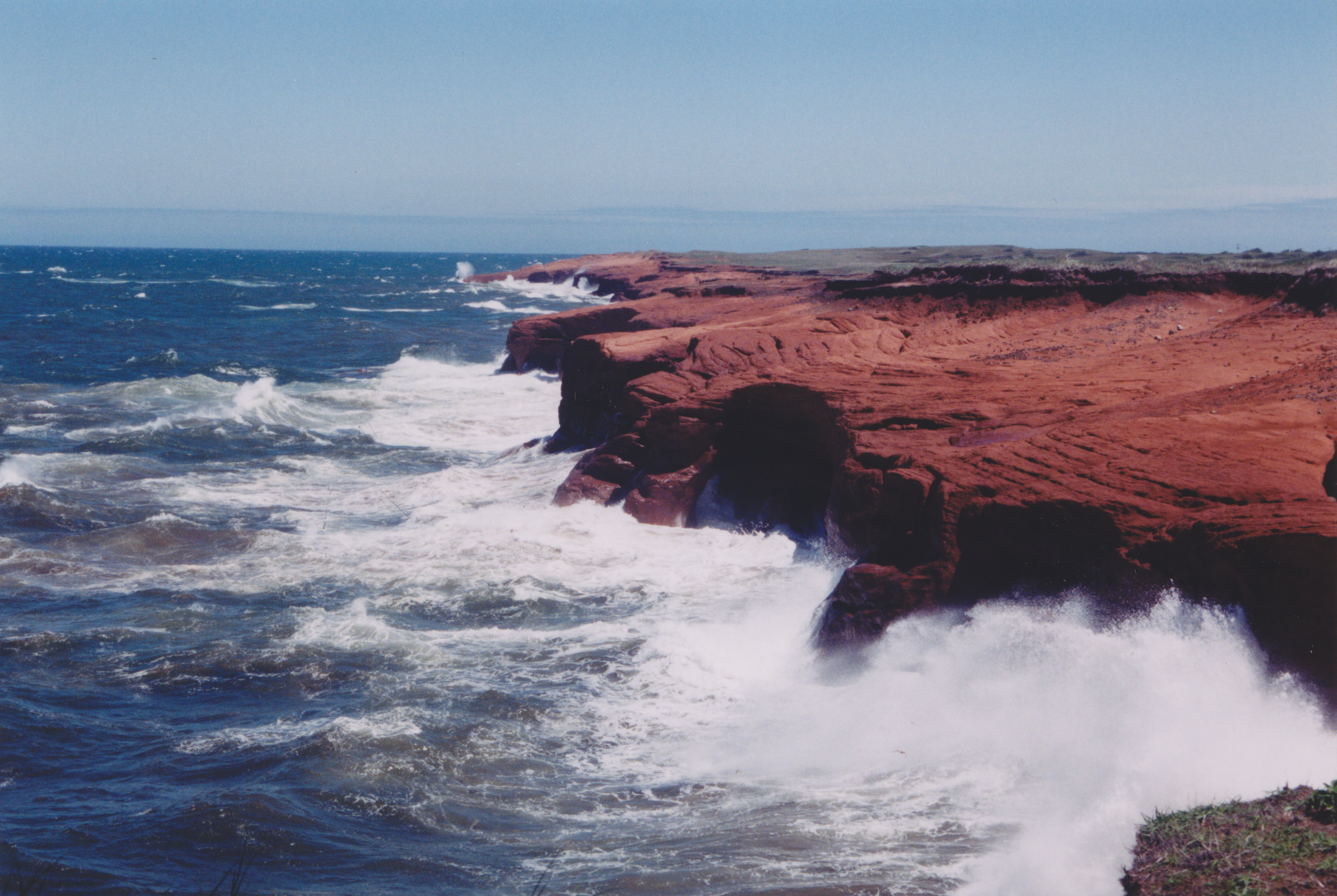
Cap-aux-Meules, between L'Étang-du-Nord and Fatima, a day of sea, storm tails, winds and rough seas

== See also ==
- Urban agglomerations in Quebec
- 21st-century municipal history of Quebec
