= Les Îles-de-la-Madeleine, Quebec =

Les Îles-de-la-Madeleine
- Municipality
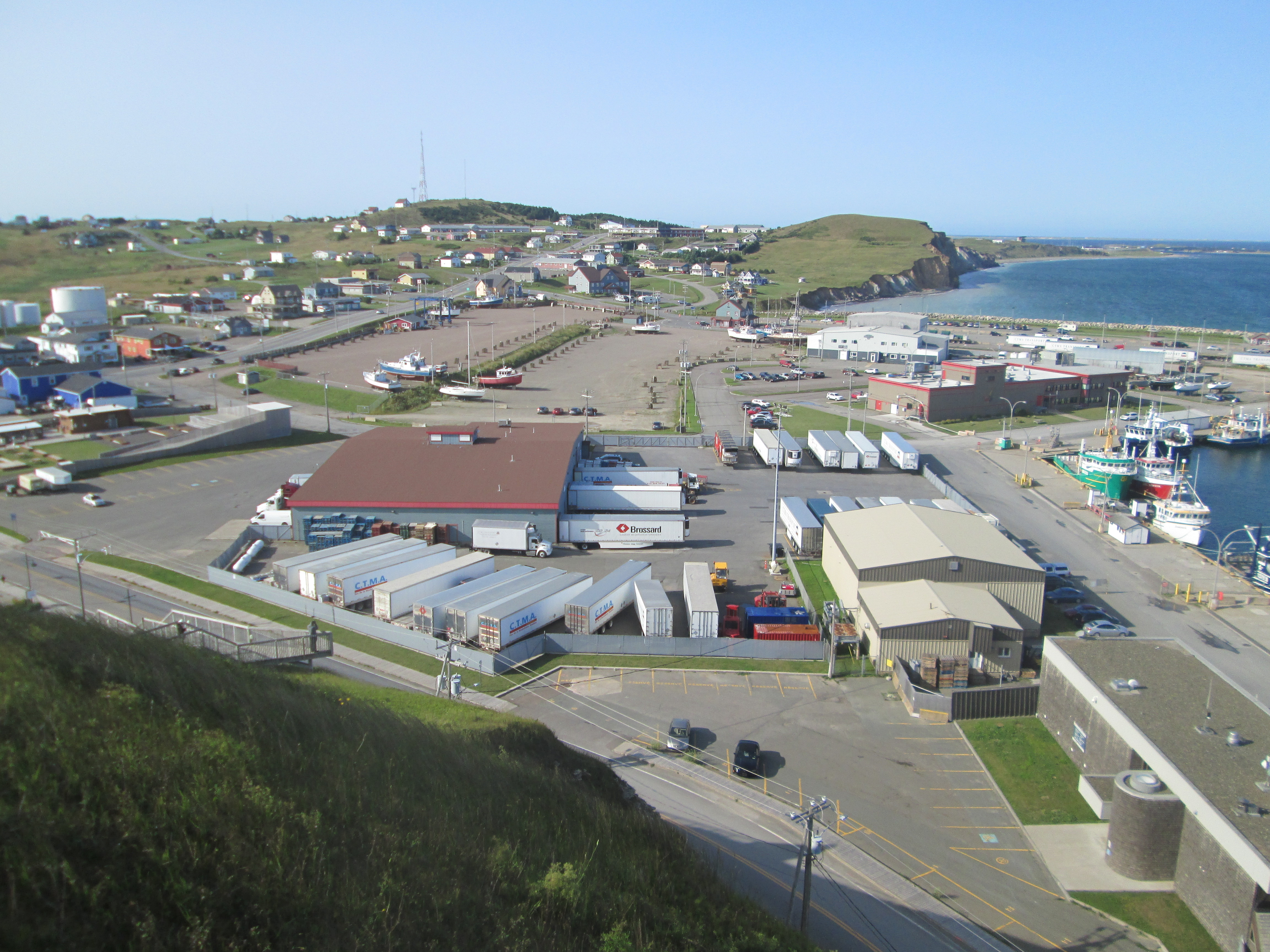
- Grindstone

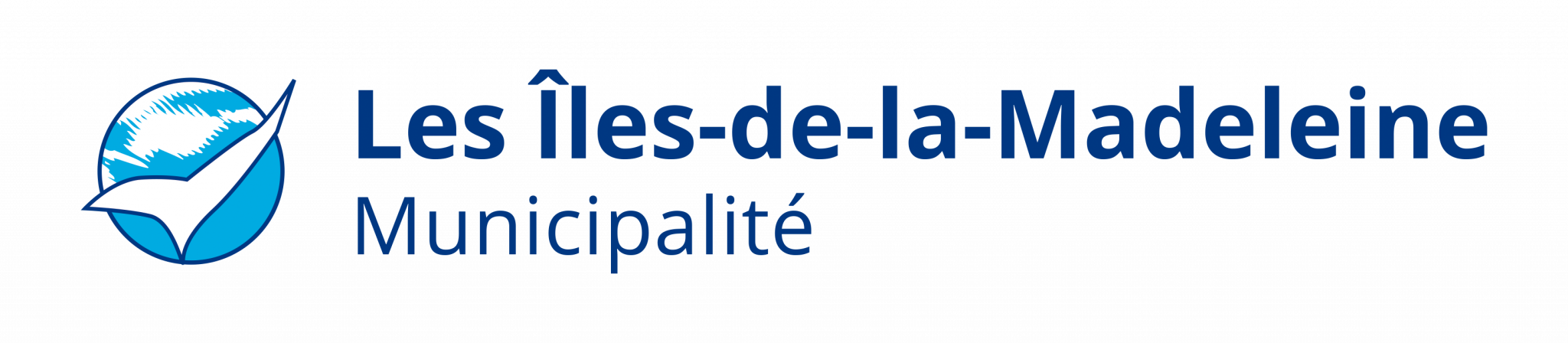
- Seal
- Motto(s): "Et si" (French for, "And If")
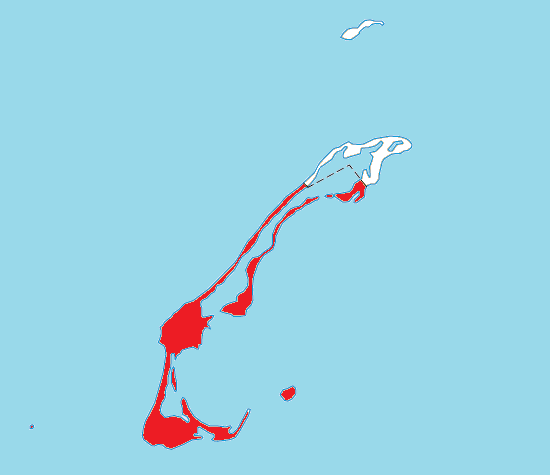
- Location within Les Îles-de-la-Madeleine TE.

- Location in eastern Quebec.
- Coordinates: 47°24′N 61°48′W
- Country: Canada
- Province: Quebec
- Region: Gaspésie–Îles-de-la-Madeleine
- RCM: None
- Agglomeration: Îles-de-la-Madeleine
- Constituted: January 1, 2002

Government
  - Mayor: Antonin Valiquette
  - Federal riding: Gaspésie—Les Îles-de-la-Madeleine—Listuguj
  - Prov. riding: Îles-de-la-Madeleine

Area
  - Total: 33,704.00 km^{2} (13,013.19 sq mi)
  - Land: 155.06 km^{2} (59.87 sq mi)

Population (2021)
  - Total: 12,190
  - Density: 78.6/km^{2} (204/sq mi)
  - Pop 2016-2021: ▲1.5%
  - Dwellings: 6,413
- Time zone: UTC−04:00 (AST)
  - Summer (DST): UTC−03:00 (ADT)
- Postal code(s): G4T 1A1
- Area codes: 418 and 581
- Highways: R-199
- Website: www.muniles.ca

Les Îles-de-la-Madeleine (French pronunciation: [lez‿il də la madlɛn]) is a municipality located in Gaspésie-Îles-de-la-Madeleine region, in Quebec, Canada. It is located on the islands of the Magdalen Islands archipelago, in the Gulf of St. Lawrence, 250 kilometres (130 nautical miles) from Gaspé, 120 km (65 nmi) from Prince Edward Island, 90 km (50 nmi) from Cape Breton Island, and 150 km (80 nmi) from Newfoundland.

== History ==
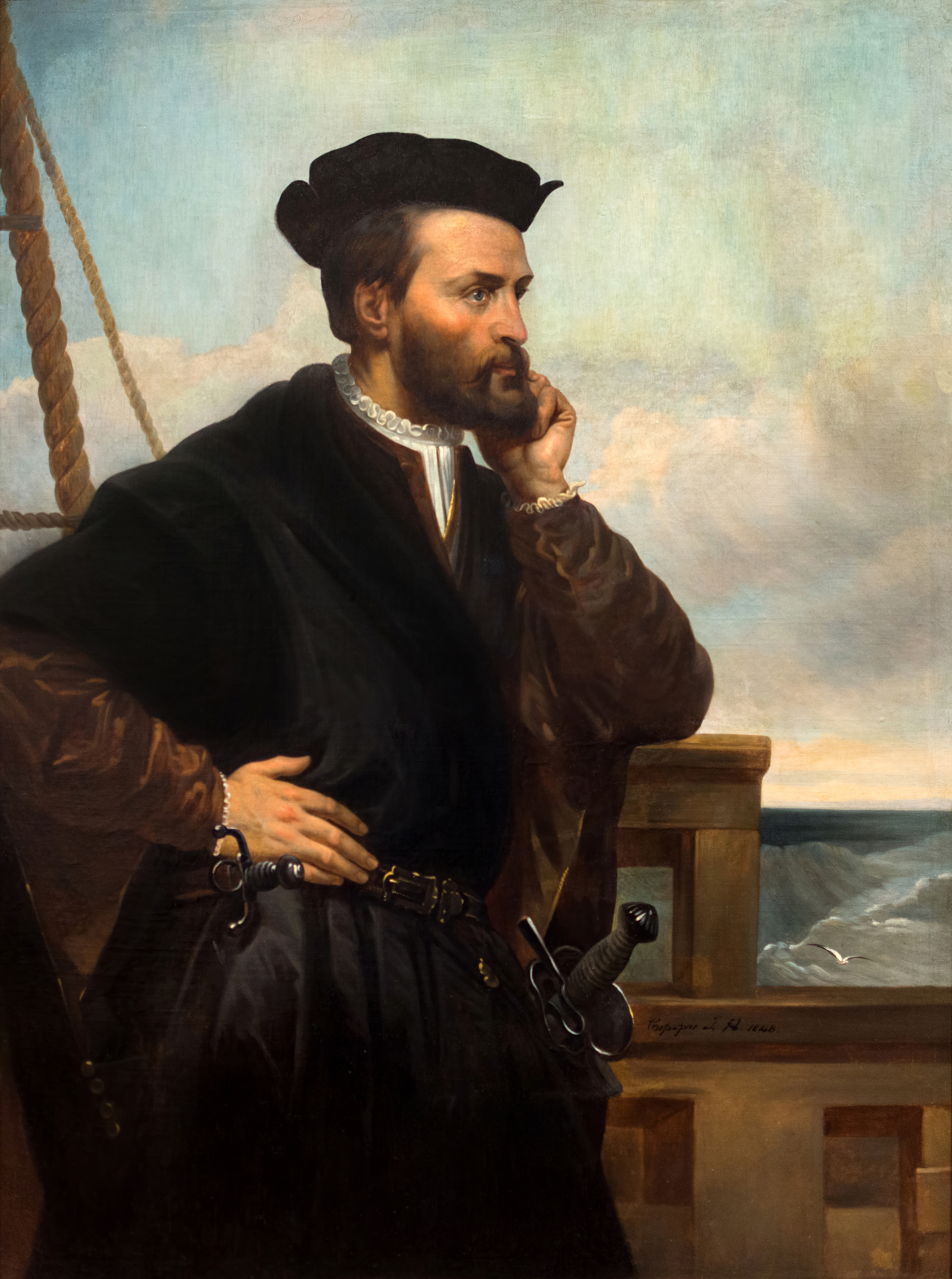
Jacques Cartier 1491–1557

The Mi'kmaq were among the original occupants of Atlantic Canada, inhabiting the coastal regions of the Gaspé Peninsula and The Maritimes east of the Saint John River. This traditional territory is called Mi'gma'gi (Mi'kma'ki).

According to Mi'kmaq oral history and archaeological evidence collected to date, there has been a seasonal First Nations presence on the Magdalen Islands for 6,000 to 10,000 years. This occupation was mainly for summer fishing and hunting of marine mammals or other game.

Explorer Jacques Cartier was the first known European to visit the islands in 1534.

The first concerted settlement attempt was made by English Brownist (a group of English Dissenters or separatists) Francis Johnson in 1597, which failed. François Doublet de Honfleur received the concession of the archipelago from the Company of One Hundred Associates (Compagnie des Cent-Associés), in 1663, he gave it its current name, in honour of his wife Madeleine Fontaine.

The first settlers to permanently inhabit the islands came after the fall of Louisbourg and the dispersal of the Acadians from the Grand-Pré region of Acadia.

Flag of Acadia

In 1765, the islands were inhabited by 22 French-speaking Acadians and their families. They worked for a British trader, Richard Gridley, and hunted walruses. Many inhabitants of Les Îles-de-la-Madeleine still fly the Acadian flag and identify as both Acadian and Québécois. The islands were administered as part of the British Colony of Newfoundland from 1763 to 1774, when they became part of the Province of Quebec (1763–1791) by the Quebec Act passed by the Parliament of Great Britain.

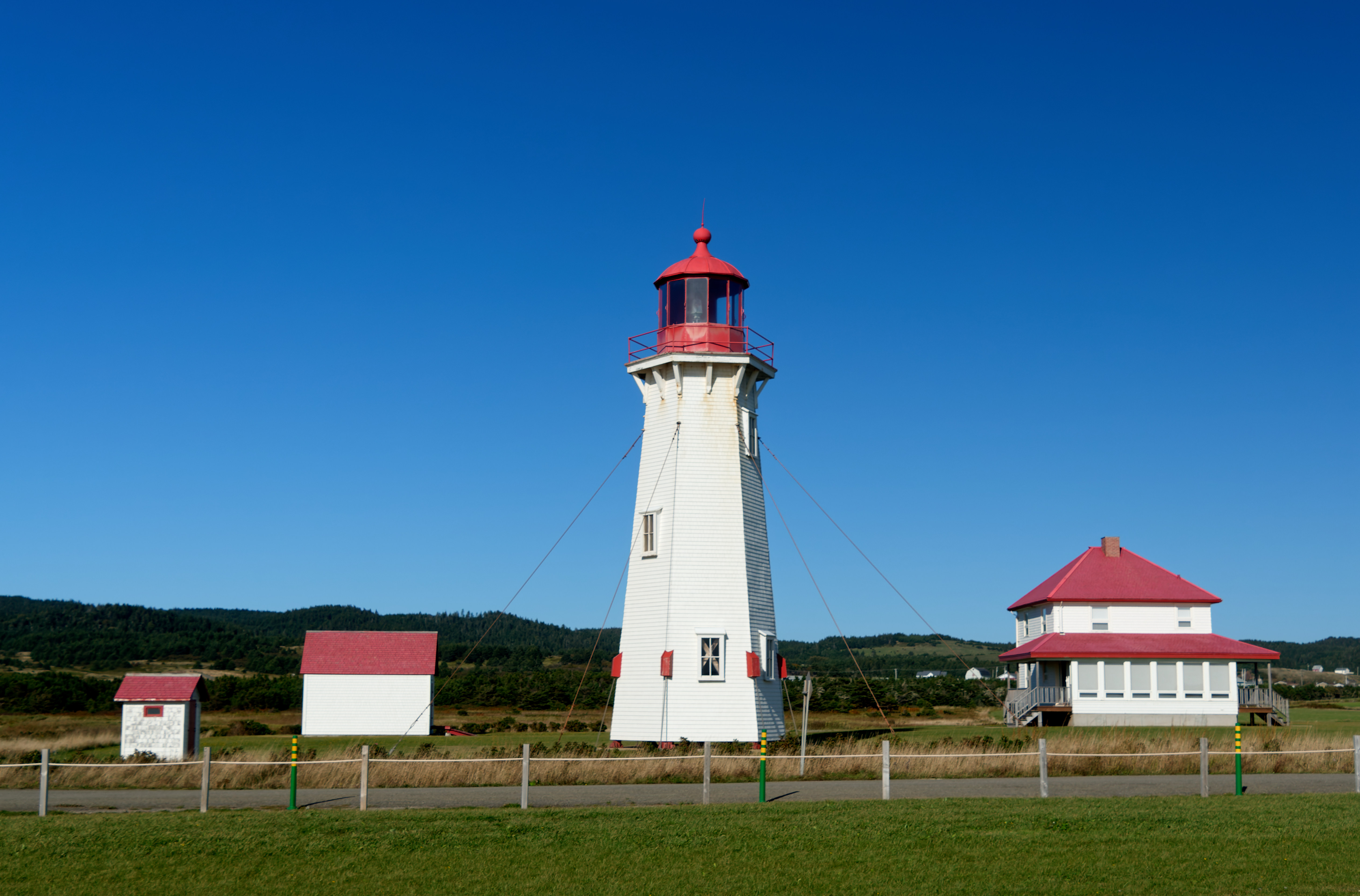
Anse-à-la-Cabane lighthouse, Havre Aubert Island

Some of the islanders are descendants of survivors of the more than 400 shipwrecks on the islands. Some of the historic houses were built using wood salvaged from the shipwrecks. To improve the safety of ships, the government constructed lighthouses on the islands. They indicate navigable channels and have reduced the number of shipwrecks, but many old hulks are found on the beaches and under the waters.

The islands have some of Quebec's oldest English-speaking settlements. Although most anglophones have long either assimilated with the francophone population or migrated elsewhere, English-speaking settlements can be found at Old Harry, a hamlet in Grosse-Île, and Entry Island.

Until the 20th century, the islands were completely isolated during the winter since the sea ice made the trip to the mainland impassable by boat. In August 1880, the Canadian Government's telegraphy service installed the first submarine cable that connected the islands with the mainland.

On January 6, 1910, this cable connecting the village of Old Harry, Magdalen Islands, to Sydney, Cape Breton Island, Nova Scotia, broke. On February 2, 1910, Magdalen Islanders, cut off from the rest of the world, threw into the sea a ponchon, which is a barrel containing the molasses. The wooden barrel was outfitted with a rudder and a sheet metal sail, on which the islanders had painted the inscription "Winter Magdalen Mail". The islanders placed letters in sealed tin cans within the barrel. Most letters were addressed to families on the continent, except one written for the person who would find the makeshift boat and another addressed to Rodolphe Lemieux, Member of Parliament for Gaspé and Postmaster General. The ponchon reached Halifax around February 14, 1910. A year later, the Government of Canada responded to the Magdalen Islanders' grievances and installed a wireless telegraphy system in the Islands.

== Geography ==
Created in 2002, the municipality of Les Îles-de-la-Madeleine is the result of the merger of multiple municipalities within the archipelago.

As part of a municipal reorganization across Quebec, the seven communities of the Magdalen Islands amalgamated to form the municipality of Les Îles-de-la-Madeleine on January 1, 2002. Grosse-Île has since regained its status as a separate municipality; the list below presents the six hamlets of Les Îles-de-la-Madeleine.

=== L'Étang-du-Nord ===
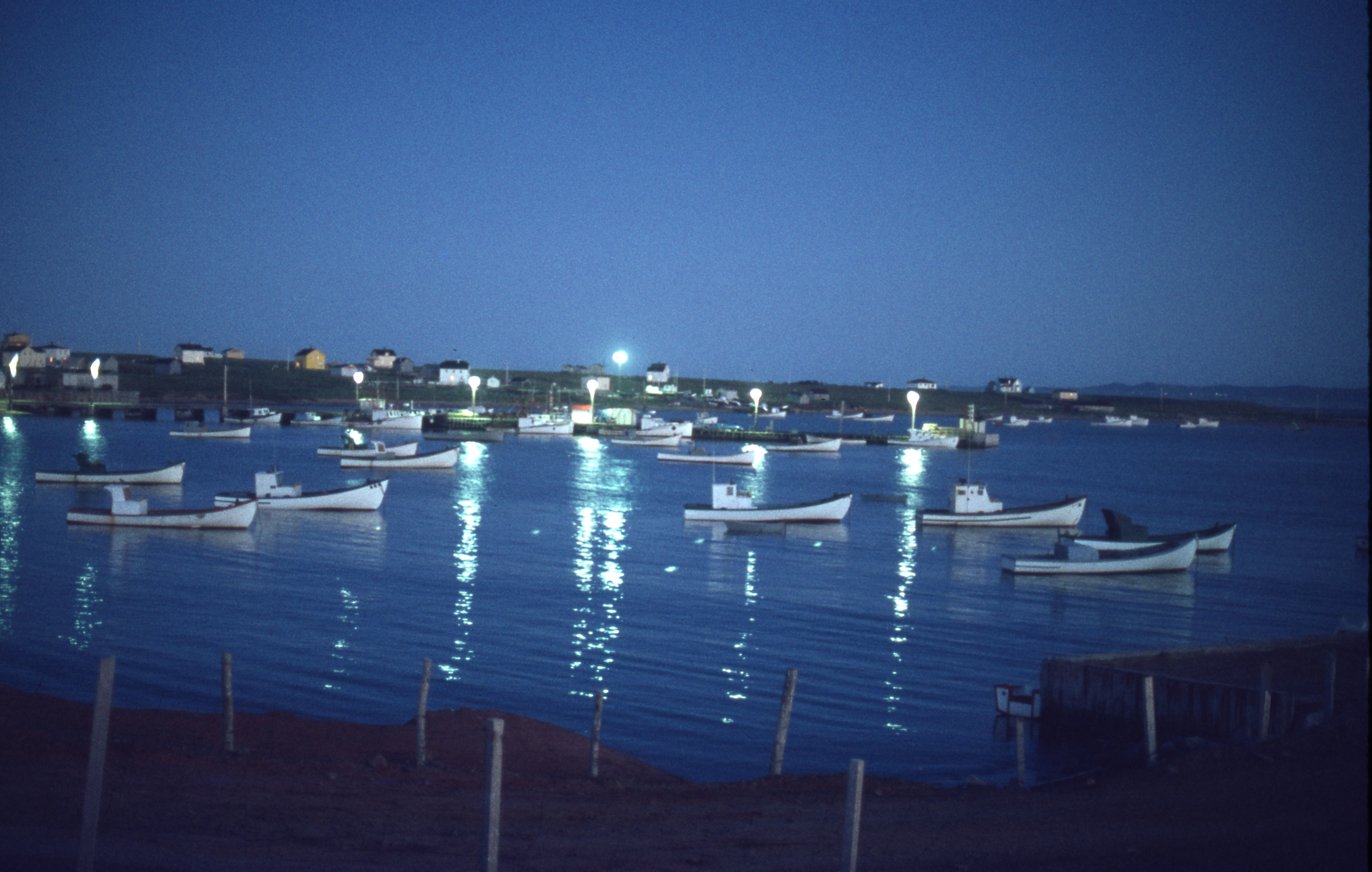
Fishing harbour, Anse de L'Étang-du-Nord (cove)

L'Étang-du-Nord is the main fishing centre of the Les Îles-de-la-Madeleine. The village received its first inhabitants around 1830 and was officially erected as a municipality in 1875. The community hosts a campus of Cégep de la Gaspésie et des Îles, which serves as the Magdalen Islands' only post-secondary institution.

=== Fatima ===
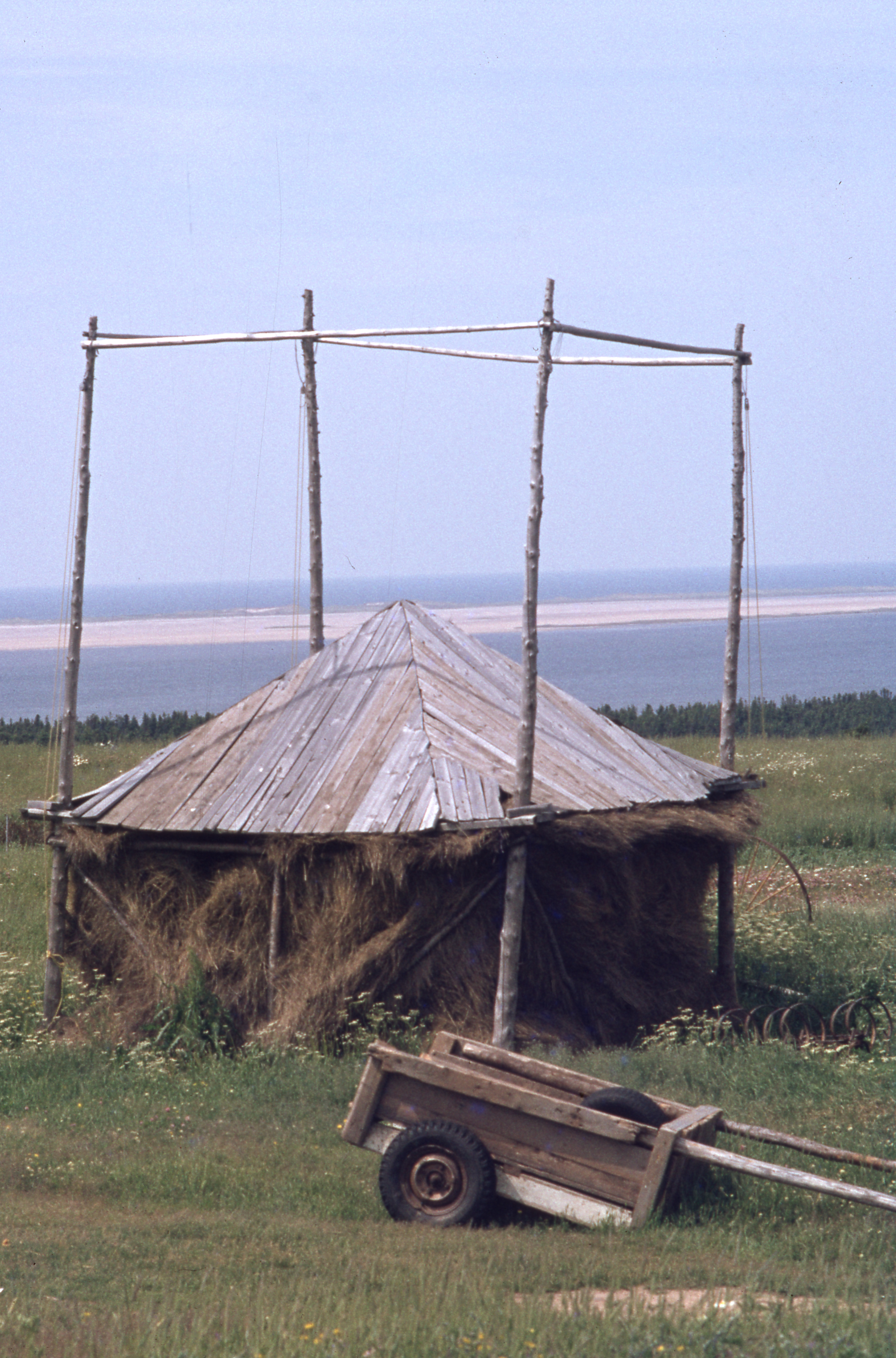
Hay barrack (Baraque à foin), Butte du Vent (Hill) 1978

Located on the island of Cap-aux-Meules, Fatima was settled between 1820 and 1845. It is named after Fátima in Portugal, a pilgrimage site highly visited after three young shepherds claimed the Holy Virgin appeared to them. As of 2006, its population was 2,809.

=== L’Île-du-Havre-Aubert ===
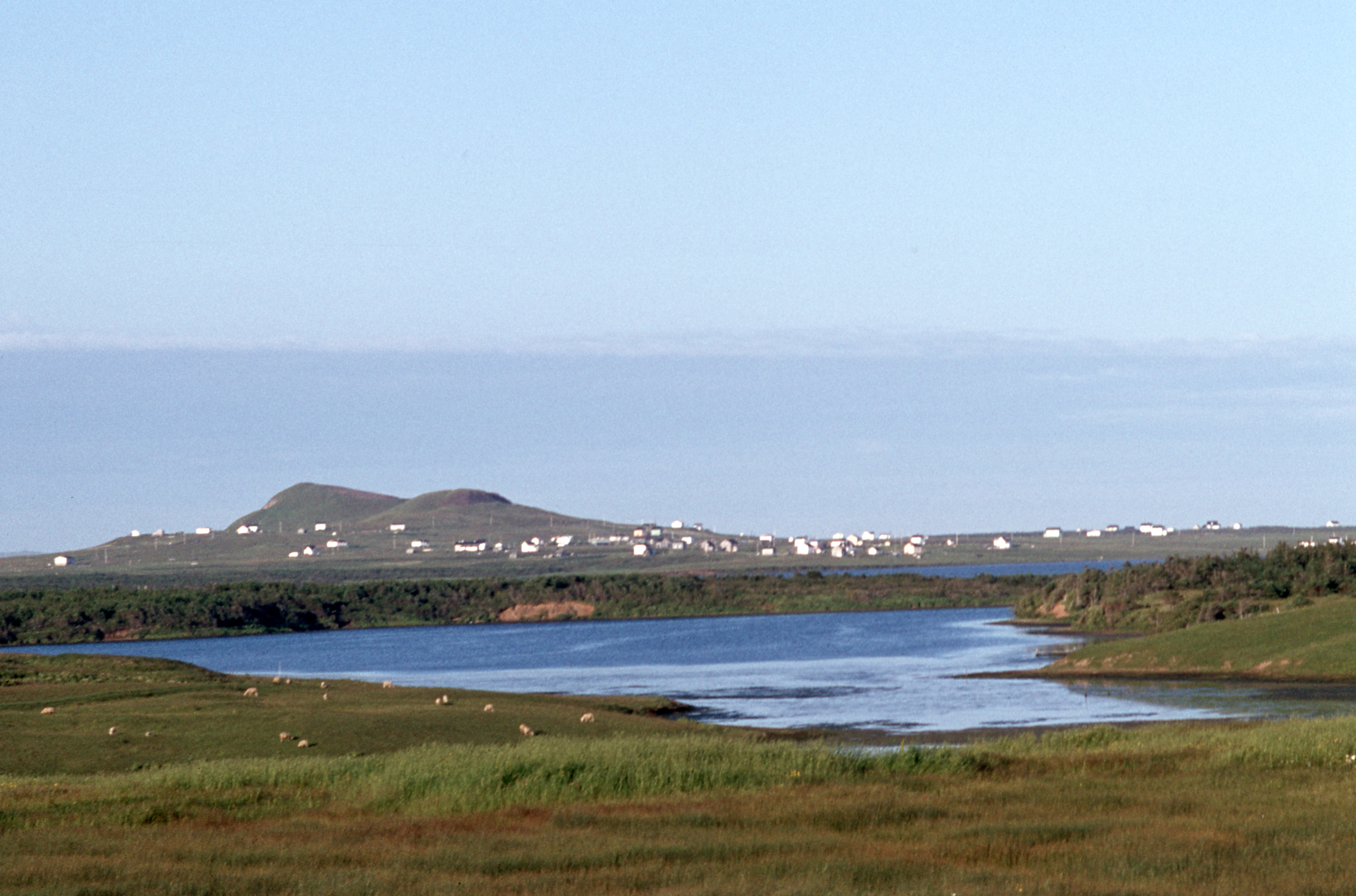
Buttes des Demoiselles (hills), houses, lagoon and cattle grazing in a salt meadow

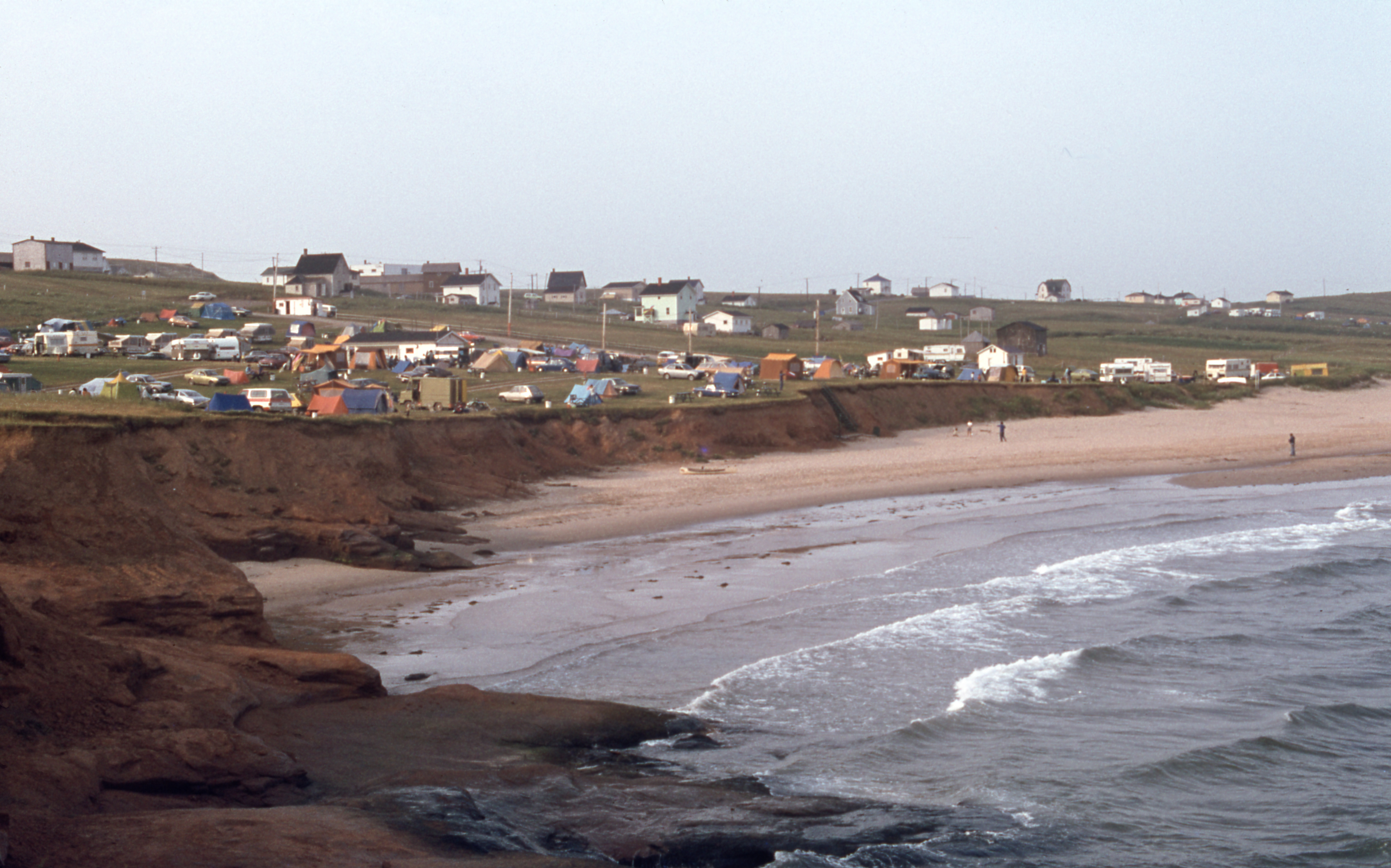
Anse du Bassin beach, campsite Plage du golfe, Bassin

The hamlet of L’Île-du-Havre-Aubert is made up of the island of Havre-Aubert and the island of L’ Île-d’Entrée.

=== Havre-aux-Maisons ===
Havre-aux-Maisons, located on the island of Havre aux Maisons, was first settled in 1765 from Acadia.

Îles-de-la-Madeleine Airport, Magdalen Islands' only port of entry by air, is located on Havre-aux-Maisons.

=== Cap-aux-Meules ===
Cap-aux-Meules is the largest commercial and fishing port in the archipelago.

=== Grande-Entrée ===
Grande-Entrée is located on Grande Entrée Island, aptly named as the hamlet is made up of two capes which, between their arms, form a bay where boats can enter .

== Demography ==
=== Population ===
Canada census – Les Îles-de-la-Madeleine community profile

	2021	2016	2011
Population	12,190 (+1.5% from 2016)	12,010 (-2.3% from 2011)	12,291 (-2.1% from 2006)
Land area	155.06 km^{2} (59.87 sq mi)	172.71 km^{2} (66.68 sq mi)	168.11 km^{2} (64.91 sq mi)
Population density	78.6/km^{2} (204/sq mi)	69.5/km^{2} (180/sq mi)	73.1/km^{2} (189/sq mi)
Median age	54.8 (M: 54.4, F: 54.8)	52.2 (M: 52.1, F: 52.4)	48.3 (M: 48.0, F: 48.6)
Private dwellings	6,413 (total) 5,610 (occupied)	6,223 (total)	5,924 (total)
Median household income	$75,000	$61,029	$52,220

Notes: Municipality created on January 1, 2002.
References: 2021 2016 2011

Historical census data - Les Îles-de-la-Madeleine, Quebec

Year	Pop.	±%
2006	12,560	—
2011	12,291	−2.1%

Year	Pop.	±%
2016	12,010	−2.3%
2021	12,190	+1.5%

=== Language ===
Les Îles-de-la-Madeleine is primarily home to French speakers, whose distinct dialect is heavily influenced by Acadian, as well as Quebec French and English.

However, the proportion of Anglophones has never exceeded 3%

Canada census mother tongue - Les Îles-de-la-Madeleine, Quebec
Census	Total	French			English			French & English			Other		
Year	Responses	Count	Trend	Pop %	Count	Trend	Pop %	Count	Trend	Pop %	Count	Trend	Pop %
2021	12,075	11,720	▲1.2%	97.1%	245	▲2.1%	2.0%	70	▲133.3%	0.6%	35	0.0%	0.3%
2016	11,890	11,585	▼2.2%	97.4%	240	▼11.1%	2.0%	30	▼14.3%	0.3%	35	▲40.0%	0.3%
2011	12,180	11,850	▼1.3%	97.3%	270	▼16.9%	2.2%	35	▼30.0%	0.3%	25	▼61.5%	0.2%
2006	12,445	12,005	n/a	96.5%	325	n/a	2.6%	50	n/a	0.4%	65	n/a	0.5%

== Attractions ==
La Grave heritage site includes buildings with a variety of functions: general store, salt works, tinsmith's shop, fishing tackle store, fish sales counter, small warehouses and scaffolds.

== Infrastructure ==
=== Transport ===
==== Sea ====
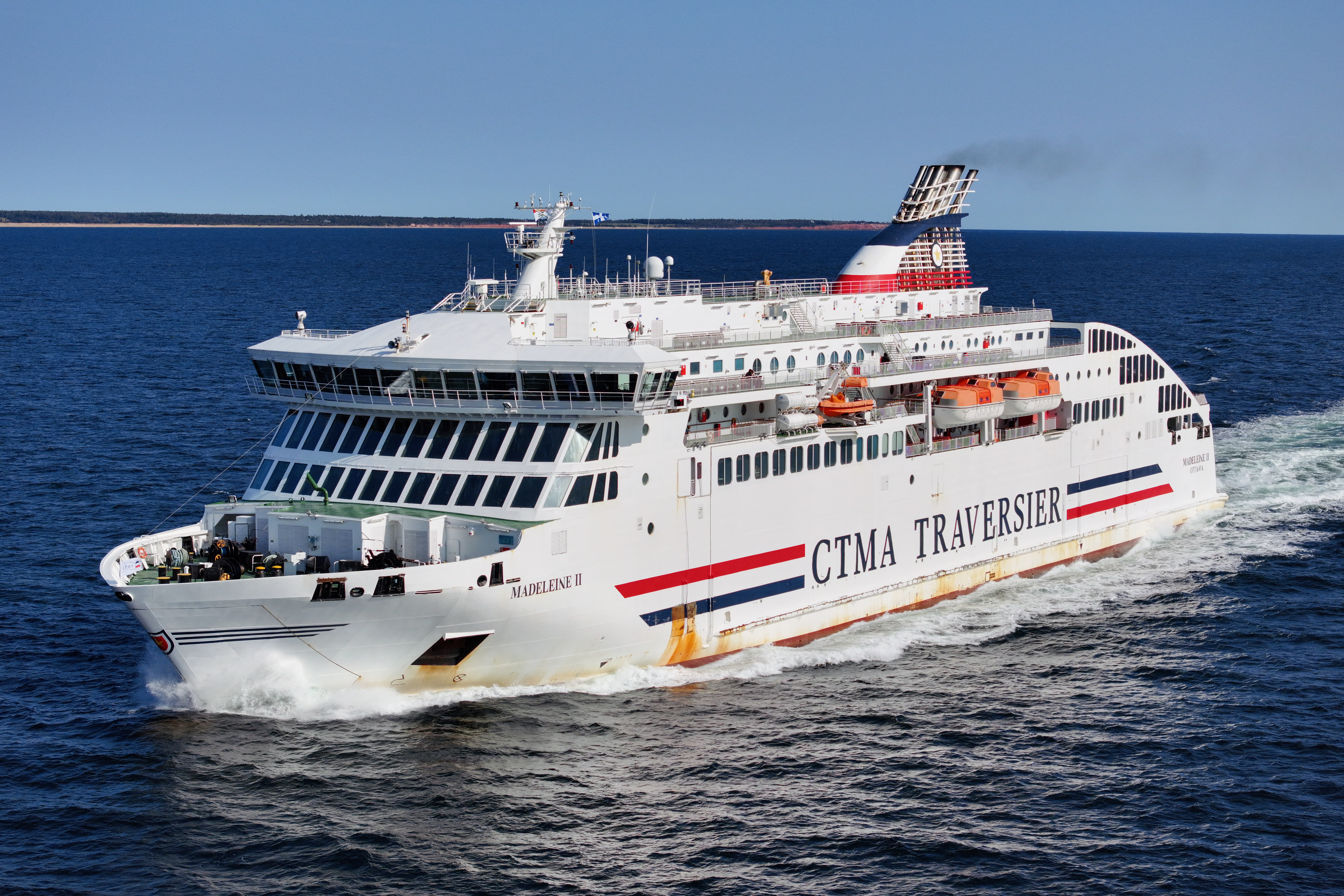
MV Madeleine II, arriving at Souris PEI 2025

The Coopérative de Transport Maritime et Aérien (Groupe C.T.M.A.) operates a ferry service between terminals in Souris, Prince Edward Island, and Cap-aux-Meules.

The Société des traversiers du Québec (STQ), under an agreement with Coopérative de Transport Maritime et Aérien (Groupe C.T.M.A.), transports goods year-round.

In summer the STQ offers an 8-day round-trip cruise from Port of Montreal to the Port of Cap-aux-Meules. This service has been on hold between 2020 and 2023.

==== Road ====
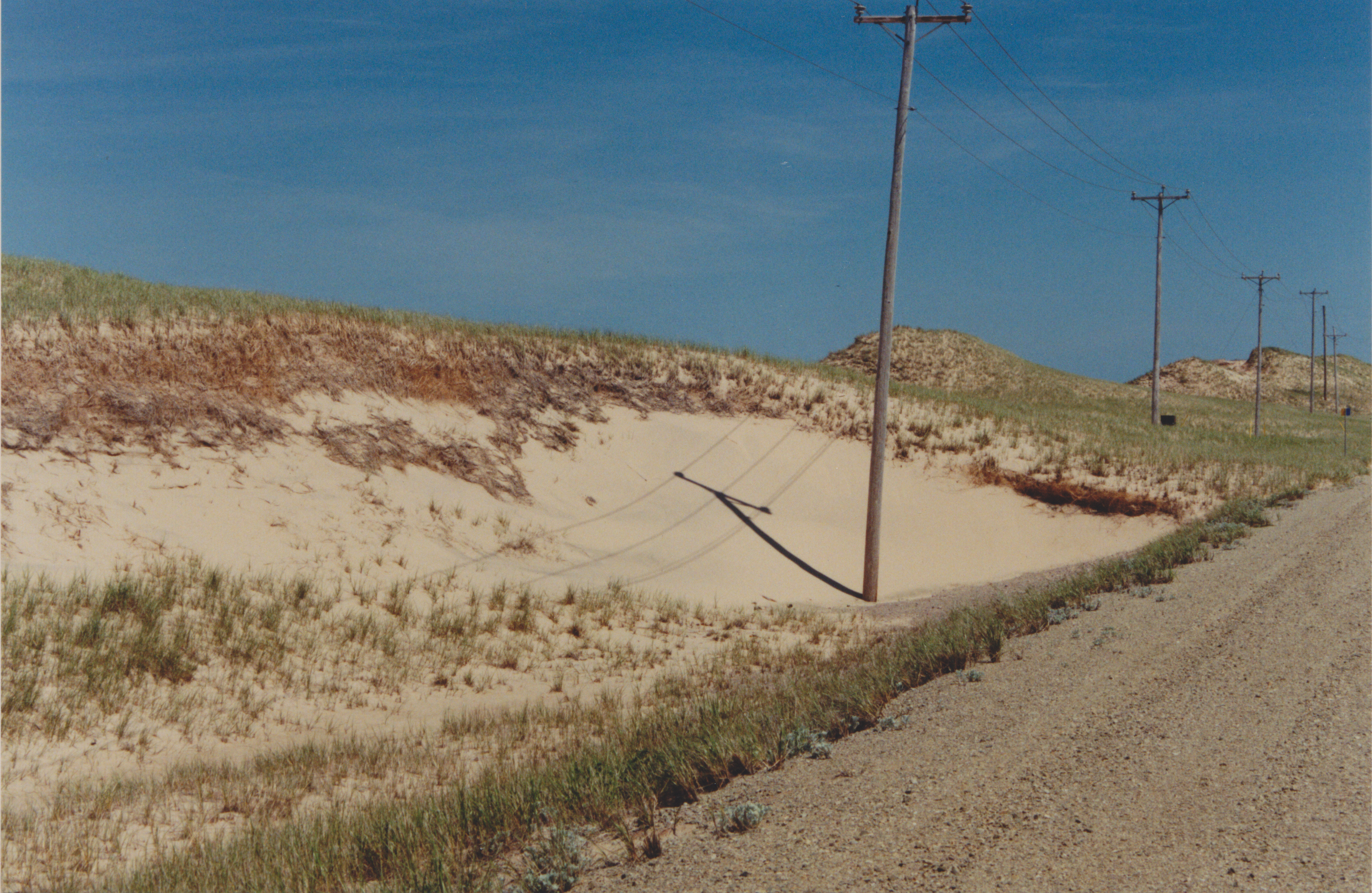
Quebec Route 199, between Pointe-aux-Loups (Hameau) and Grosse-Île

Quebec Route 199 is an essential link for the municipality of Îles-de-la-Madeleine.

In April 2023, Geneviève Guilbault, Quebec's Minister of Transport and Sustainable Mobility (Transports Québec) announced the start of work to protect Highway 199, which will protect the road from coastal hazards and limit the consequences of coastal erosion and submersion on road network infrastructure. According to the Minister, the work demonstrates the government's willingness to innovate in the context of climate change.

==== Air ====
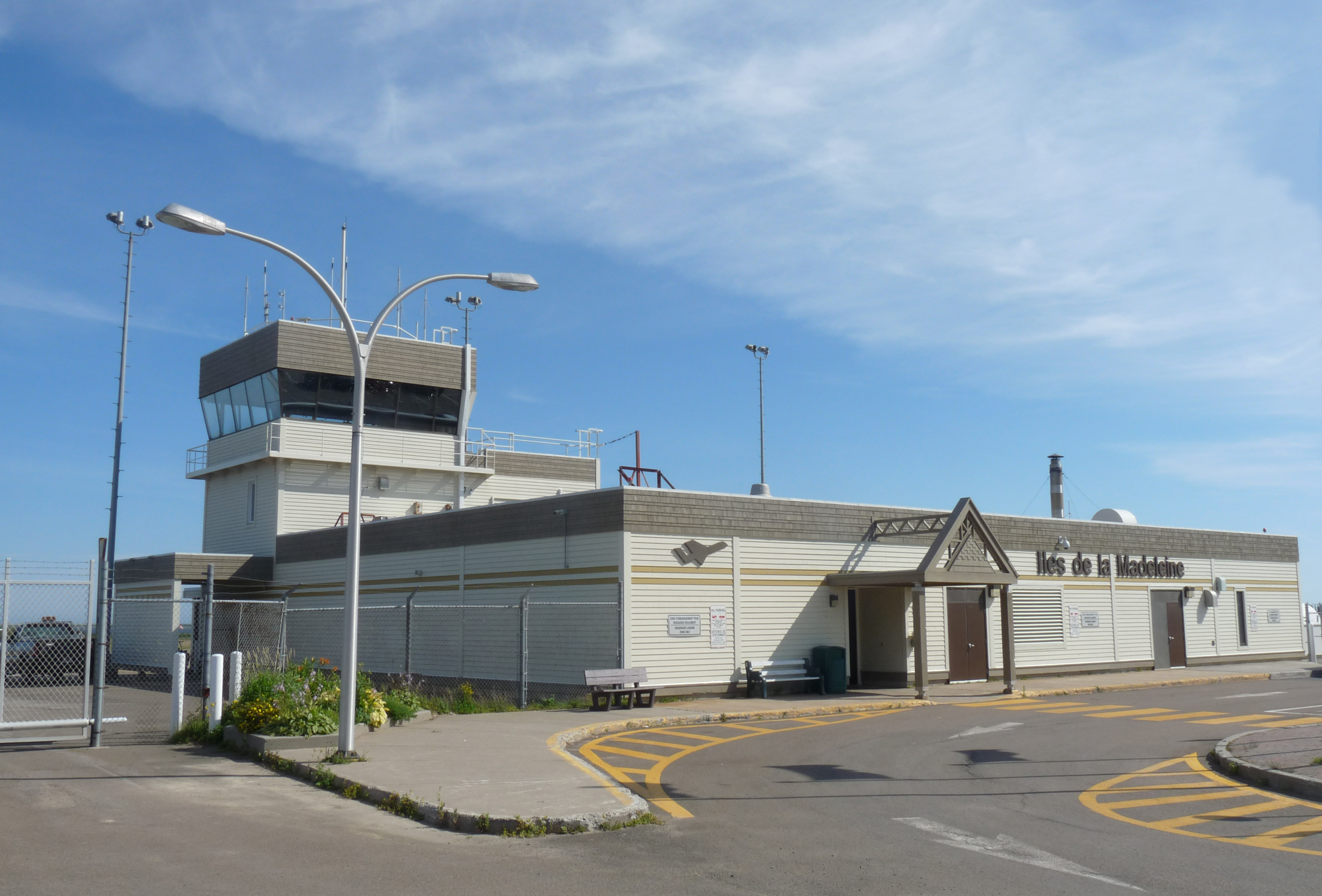
Building and facilities

Îles-de-la-Madeleine Airport is located at Havre-aux-Maisons. The airport operates flights across the archipelago as well as to Montreal, Quebec City and Gaspé and seasonally, to the French overseas collectivity of Saint-Pierre and Miquelon.

== Photos ==
Here and there

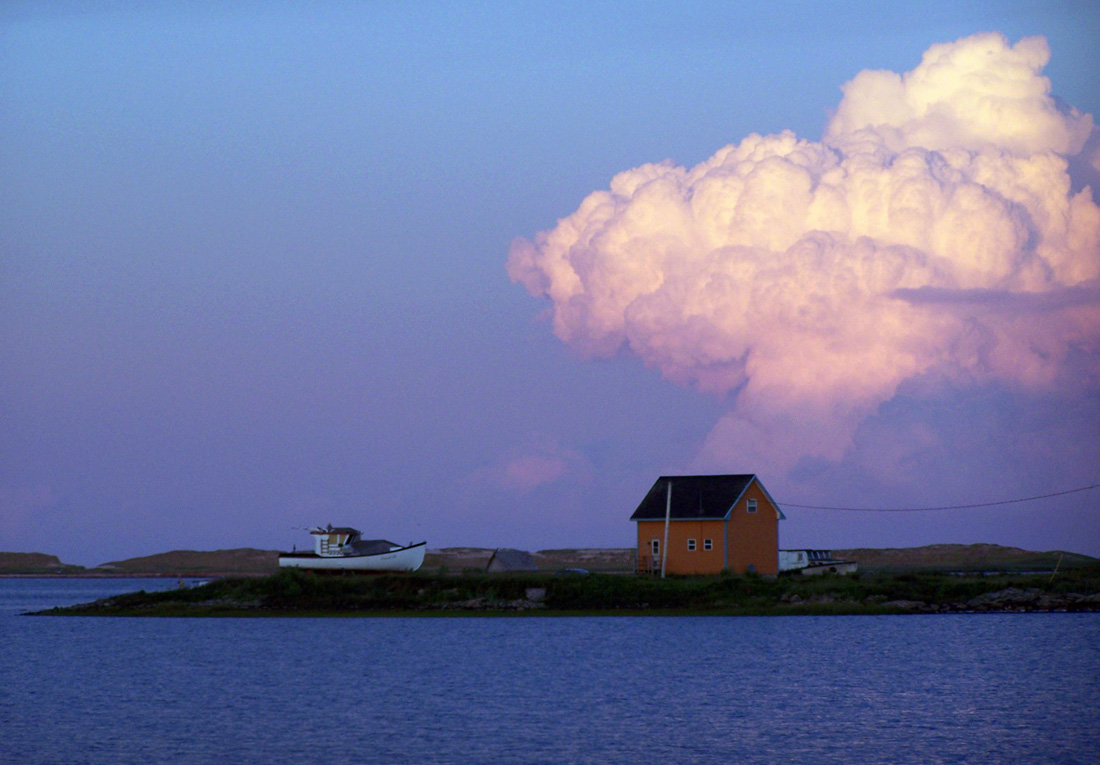
Havre-Aubert

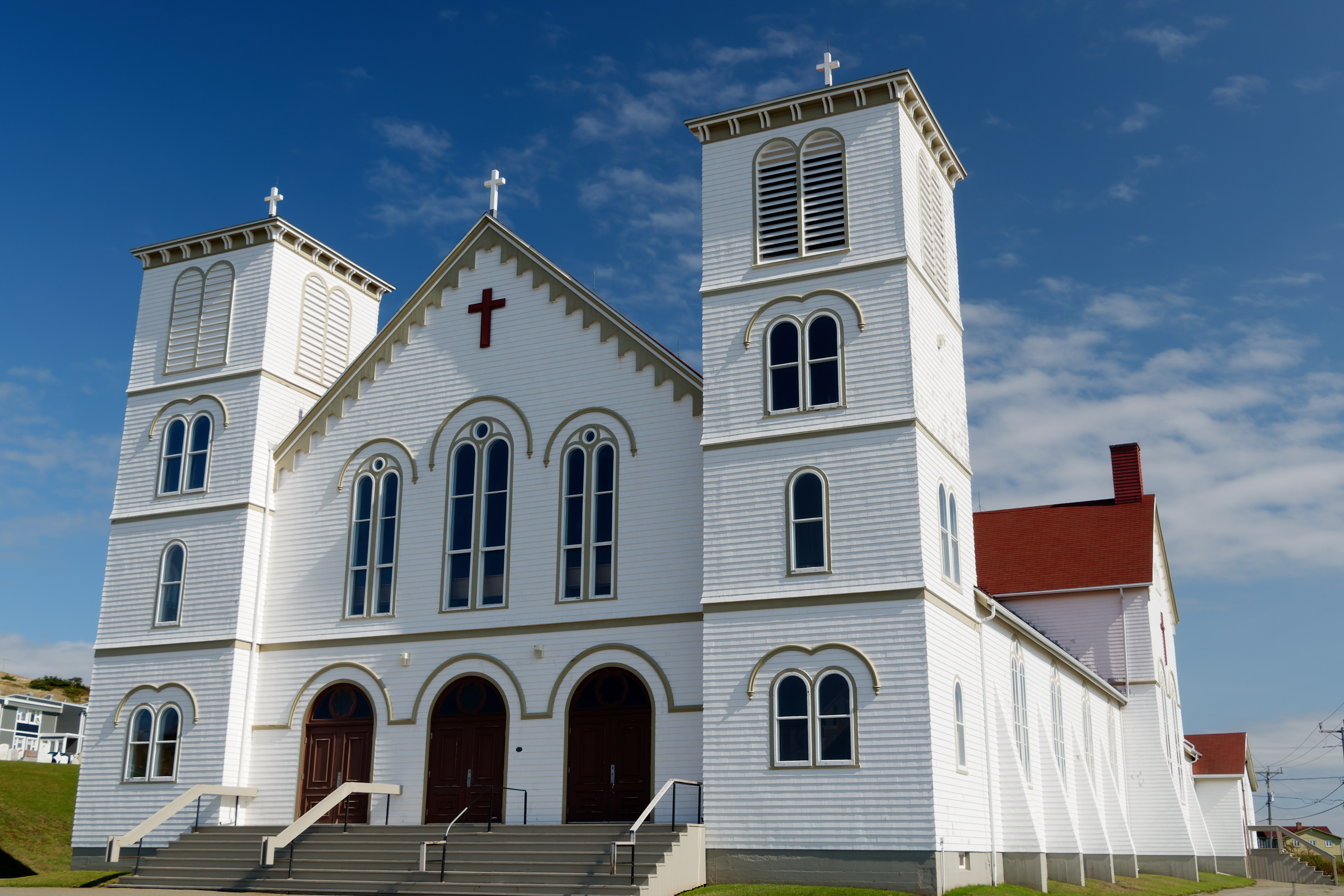
Saint-François-Xavier Church in Bassin

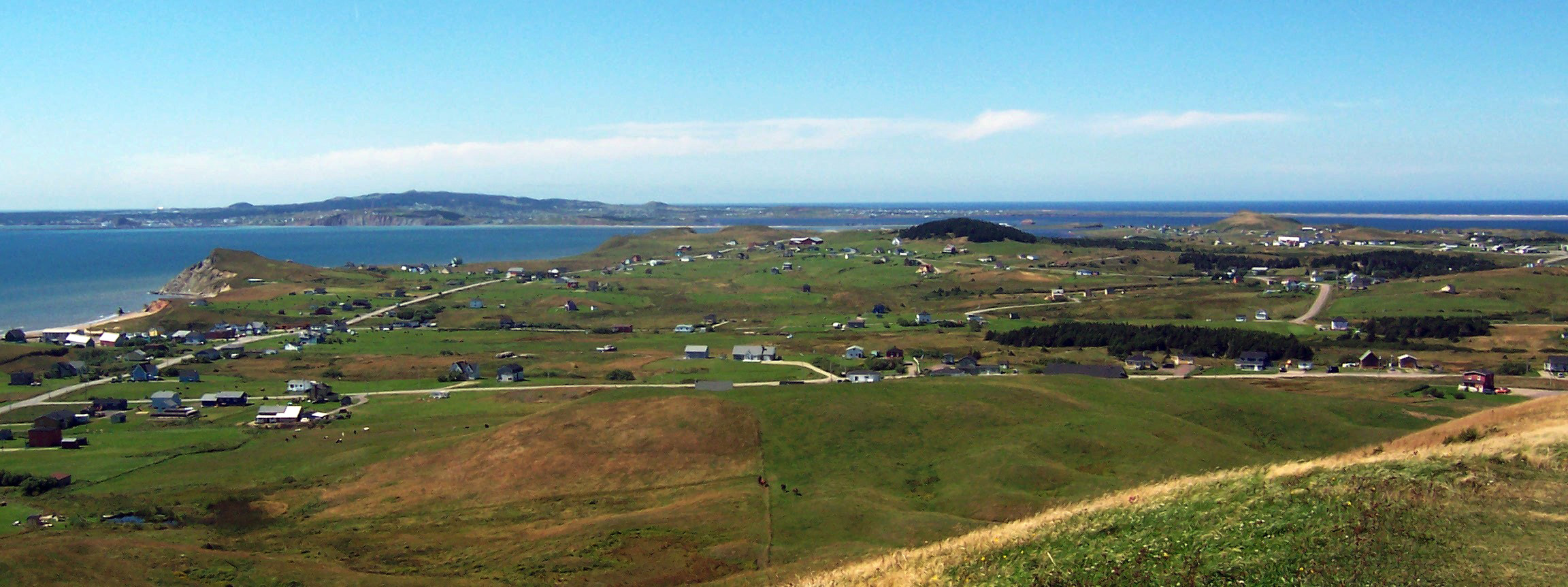
Havre-aux-Maisons

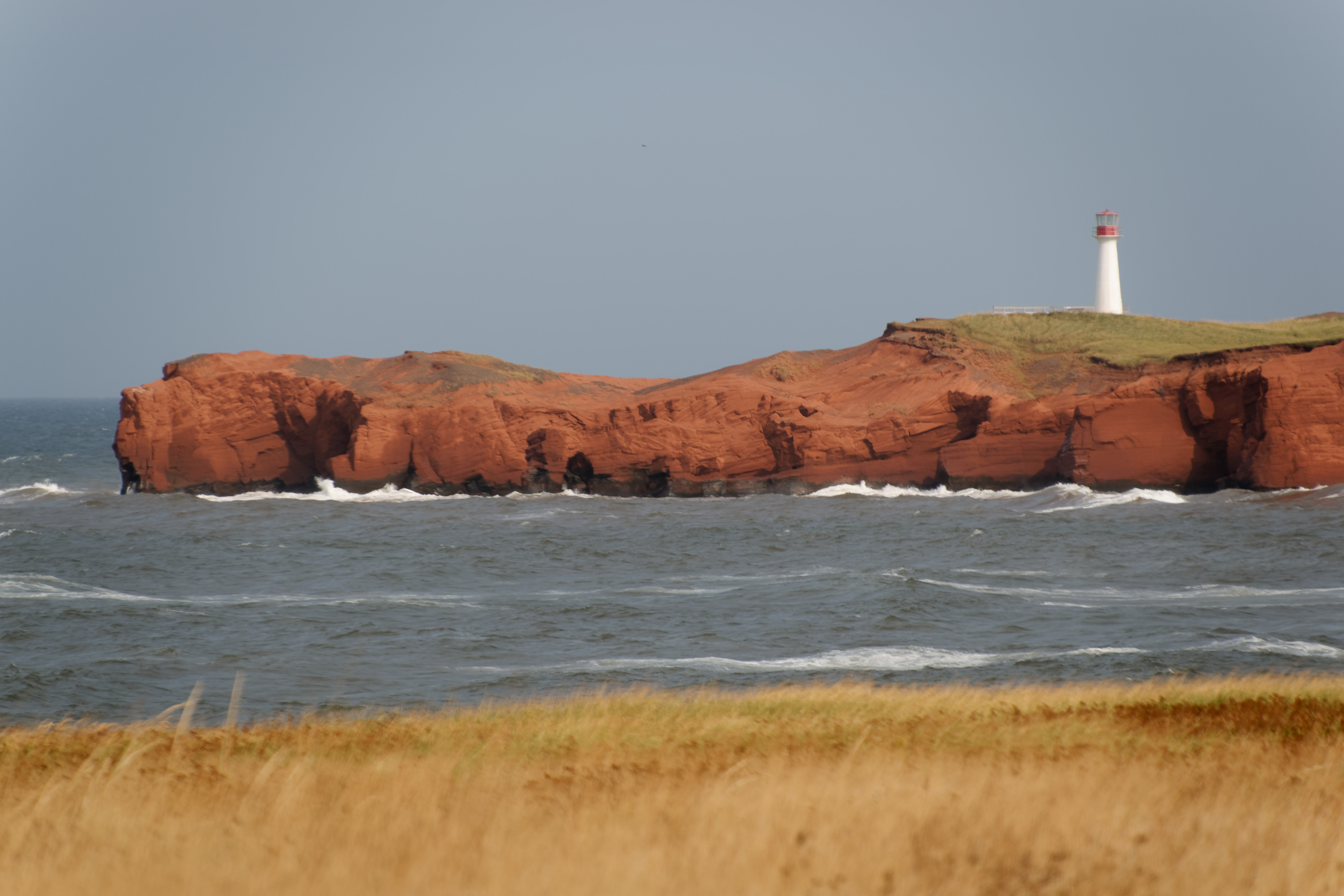
Borgot lighthouse in L'Étang-du-Nord

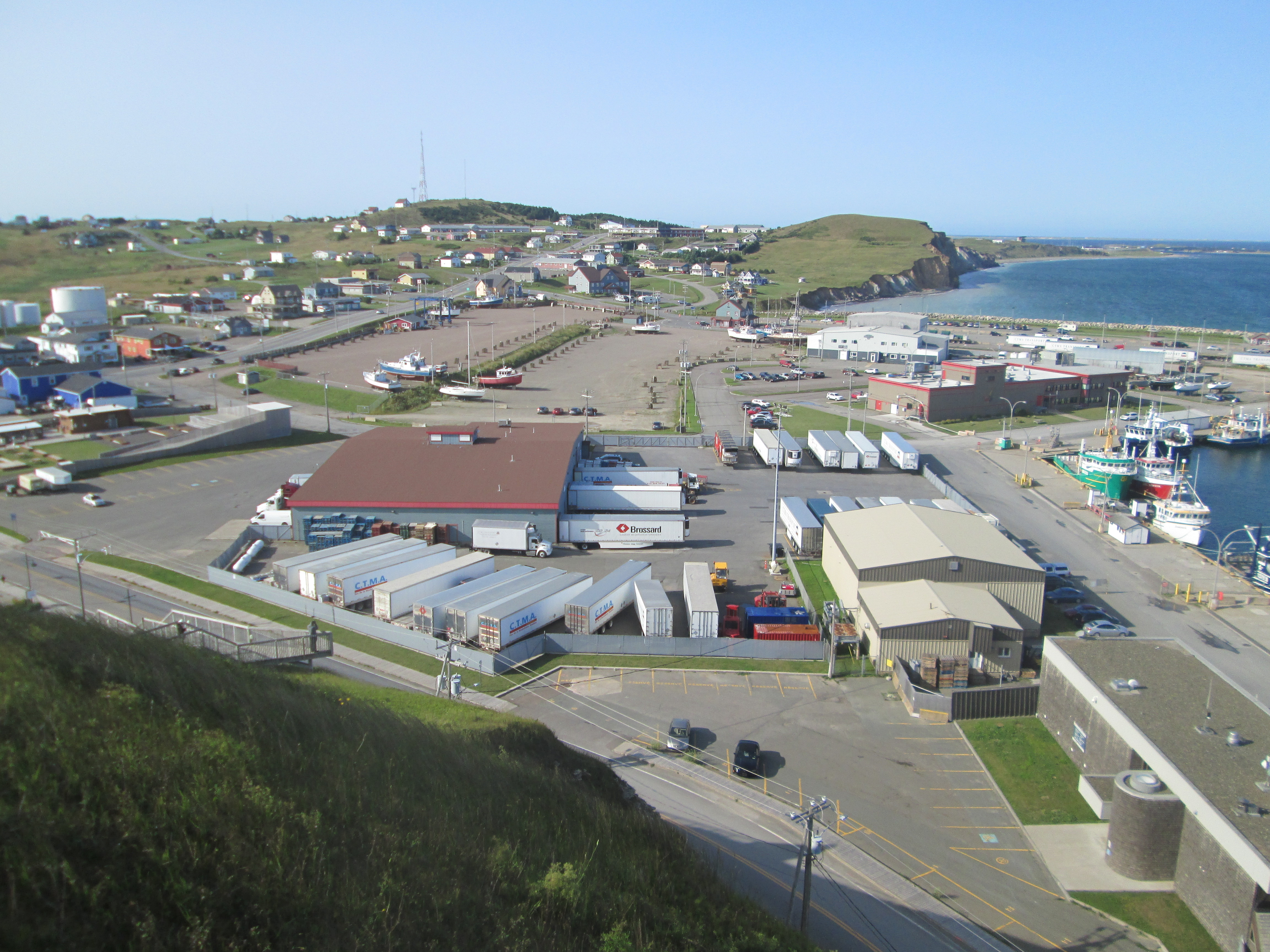
Grindstone (Cap-aux-Meules)

== See also ==
- List of municipalities in Quebec
