= France Cayouette =

Canadian writer and educator (born 1960)

- Born: December 7, 1960 (age 65); Bonaventure, Quebec, Canada
- Education: Université de Montréal; Université du Québec à Rimouski
- Occupations: Writer; educator

France Cayouette (born December 7, 1960) is a Canadian writer and educator living in Quebec.

She was born in Bonaventure and went on to earn a bachelor's degree in literature at the Université de Montréal. Cayouette also earned a certificate in education science from the Université du Québec à Rimouski. She taught literature and creative writing at the Centre d’études collégiales Baie-des-Chaleurs. Cayouette was co-founder of the Regroupement des auteures et auteurs de la Gaspésie, a writer's association in the Gaspé region.

She has contributed to various literary magazines, including Le Sabord, Estuaire, Les Écrits and Arcade and participates in various literary festivals.

Three of her collections of poetry were shortlisted for the Prix de poésie Radio-Canada.

== Selected works ==
- La lenteur au bout de l’aile, haiku (2007)
- Jolie vente de débarras, poetry (2008)
- Verser la lumière, haiku (2009)
- Voix indigènes, poetry (2014)
