= L'Étang-du-Nord =

Village in Les Îles-de-la-Madeleine, Quebec, Canada

Coordinates: 47°21′30″N 61°57′00″W

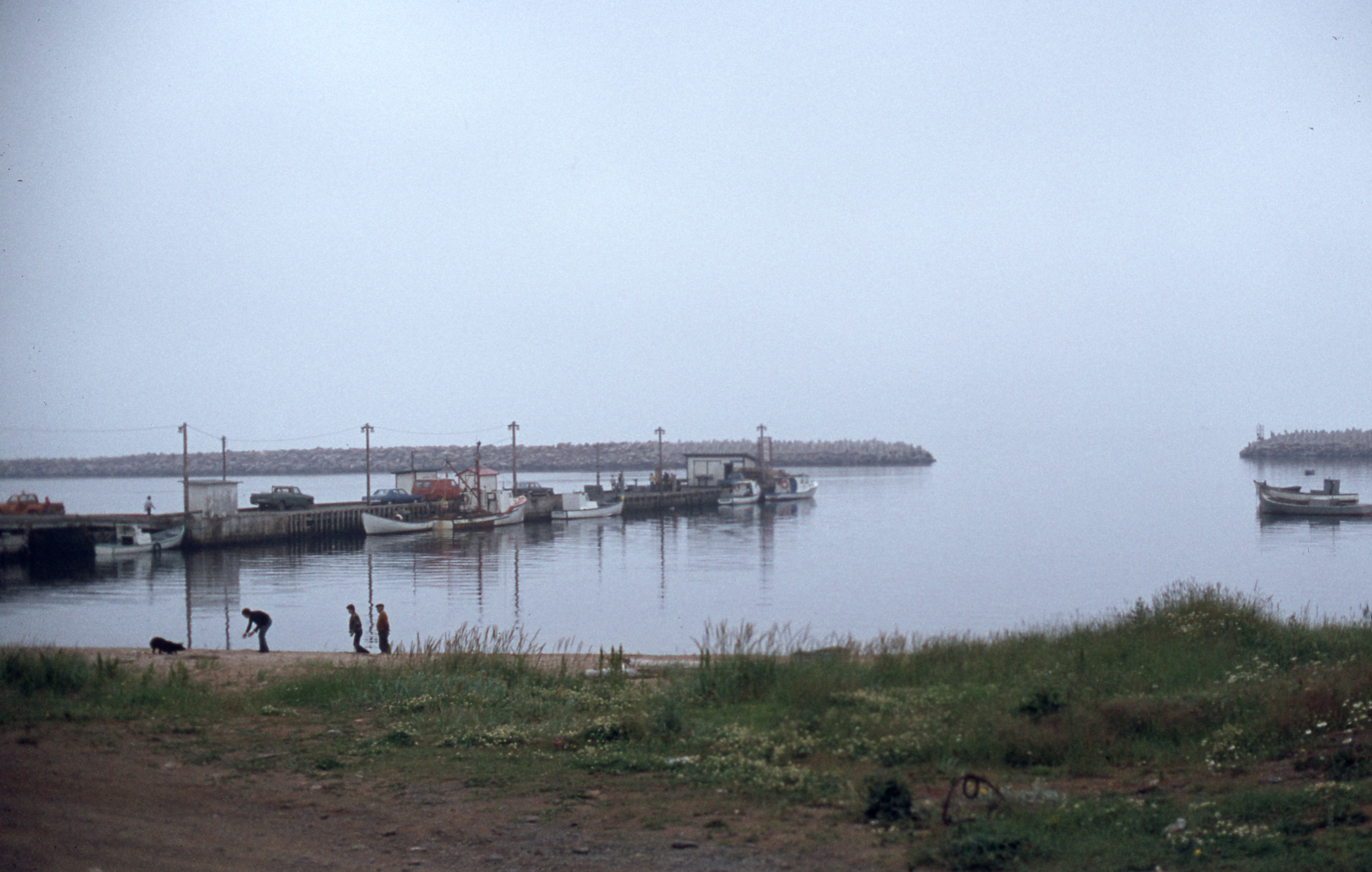
Jetty, fishing harbour, Anse de l'Étang du Nord (cove)

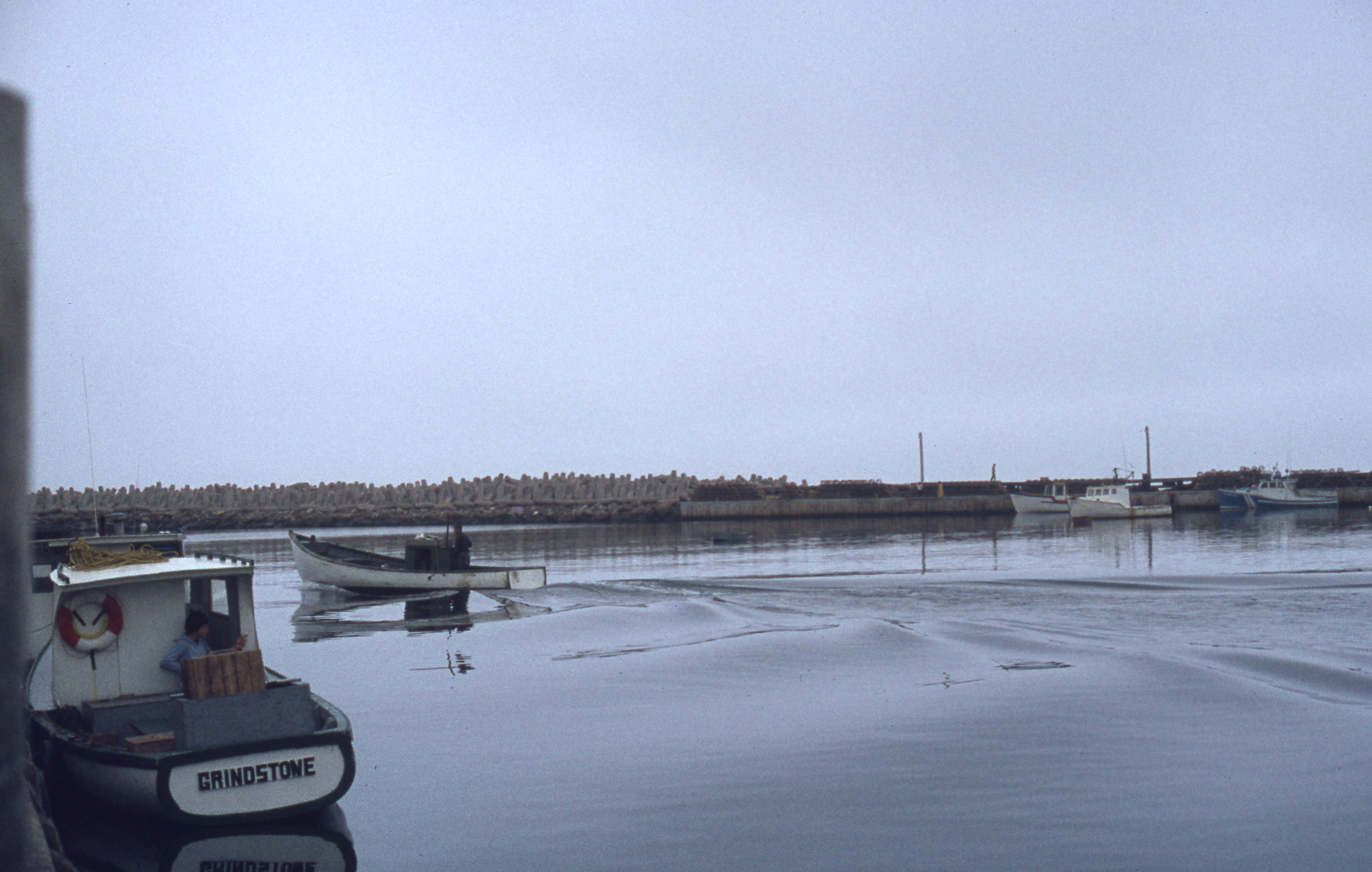
Jetty, fishing harbour, fishing boat, Anse de l'Étang du Nord (cove)

L'Étang-du-Nord (French pronunciation: [letɑ̃ dy nɔʁ]) is a village in the municipality of Les Îles-de-la-Madeleine. It is part of the Magdalen Islands archipelago, in the Gulf of St. Lawrence, Quebec, Canada.

In February 2021, the Municipality of Les Îles-de-la-Madeleine made amendments to Zoning Plan No. 2010-08. The amendments affected the village of L'Étang-du-Nord, modifying an urban perimeter, residential, resort and forest zones, as well as specific provisions relating to the scenic corridors of the Belle-Anse sector.

The village of L'Étang-du-Nord is the main fishing centre of the Magdalen Islands. The place received its first inhabitants around 1830 and was officially erected as a municipality in 1875. The community hosts a campus of Cégep de la Gaspésie et des Îles, the Magdalen Islands' only post-secondary institution.

The village unfolds around the cove of the Étang du Nord, entered between Cap à Savage and Cap à Fidèle. In the cove there are three breakwaters protecting the fishing harbour. Two are public wharves, one is a floating wharf, 70 m (230 ft) long, the second, encased in stone, extends 130 m (430 ft). This harbour is managed by the harbour authority Administration du Havre de pêche de L’Étang-du-Nord.
