= Havre-Aubert =

Village in Les Îles-de-la-Madeleine, Quebec, Canada

Coordinates: 47°14′10″N 61°50′50″W

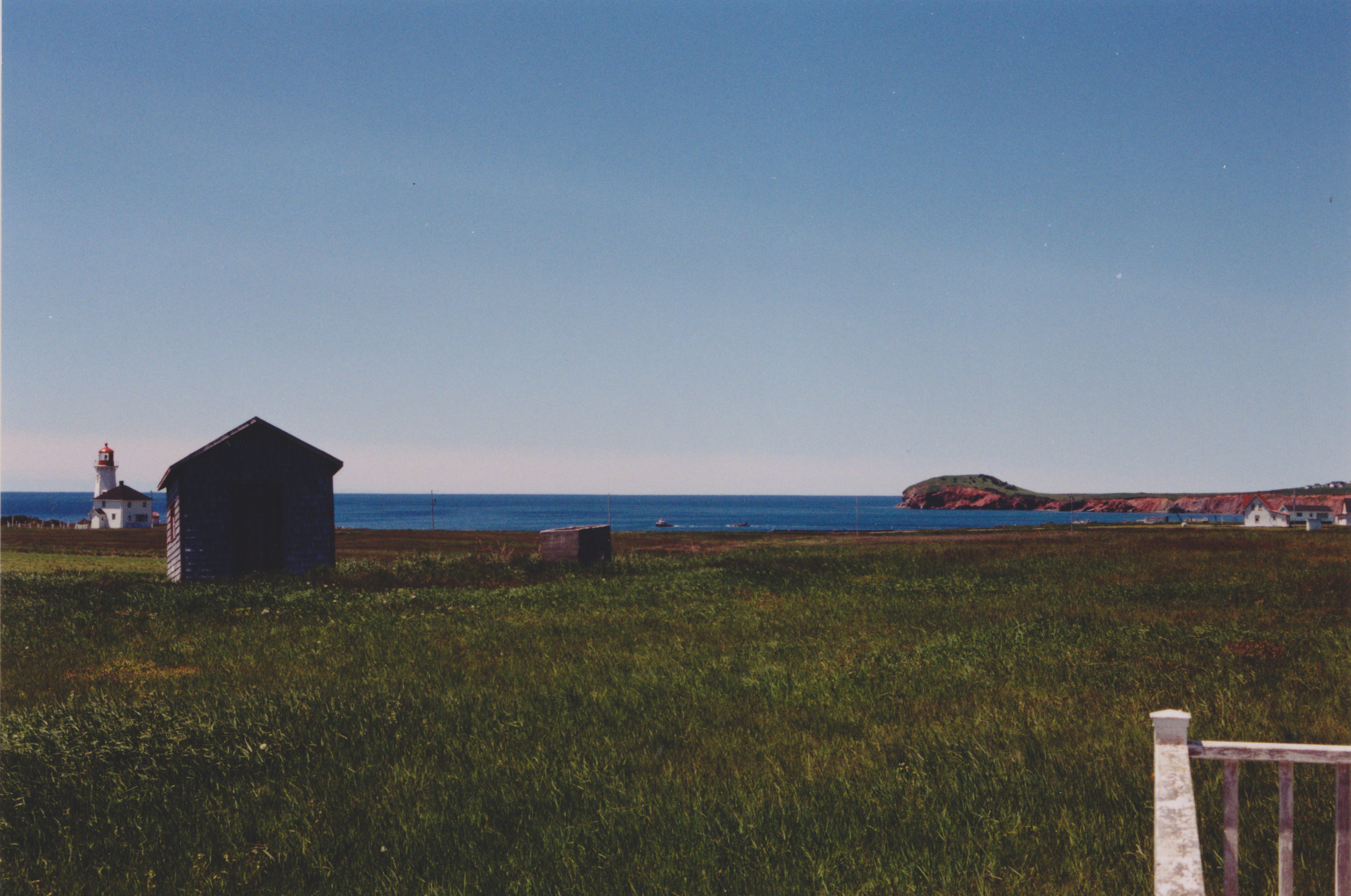
Lighthouse of L'Anse-à-la-Cabane, formerly Millerand

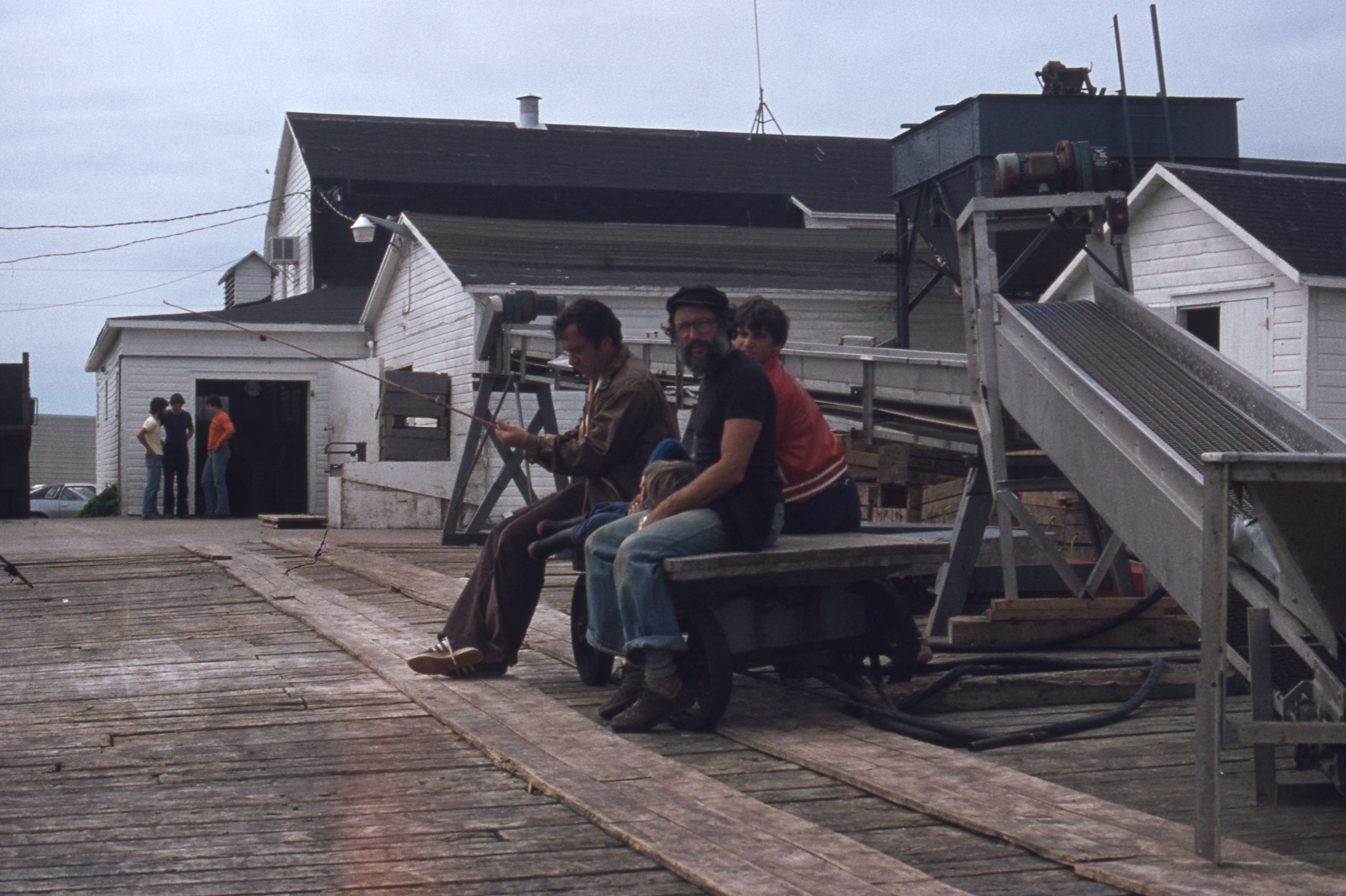
Dock of the Maritime Packers fish processing plant (1930), then the National Sea, site of La Grave

Havre-Aubert (French pronunciation: [avʁ obɛʁ]) located on Île du Havre Aubert is a village in the municipality of Les Îles-de-la-Madeleine. It is part of the Magdalen Islands archipelago, in the Gulf of St. Lawrence, Quebec, Canada.

Havre Aubert Island is made up of two main localities, Havre-Aubert and Bassin, subdivided into hamlets: Portage-du-Cap, La Baie, La Montagne, L'Anse-à-la-Cabane, former name Millerand, and L'Étang-des-Caps.

Amherst Island's first settlers arrived in 1762 from Acadia, Prince Edward Island and the Chaleur Bay. A municipality, Havre-Aubert, was constituted in 1875 and changed its name to Bassin in 1959. Another municipality, Havre-Aubert-Est, was constituted in 1951 and changed its name to Havre-Aubert in 1964. Both amalgamated in 1971 and took the name of L'Île-du-Havre-Aubert. The island is a member of the Association of the Most Beautiful Villages of Quebec.

== History ==
Returning from France in 1626, Samuel de Champlain would have spent a night in the Pleasant Bay he would have given the name "Aubert" to the southernmost island of the Magdalen Islands. An English map of 1756 identifies the places Harbour Ober, the name Amherst was given to the post office between 1899 and 1907, Amherst Island became Havre-Aubert in 1907.

Historians do not agree on the origin of the name "Havre-Aubert." Some suggested the name of an obscure friend of Jacques Cartier, while others brought up Thomas Aubert, a sailor from Dieppe and one of the Americas' first explorers, or François Aubert de La Chesnaye, who would have supported the colonization efforts of New France, as likely explanations. Some have mentioned a family of sailors named "Auber" and other hypotheses include that of French explorer Jean-François Roberval, who would have stayed on the island in 1542, having named it "Havre au Ber". The term "ber" itself meaning, in this case, "berceau" (cradle in English, while "havre" is French for harbour). Roberval's child was still a baby at the time; although, in terms of an explanation, this is really nothing but speculation and hearsay. It probably references the "high quality" of port; in layman's terms.

However, "ber" is also a marine term designating the wooden structure on which a boat lies during construction or repairs. Yet, while this is an interesting fact to note, it is likely to be a simple slang term in French to reference the berceau, heard and used in conversation by the anglophone population over the years. Meanwhile, an anonymous British map of the area in 1756 named it Harbour Ober, which was in all likelihood, an anglicization of French-origin place-names. The post office, opened in 1899, bore the name "Amherst Island" until 1907.

In 2000, a new municipality named L'Île-du-Havre-Aubert was constituted following the amalgamation of L'Île-du-Havre-Aubert and the village of L'Île-d'Entrée. Entry Island is the only inhabited island part of the Magdalen Islands unconnected to the rest of the archipelago by land. It is located 5 km (3.1 mi) east of Amherst Island and it is one of the three English-speaking centres of the archipelago. It saw its first inhabitants in the early 19th century.

Entry Island owes its name to the fact that it is located at the southeast entrance of the archipelago. A ferry service exists between Entry Island and the village of Grindstone.
