= Entry Island =

Island off the east coast of the Magdalen Islands in Quebec, Canada

Coordinates: 47.277°N 61.700°W

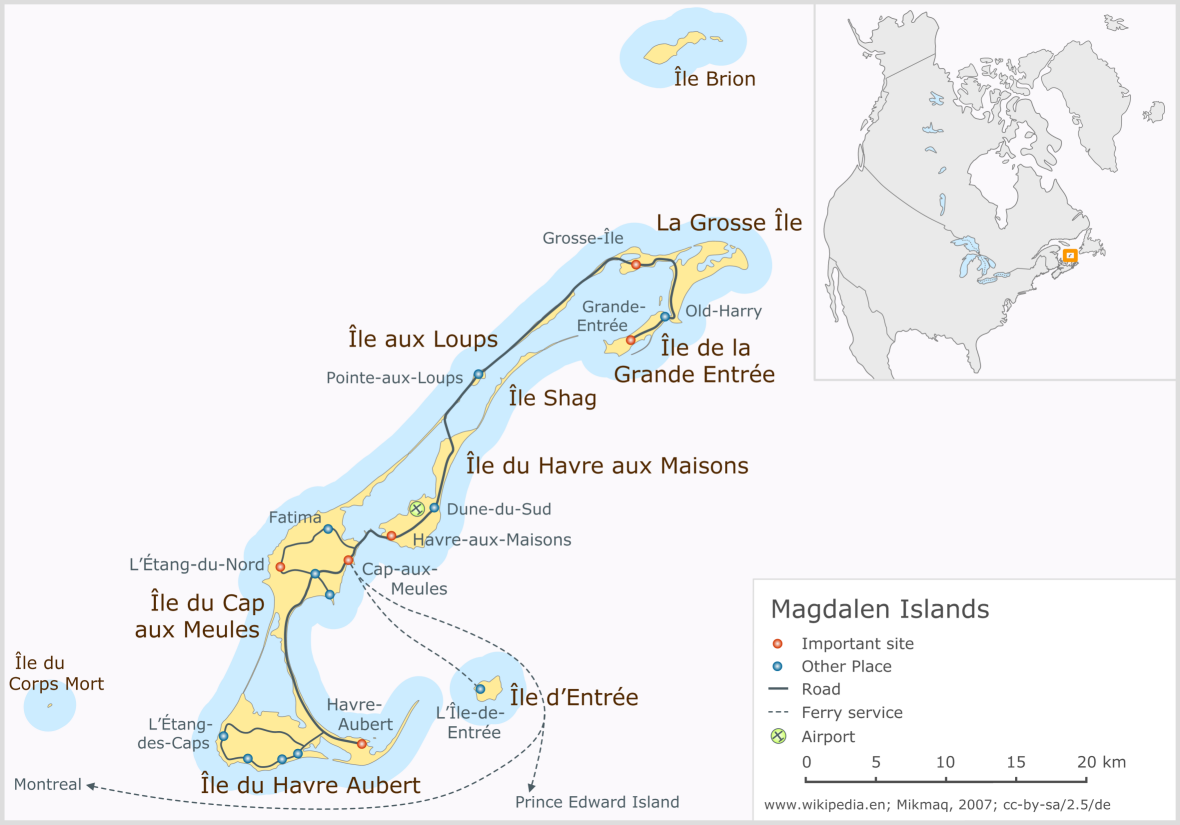
The Magdalen Islands, with Entry Island Île-d’Entrée at the bottom right

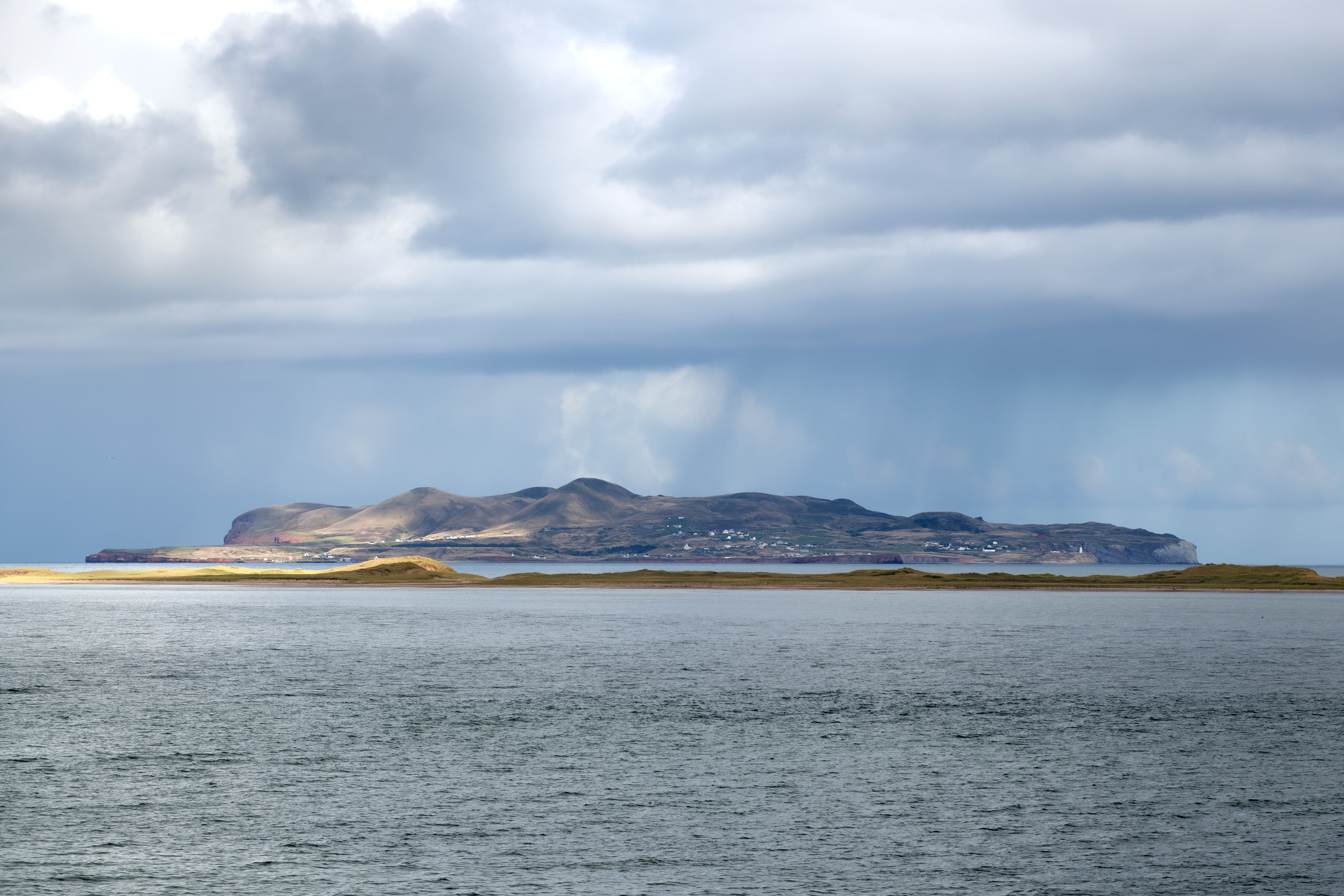
Entry Island

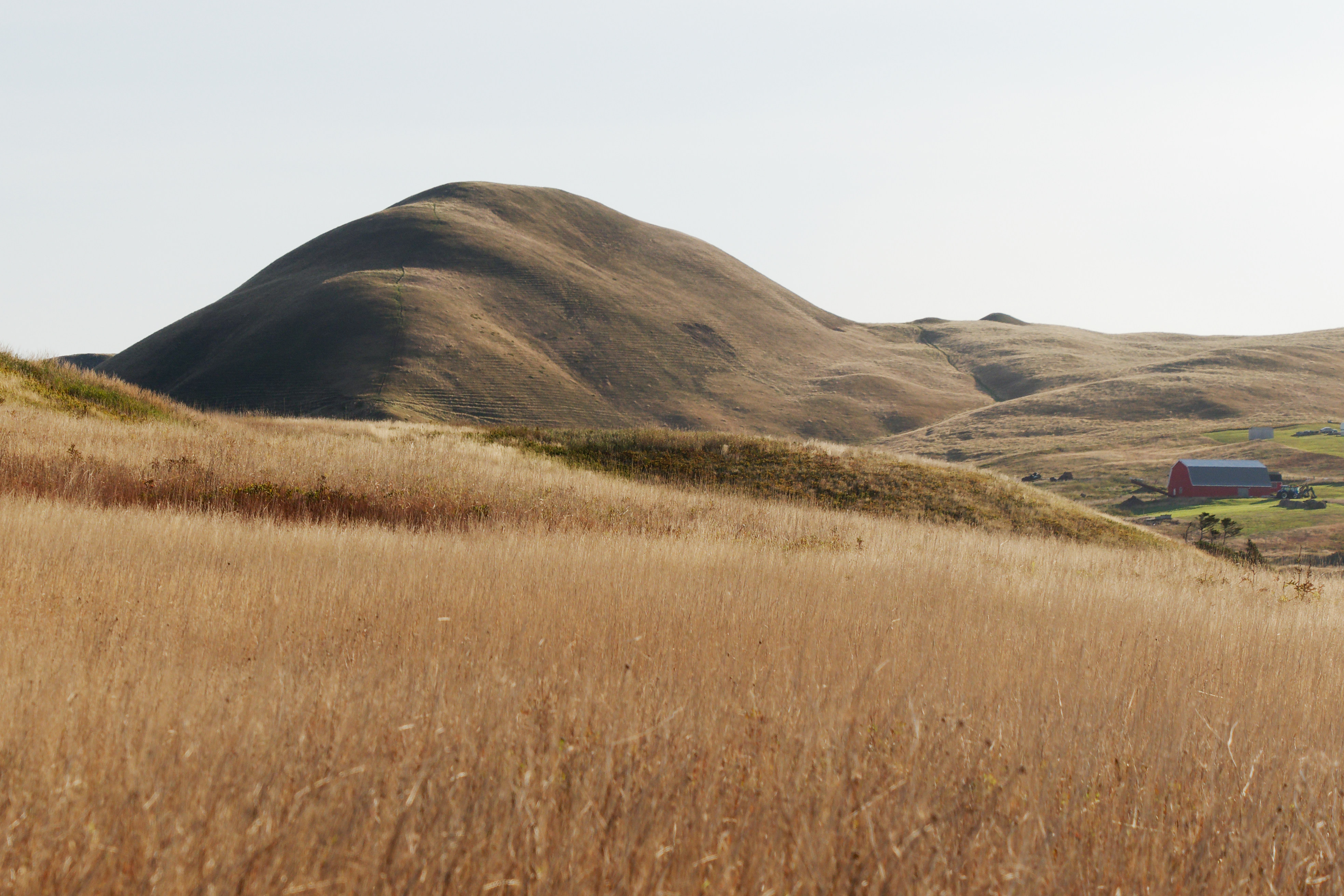
Big Hill

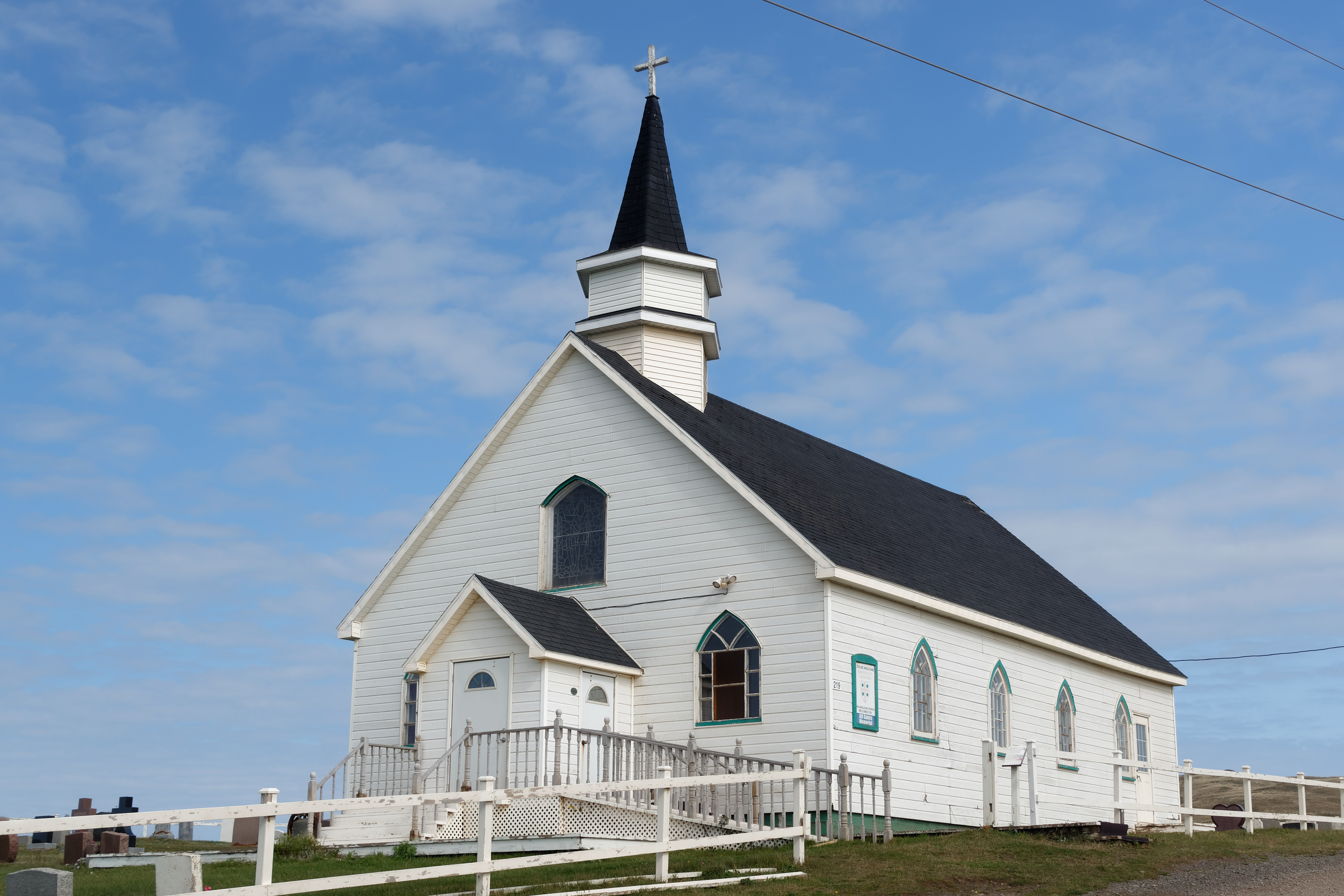
Anglican Church

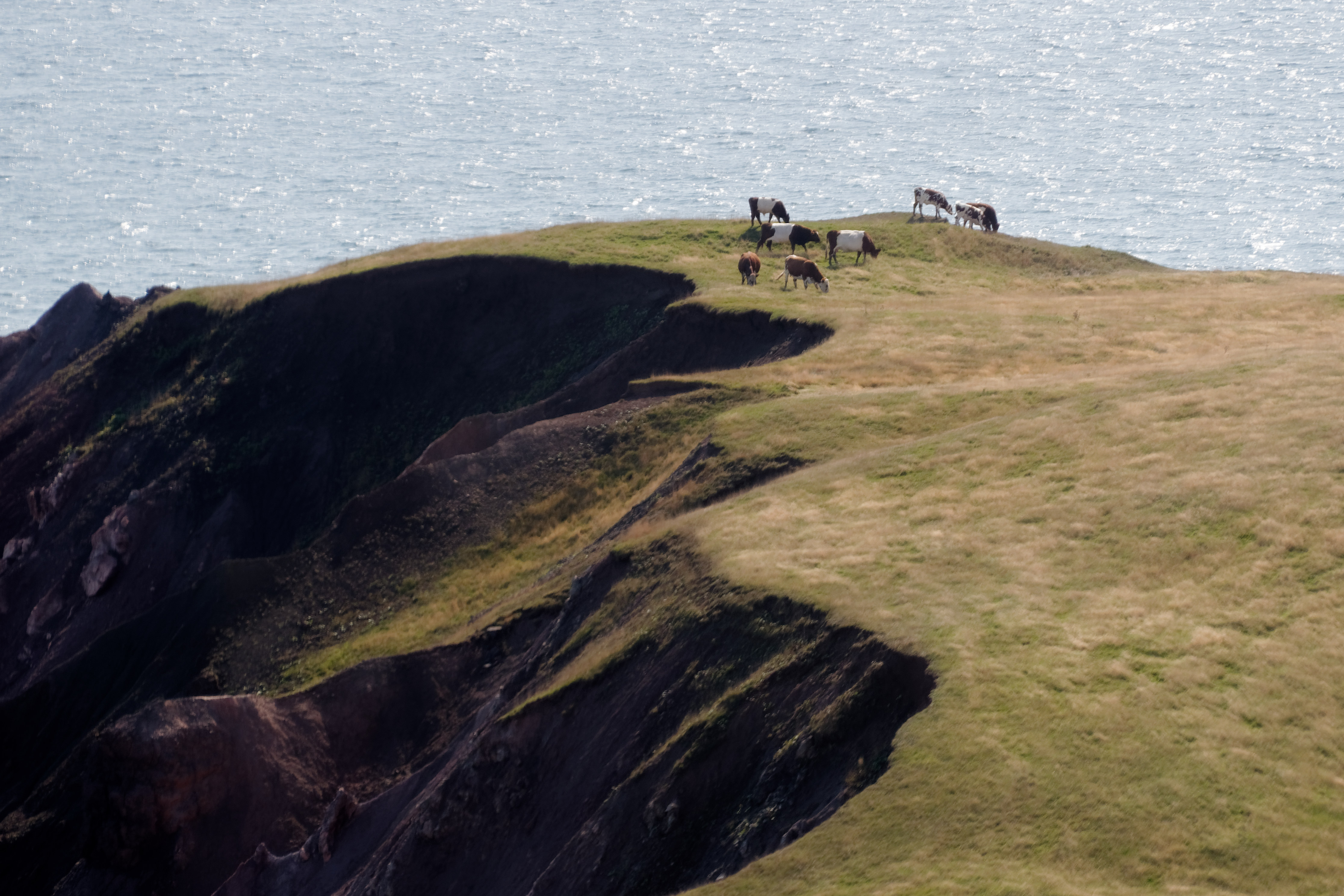
Community pasture

Entry Island (French: Île-d’Entrée, pronounced [il dɑ̃tʁe]) is an island off the east coast of the Magdalen Islands, which are part of the Canadian province of Quebec. The island is 2 kilometres (1.2 miles) wide and 3 kilometres (1.9 miles) long. The island is located 12 kilometres (7.5 miles) from the main port of Cap-aux-Meules of the Magdalen Islands. Entry Island is only accessible by ocean or air. The island is also home to an English-speaking community.

Fishing is the main industry of the island with the lobster fishery being the most important, but some fishermen also harvest crab, scallops, whelk, mackerel, tuna and herring.

Approximately 60 residents reside on Entry Island year around. That is down from 270 in 1980.

Visible as the first island when travelling by ferry from Prince Edward Islands to the Magdalen Islands, Entry Island can be identified by its lavishly tinted cliffs. Beautiful, unspoiled rolling green hills are one of the main attractions of Entry Island. At 174 meters (571 feet) above sea level, Big Hill is the highest elevation on the island, and is also the highest point of land in the archipelago. The island has two stores, a restaurant, an Anglican church, CLSC, museum, and post office; a bed and breakfast operates during the tourist season.

In July 2010, a small military exercise called Exercise "SABRE" took place on the island, lasting 18 days.

The Entry Island School closed permanently in 2015. The remaining 2 school age students reside on the main islands during the school year and are now attending the English speaking school at Grosse-Île. They are to be there until the late 2020s and maybe 2030. There are no school age students that are permanently living on Entry Island due to no school.

== Transport ==
A ferry comes to Entry twice a day except Sundays, Christmas Day and New Years Day. When visitors come to Entry Island, after an hour boat ride, they may see more four-wheelers or snowmobiles (depending on the season) at the pier than cars. There is no gas station on Entry Island.

There is a year-round local ferry service that transports passengers, mail and freight. Vehicle transportation has to be arranged ahead of time and is limited to one or two vehicles per run. The last ice bridge connecting Entry Island to Amherst Island occurred in 1993. This winter bridge is used by islanders travelling on snowmobiles, horses and even automobiles as well as on foot (for the intrepid) according to winter conditions.

The airfield on Entry Island has two paved runways, but it has no scheduled passenger service. There is also a wooden helipad with no further aviation infrastructure at the North-East corner of the island (La Cormorandière).

Entry Island is one of three anglophone communities on the Magdalen Islands, the other two being Grosse-Île and Old Harry. Entry Island is the only totally secluded community, as the others (anglophone and francophone) are all connected by sand dunes and a highway, Route 199.

== In fiction ==
Canadian children's author Peter Cumming's 1984, picture book A Horse Called Farmer, illustrated by P. John Burden, and the French translation by Henri-Dominique Paratte, Cheval des îles, retell the true story of a 1920's Entry Island horse, as does Stompin' Tom Connors' 1993, song "Horse Called Farmer." Scottish author Peter May's 2013 book Entry Island is a detective novel mostly set on the island and involving the Sureté du Québec investigating a homicide linked to Scottish migrants uprooted by the 19th Century Highlands Clearances. Quebec author Jean Lemieux's 2009 book La lune rouge is a psychological novel set on the island. It has been translated into English as The Red Moon (Cormorant Press, 1994) and into German as Das Gesetz der Insel, (Droemer Knaur, publisher). The beginning of the science-fiction novel The Odyssey of the Penelope ( L'odysée du Pénélope, Aurora Award 1998) by Jean-Pierre Guillet, takes place on the island.

Stompin' Tom Connors song "Where Would I Be?" is about Entry.

== See also ==
- Magdalen Islands
- Municipal reorganization in Quebec
- List of Quebec regions
- Coins of the Magdalen Islands (numismatic history).
- List of islands of Quebec
