= Grande-Entrée =

Village in Les Îles-de-la-Madeleine, Quebec, Canada

Coordinates: 47°33′10″N 61°32′50″W

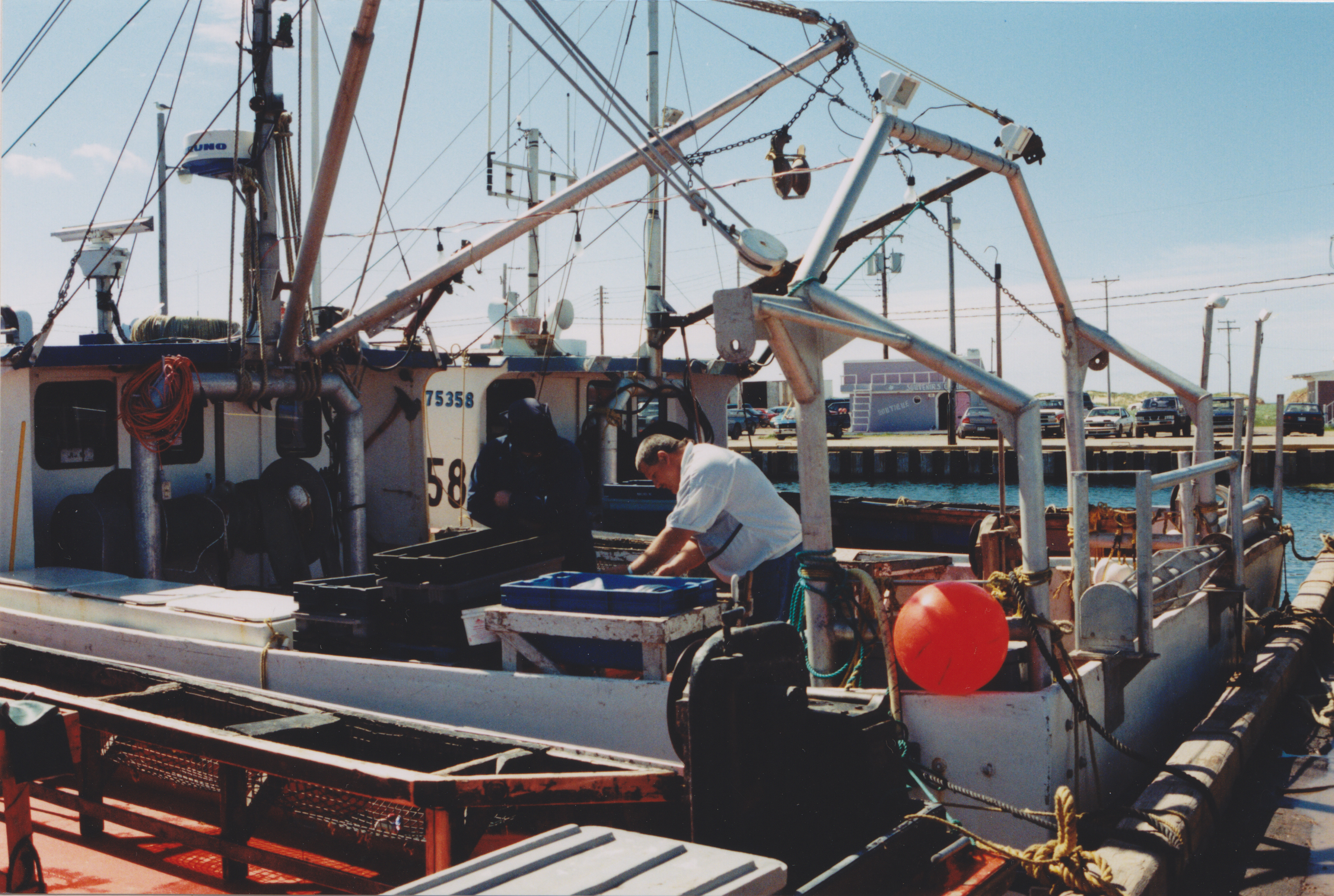
Port of Grande-Entrée, lobster boats at the quayside

Grande-Entrée (French pronunciation: [ɡʁɑ̃d ɑ̃tʁe]) is a village in the municipality of Les Îles-de-la-Madeleine. It is located on Grande Entrée Island (Île de la Grande Entrée), part of the Magdalen Islands archipelago, in the Gulf of St. Lawrence, Quebec, Canada. The village is made up of two points of land facing each other which, between their arms, form a bay where boats can enter as if in a natural harbour, hence the name Grande-Entrée.

Scots settled on the island at the end of the 18th century, but Basque fishermen had already stopped over there during the 16th century. An identification guide for marine fishes of the estuary and northern Gulf of St. Lawrence was completed in 2008.
