= Magdalen Island penny token =

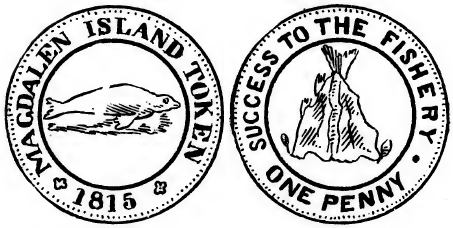
Magdalen Island Penny Token, as illustrated in Breton's Illustrated History of Coins and Tokens Relating to Canada (1894)

The Magdalen Island penny token was a token that was originally issued for use on the Magdalen Islands and throughout Lower Canada and the Maritime Provinces in the early 19th century. This token was issued in 1815 by Sir Isaac Coffin, who was granted the island by the British government in reward for his loyalty to the crown during the American Revolutionary War. While not a rare coin, it is hard to find in anything but worn condition, and even prices for pieces in the lowest grades tend to start at about at about C$100 and go up rapidly from there.

== History ==
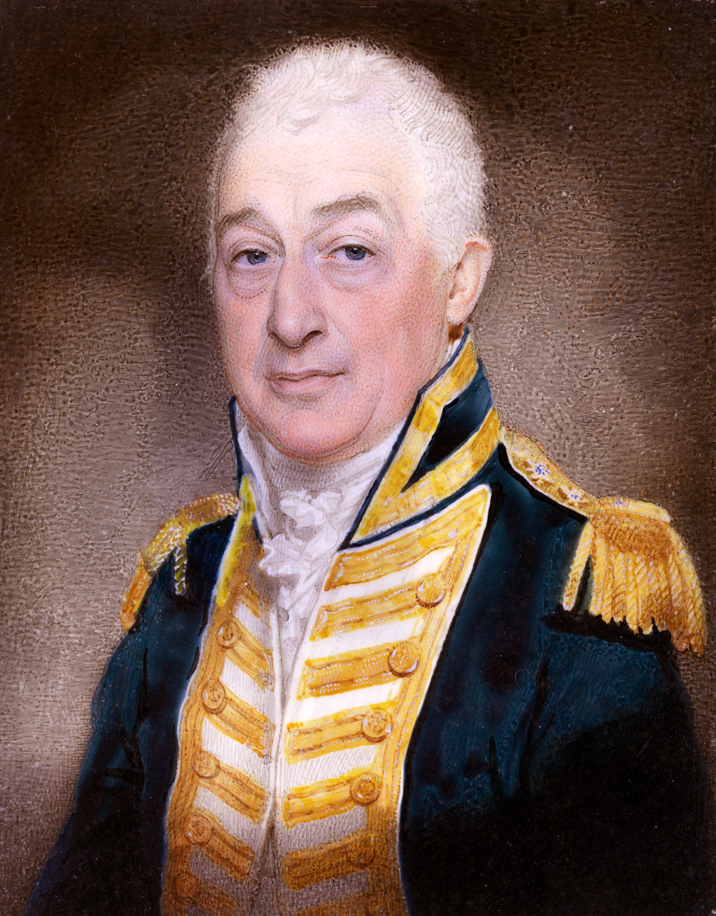
A portrait of Isaac Coffin (1759–1839)

The Magdalen Islands (Fr. Îles de la Madeleine) form a small archipelago in the Gulf of Saint Lawrence with a land area of 205.53 square kilometers (79.36 sq mi). Though closer to Prince Edward Island and Nova Scotia, the islands form part of the Canadian province of Quebec. While there were boundary disputes between Labrador and Lower Canada over the islands, their inhabitants were largely French and the islands were transferred to Lower Canada by the Quebec Act 1774.

Sir Isaac Coffin (16 May 1759 – 23 July 1839) was an officer of the Royal Navy who served during the American War of Independence and the French Revolutionary and Napoleonic Wars. In 1787 he began operating in the Gulf of Saint Lawrence and took a particular interest in the Magdalen Islands. He warned the governor's council that New Englanders were exploiting the fisheries in the gulf and were trading illegally with the inhabitants of these islands. Coffin, an American loyalist who had been deprived of his patrimony by the outcome of the War of Independence, was granted the islands in 1798 for his good service.

Coffin planned to set up a feudal system on the Magdalen Islands, and he distributed the coins on the only occasion he visited the island. His attempts to attract settlers or evict the squatters who had arrived from Saint Pierre and Miquelon were unsuccessful. The local populace resented his authoritarian ways, with the cry of "Fouettez King George and King Coffin!" ("Whip King George and King Coffin"), as he was leaving the island.

While it has been said that the penny token was little used by the islanders, the tokens were clearly well-circulated as few examples are available in higher grades. Evidently many were shipped to Nova Scotia, as contemporary newspaper articles from that time mention them as circulating among the merchants in Halifax.

== Design ==
One of the rights claimed by Coffin was the right to coin money, and he ordered the minting of pennies by Edward Thomason of Birmingham, from a design possibly made by the engraver Thomas Halliday, who is known to have worked with Thomason at this time. The obverse of the coin depicts a seal on an ice floe. It is inscribed 'MAGDALEN ISLAND TOKEN' with date '1815' appearing at the bottom. The reverse of the coin depicts a filleted cod and its inscription says 'SUCCESS TO THE FISHERY', followed by the denomination of 'ONE PENNY'. The cod and the inscription on the reverse refers to the fishing industry that was essential to the islands' economy.

== Numismatic study ==
An example of the Magdalen Island penny token is first mentioned in a catalog compiled by Thomas Sharp of the collection of Sir George Chetwynd. Sharp described the token's edge as "engrailed-Halliday", mentioning the name of Thomas Halliday, who is thought to have created the dies for the token. It is also mentioned in the third volume of Josef Neumann's extensive survey of copper coinage published in 1863.

Canadian numismatist R. W. McLachlan wrote about the Magdalen Island penny token in his Canadian Numismatics in 1886, saying "of its history I have not been able to learn anything, but believe it was imported by some of the large fish dealers for change, which at that time was scarce on the islands." He returned to this subject in a later article published in "The Canadian Antiquarian and Numismatic Journal", where he discovered that the production of the token was described in the memoirs of Sir Edward Thomason, who said that he undertook the following work during 1815:

I had manufactured this year a large quantity of tokens for Admiral Sir Isaac Coffin, Bart., who is the sole possessor and king, as he called himself, of the Magdalen islands, situated in the Gulf of St. Lawrence, in North America. They were principally of copper, pence and half-pence. ...as soon as a large quantity of these were struck off, Sir Isaac sailed off with them, packed up in casks, and took with him a powerful coining press and machinery, and dies ready engraved, to establish what he called a little mint for his subjects, to manufacture their coin for the future...

McLachlan noted that no specimen of this half-pence token described by Thomason had come to light, and suggested that Thomason mis-remembered having struck them for Isaac. McLachlan further speculated that Coffin was in a hurry, and sent the dies for the half penny along with the minting press with the intention of minting that token on the island, and that the coining press and dies for that other token were never used. There are no known extant examples of the half penny Magdalen token, but a recent survey of numismatic sales relating to this token found a catalog sale from 1871 that mentioned two examples of the half penny (not illustrated), both listed in "Fine" condition. These two examples have not subsequently resurfaced, and the sale catalog was criticized the following year in an American coin collector's magazine for its extensive typographical errors.

Canadian numismatist Pierre-Napoléon Breton illustrated the penny token in his book Illustrated History of Coins and Tokens Relating to Canada (1890), placing it first among the Quebec series of tokens, and numbering it as 520 in his catalog. In this book he also mentions its origins with Sir Isaac Coffin, and says that the coins were chiefly distributed on the island "by way of loans among the chief men in the Islands". He gave its rarity (on a 10-point scale, with "10" being the rarest), as 2½.

More modern studies of the token find that it is rare in Fine condition or better, and that uncirculated business strikes are rarer than the few proofs that were minted. It is thought that the tokens were produced from a single set of dies, with some of the proof specimens showing signs of having been recut.

== Bibliography ==
- McLachlan, R. W. (April 1886). "The Magdalen Islands Coinage". The Canadian Antiquarian and Numismatic Journal. 13 (2): 78–80.
- Breton, P. N. (1894). Illustrated History of Coins and Tokens Relating to Canada. P.N. Breton & Co.
- Kleeberg, John M., ed. (2016). Canada's Money. American Numismatic Society. ISBN 9780897222525.
- McLachlan, R. W. (1886). Canadian Numismatics: A Descriptive Catalogue of Coins, Tokens and Medals Issued or Relating to the Dominion of Canada and Newfoundland. Privately printed for the author.
- Neumann, Josef (1863). Beschreibung der bekanntesten Kupfermünzen Vol. 3. Eigenthum und verlag des verfassers.
- Thomason, Sir Edward (1845). Sir Edward Thomason's Memoirs During Half a Century Vol. 1. Longman, Brown, Green, and Longmans.
- Willey, Robert C. (2011). The Annotated Colonial Coinages of Canada. PetchNet.
