= Quebec Route 199 =

Highway in Quebec, Canada

Route 199

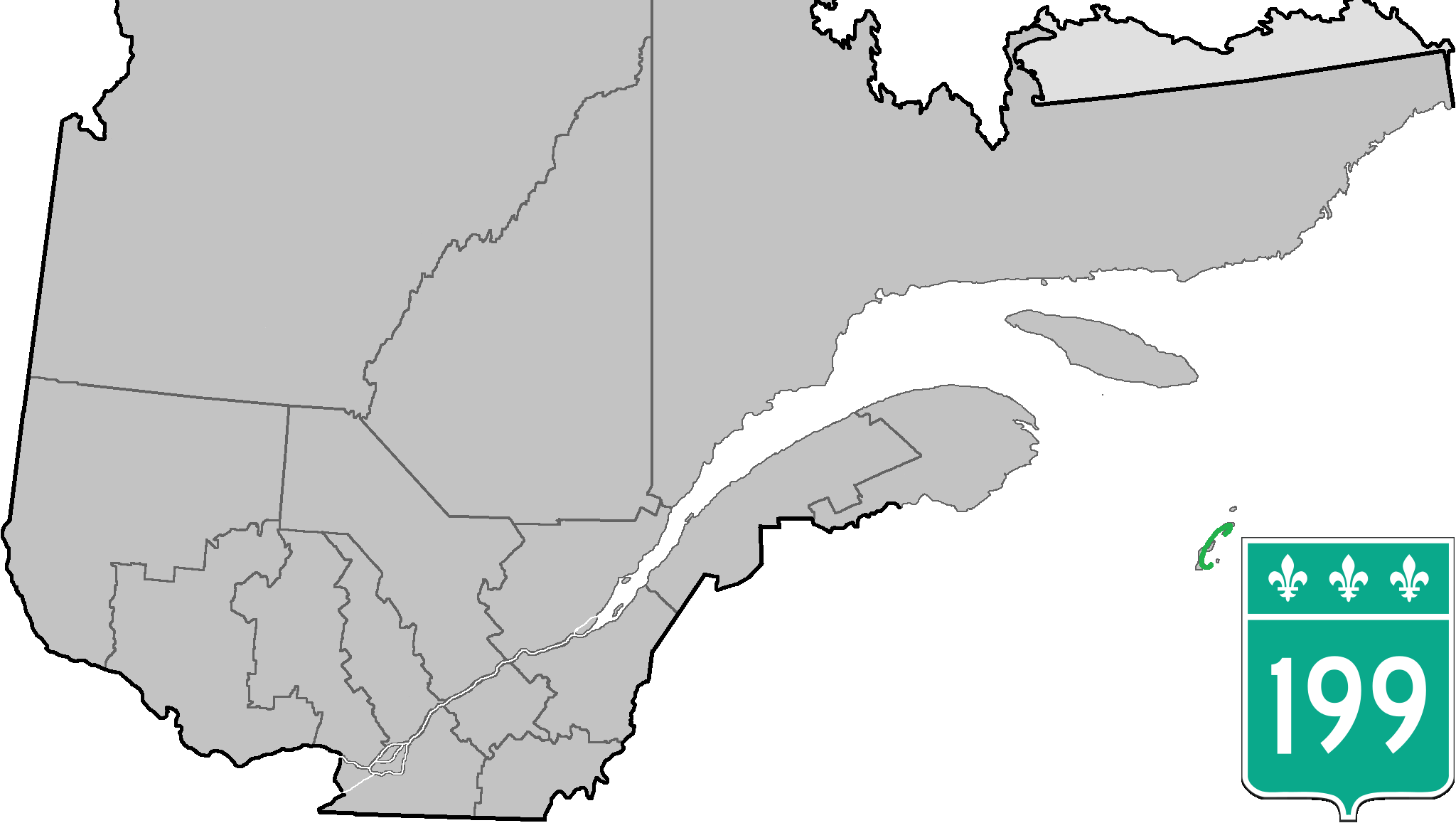

Route information
- Maintained by Transports Québec
- Length: 84.7 km (52.6 mi)

Major junctions
- South end: in Les Îles-de-la-Madeleine (L'Île-du-Havre-Aubert)
- North end: in Les Îles-de-la-Madeleine (Grande-Entrée)

Location
- Country: Canada
- Province: Quebec
- Major cities: Les Îles-de-la-Madeleine, Grosse-Île

Highway system
- Quebec provincial highways; Autoroutes; List; Former
← R-198	→ R-201

Route 199 is an 84.7 km (52.6 mi) north–south highway located on the Magdalen Islands, in the Gulf of Saint Lawrence. Stretching from Les Îles-de-la-Madeleine's communities of L'Île-du-Havre-Aubert to Grande-Entrée, the route is the main artery of the archipelago and is the only Quebec numbered highway that is detached from the rest of the network.

== Municipalities along Route 199 ==
- Les Îles-de-la-Madeleine (L'Île-du-Havre-Aubert / L'Étang-du-Nord / Cap-aux-Meules / Fatima / Havre-aux-Maisons / Pointe-aux-Loups)
- Grosse-Île
- Les Îles-de-la-Madeleine (Grande-Entrée)

== See also ==
- List of Quebec provincial highways
