= Havre-aux-Maisons =

Village in Les Îles-de-la-Madeleine, Quebec, Canada

Coordinates: 47°24′10″N 61°49′00″W

Havre-aux-Maisons (French pronunciation: [avʁ o mɛzɔ̃]) is a village on House Harbour Island (Île du Havre aux Maisons), in the municipality of Les Îles-de-la-Madeleine. It is part of the Magdalen Islands archipelago, in the Gulf of St. Lawrence, Quebec, Canada.

The first settlers came to Havre-aux-Maisons in 1765, from Acadia. The island was first known as Allright Island, then Alwright, and then Saunders, after Sir Charles Saunders, a British admiral who accompanied General James Wolfe to Quebec City in 1759. The harbour between Grindstone and House Harbour islands was already known in 1756 as Harbour Maison. Since the island did not have any permanent inhabitants before 1765, the singular form for Maison could be attributed to the ruins of a habitation built by early Basque visitors and found by French explorers in 1663. Its population, as of 2006, was 2,078.

Îles-de-la-Madeleine Airport, Magdalen Islands' only port of entry by air, is located at Havre-aux-Maisons.

The hamlet of Dune-du-Sud, northeast of Havre-aux-Maisons, is a Hydro-Québec experimentation site to assess power lines' resistance to high winds. In 1993, it built a vertical-axis windmill, but the project did not go past the experimental stage. The windmill is now purely decorative.
