= Cégep de la Gaspésie et des Îles =

Public college in Gaspé, Quebec

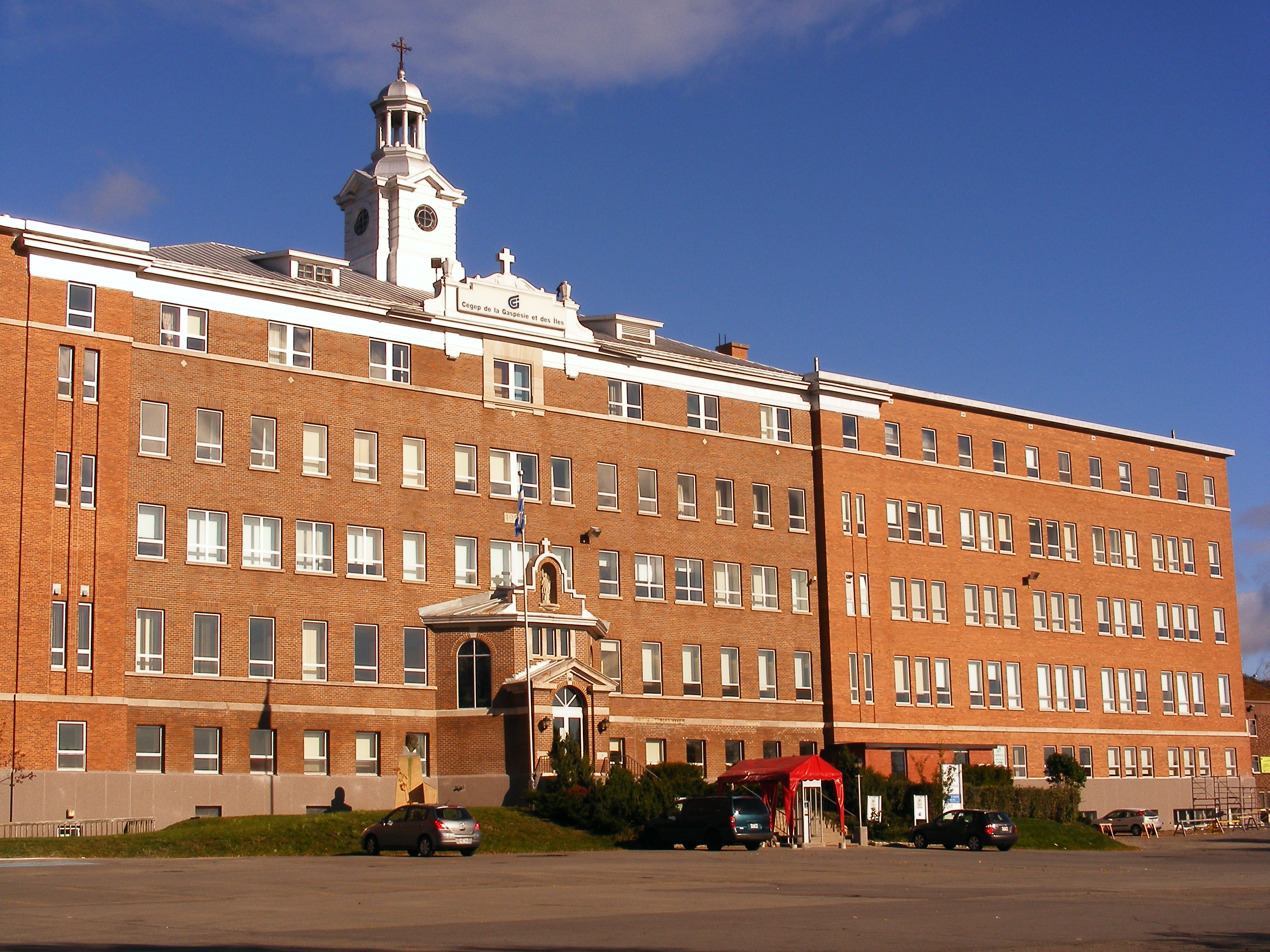
- Motto: Un lieu de formation grandeur nature (French)
- Motto in English: A great natural environment in which to study
- Type: Public CEGEP
- Established: 1967
- Academic affiliations: ACCC
- Director: Yves Galipeau
- Students: 3000
- Location: Gaspé, Quebec, Canada; 48°50′0″N 64°29′3″W
- Campus: Waterfront - Gulf of St. Lawrence, faces Forillon National Park
- Colours: Blue, white, black
- Sporting affiliations: CCAA,
- Website: cegepgim.ca

Cégep de la Gaspésie et des Îles is a bilingual college of general and vocational education (known by the French acronym CEGEP), with an English section, in Gaspé, Quebec, Canada. The CEGEP is affiliated with the ACCC, and CCAA.

== Campus ==
The principal campus in Gaspé. It has five campuses, in Gaspé, Carleton, Grande-Rivière, Îles-de-la-Madeleine and Montreal.

The Fisheries Centre is in Grande-Rivière, Quebec. The Centre d'études Collégiales des Îles is in the Magdalen Islands. The Centre d'études Collégiales is in Carleton-sur-Mer, Quebec. The Montreal Campus was created in partnership with the private Matrix College to welcome international students and only offers courses in English.

== Mission ==
The mission is to offer general and professional collegial level education.

== History ==
The Ministry of Education for Quebec was created in 1964. The regional school commissions of the Baie-des-Chaleurs, and the Peninsula were created in 1964 to serve the Gaspésie–Îles-de-la-Madeleine region at the primary and high school level. In 1967, several institutions were merged and became public ones, when the Quebec system of CEGEPs was created, a network of public colleges throughout the province. In Quebec City, the ministry decided against a public college in the Gaspésie. Consequently, students were to be sent to the Collège de Rimouski for highschool. The Centre spécialisé des pêches in Grande-Rivière was founded in 1983. The Centre des Îles was created in the Magdalen Islands in 1983. In 1989 the Centre de Carleton was created in the Chaleur Bay. The University du Québec in Rimouski (UQAR) decentralized its teaching and developed part-time programs between La Pocatière and Gaspé, including the Magdalen Islands and the Hauterive area since 1969. In 1971, a partnership agreement was signed between UQAR and the continuing education college services regarding adult education. In 1974 the UQAR began to decentralize part-time education. Three regional offices: in Gaspé, Carleton and Matane were created. In 2015, the Cégep de la Gaspésie et des Iles formed a partnership with Matrix College of Management, Technology and Healthcare Inc., a private college, to open its Montreal Campus. The campus offers programs in business, technology and healthcare.

In 2020, the CEGEP attracted controversy regarding its practice of recruiting Indian students.

== Programs ==
The CEGEP offers two types of programs: pre-university and technical. The pre-university programs, which take two years to complete, cover the subject matters which roughly correspond to the additional year of high school given elsewhere in Canada in preparation for a chosen field in university. The technical programs, which take three-years to complete, apply to students who wish to pursue a skilled trade. In addition, continuing education and services to business are provided.

== See also ==
- List of colleges in Quebec
- Higher education in Quebec
