= Communauté métropolitaine de Québec =

Communauté métropolitaine de Québec Quebec Metropolitan Community
- Metropolitan area
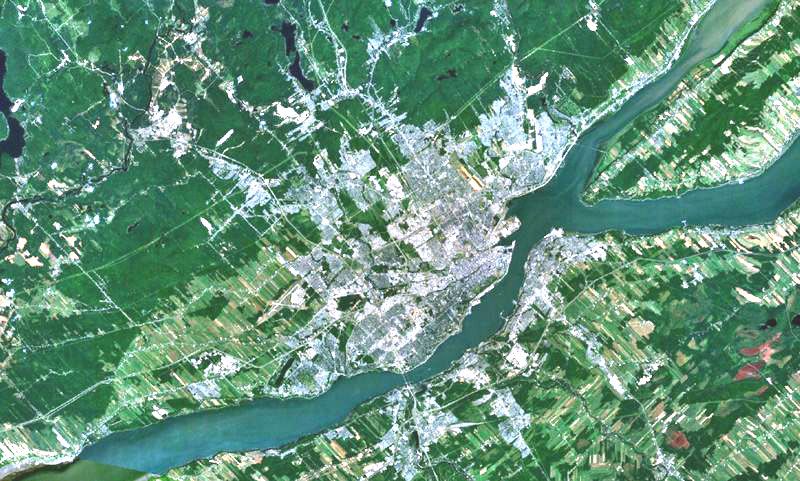
- Satellite image of the Communauté métropolitaine de Québec

- Capital National
- Coordinates: 46°49′N 71°13′W
- Country: Canada
- Province: Quebec

Area
  - Total: 3,499.46 km^{2} (1,351.15 sq mi)

Population (2021)
  - Total: 839,311
  - Density: 239.8/km^{2} (621/sq mi)

GDP
  - Quebec CMA: CA$47.9 billion (2020)
- Time zone: UTC-5 (EST)
  - Summer (DST): UTC-4 (EDT)
- Postal code prefixes: G
- Area codes: 418, 581

The Communauté métropolitaine de Québec (French pronunciation: [kɔmynote metʁɔpɔlitɛn də kebɛk], CMQ), or Quebec Metropolitan Community, is an administrative division of the province of Quebec, comprising the metropolitan area of Quebec City and Lévis. The CMQ is one of the two metropolitan communities of Quebec.

== Predecessor ==
Effective January 1, 1970, the Québec Urban Community (French: Communauté urbaine de Québec) ("CUQ") was established, which governed the area surrounding Quebec City on the north shore of the St. Lawrence River. Together with the CUQ, the Québec Urban Community Transit Commission (French: Commission de transport de la Communauté urbaine de Québec) ("CTCUQ") and the Greater Québec Water Purification Board (French: Bureau d'assainissement des eaux du Québec Métropolitain) ("BAEQM") were also established. Each of the three covered different groups of municipalities:

Québec area municipalities served by new agencies (1970)
Historical county	Municipality	CUQ	CTCUQ	BAEQM
Quebec County	Town of L'Ancienne-Lorette	✓	✓	✓
Quebec County	Beauport	✓	✓	✓
Quebec County	Bélair	✓		✓
Quebec County	Charlesbourg	✓	✓	✓
Quebec County	Charlesbourg-Est	✓	✓	✓
Quebec County	Charlesbourg-Ouest	✓	✓	✓
Quebec County	Courville	✓	✓	✓
Quebec County	Duberger	✓	✓	✓
Quebec County	Giffard	✓	✓	✓
Quebec County	Lac-Saint-Charles	✓	✓	✓
Quebec County	Parish of L'Ancienne-Lorette	✓	✓	✓
Quebec County	Loretteville	✓	✓	✓
Quebec County	Montmorency	✓	✓	✓
Quebec County	Neufchâtel	✓	✓	✓
Quebec County	Notre-Dame-des-Laurentides	✓	✓	✓
Quebec County	Orsainville	✓	✓	✓
Quebec County	Quebec	✓	✓	✓
Quebec County	Saint-Dunstan-du-Lac-Beauport			✓
Quebec County	Sainte-Foy	✓	✓	✓
Quebec County	Saint-Émile	✓	✓	✓
Quebec County	Sainte-Thérèse-de-Lisieux	✓	✓	✓
Quebec County	Saint-Félix-du-Cap-Rouge	✓	✓	
Quebec County	Sillery	✓	✓	
Quebec County	Val-St-Michel	✓		✓
Quebec County	Vanier	✓	✓	✓
Quebec County	Villeneuve	✓	✓	✓
Portneuf County	Saint-Augustin-de-Desmaures	✓		
Montmorency No 1 County	Saint-Jean-de-Boischatel		✓	

== Formation ==
Boundaries of constituent municipalities of the Communauté urbaine de Québec in 2001, with overlay of Quebec city borough boundaries in 2012

The CUQ was replaced by the CMQ on January 1, 2002. The CMQ exercised jurisdiction over a wider geographical area.

Quebec was amalgamated with the cities of Beauport, Cap-Rouge, Charlesbourg, L'Ancienne-Lorette, Lac-Saint-Charles, Loretteville, Saint-Émile, Sainte-Foy, Sillery, Val-Bélair, Vanier and Saint-Augustin-de-Desmaures. In the 2006 demerger, L'Ancienne-Lorette and Saint-Augustin-de-Desmaures regained separate status.

Lévis was amalgamated with Charny, Saint-Jean-Chrysostome, Saint-Nicolas, Saint-Rédempteur, Saint-Romuald, Pintendre, Saint-Étienne-de-Lauzon, Sainte-Hélène-de-Breakeyville and Saint-Joseph-de-la-Pointe-de-Lévy.

Municipalities in the Quebec Metropolitan Community and Quebec Census Metropolitan Area (CMA)
Regional county municipality or urban agglomeration(where applicable)	In Metropolitan Community	In CMA only
Urban agglomeration of Quebec City	Quebec City (Note: subdivided into the boroughs of Beauport, Charlesbourg, La Cité-Limoilou, La Haute-Saint-Charles, Les Rivières and Sainte-Foy–Sillery–Cap-Rouge); L'Ancienne-Lorette; Saint-Augustin-de-Desmaures	Notre-Dame-des-Anges (Note: enclave within the borough of La Cité-Limoilou, not part of the urban agglomeration); Wendake (Note: Huron-Wendat reserve, an enclave within the borough of La Haute-Saint-Charles, not part of the urban agglomeration)
Lévis (Equivalent territory) (Note: subdivided into the boroughs of Desjardins, Les Chutes-de-la-Chaudière-Ouest and Les Chutes-de-la-Chaudière-Est)		
Bellechasse Regional County Municipality		Beaumont; Saint-Henri
La Côte-de-Beaupré Regional County Municipality	Beaupré (Note: not part of the CMA); Boischatel; Château-Richer; L'Ange-Gardien; Sainte-Anne-de-Beaupré; Saint-Ferréol-les-Neiges; Saint-Joachim; Saint-Louis-de-Gonzague-du-Cap-Tourmente; Saint-Tite-des-Caps	
L'Île-d'Orléans Regional County Municipality	Sainte-Famille-de-l'Île-d'Orléans; Saint-François-de-l'Île-d'Orléans; Saint-Jean-de-l'Île-d'Orléans; Saint-Laurent-de-l'Île-d'Orléans; Sainte-Pétronille; Saint-Pierre-de-l'Île-d'Orléans	
La Jacques-Cartier Regional County Municipality	Fossambault-sur-le-Lac; Lac-Beauport; Lac-Delage; Lac-Saint-Joseph; Sainte-Brigitte-de-Laval; Sainte-Catherine-de-la-Jacques-Cartier; Saint-Gabriel-de-Valcartier; Shannon; Stoneham-et-Tewkesbury	
La Nouvelle-Beauce Regional County Municipality		Saint-Lambert-de-Lauzon
Lotbinière Regional County Municipality		Saint-Antoine-de-Tilly; Saint-Apollinaire
Portneuf Regional County Municipality		Neuville

== Gallery ==
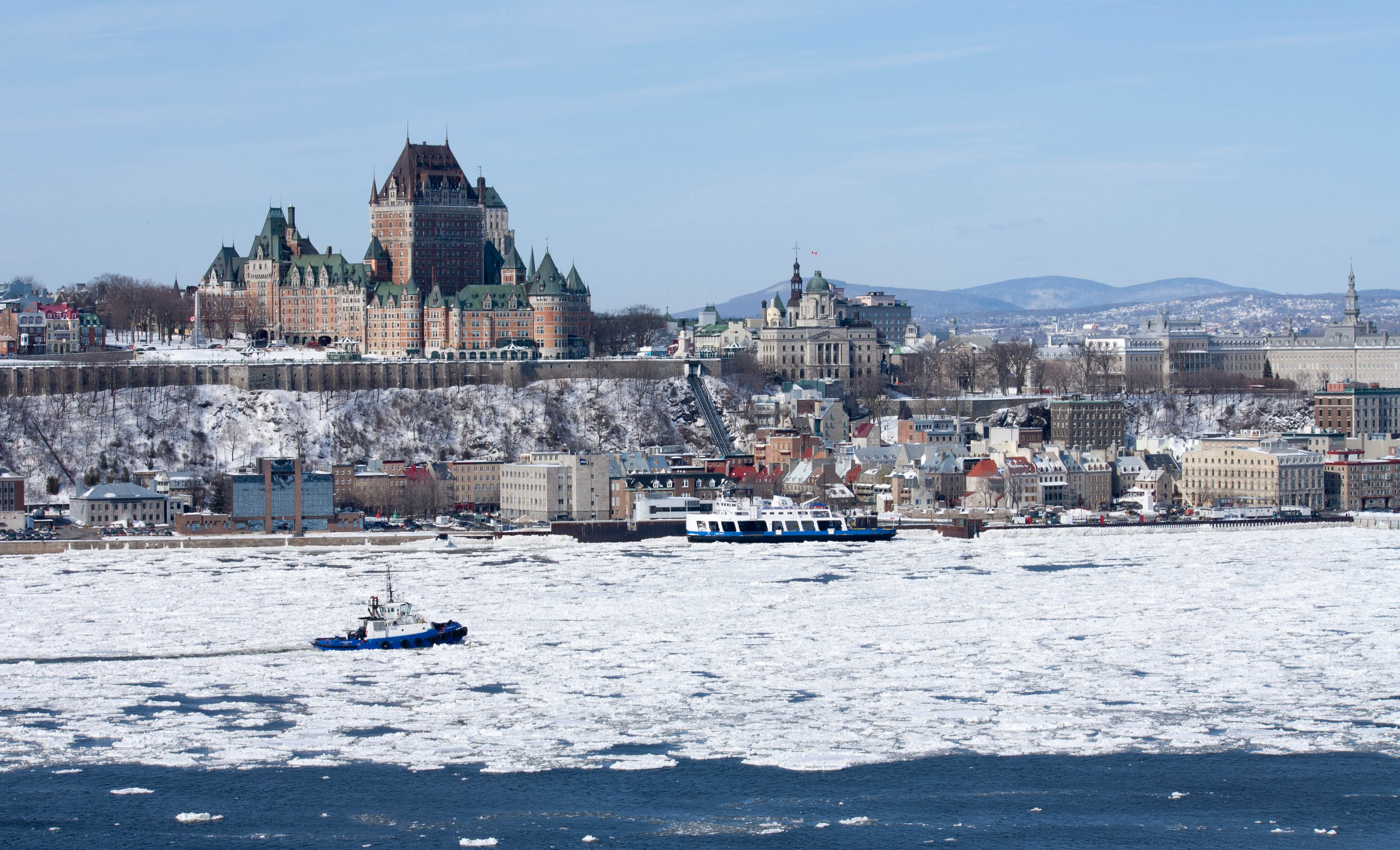
Québec

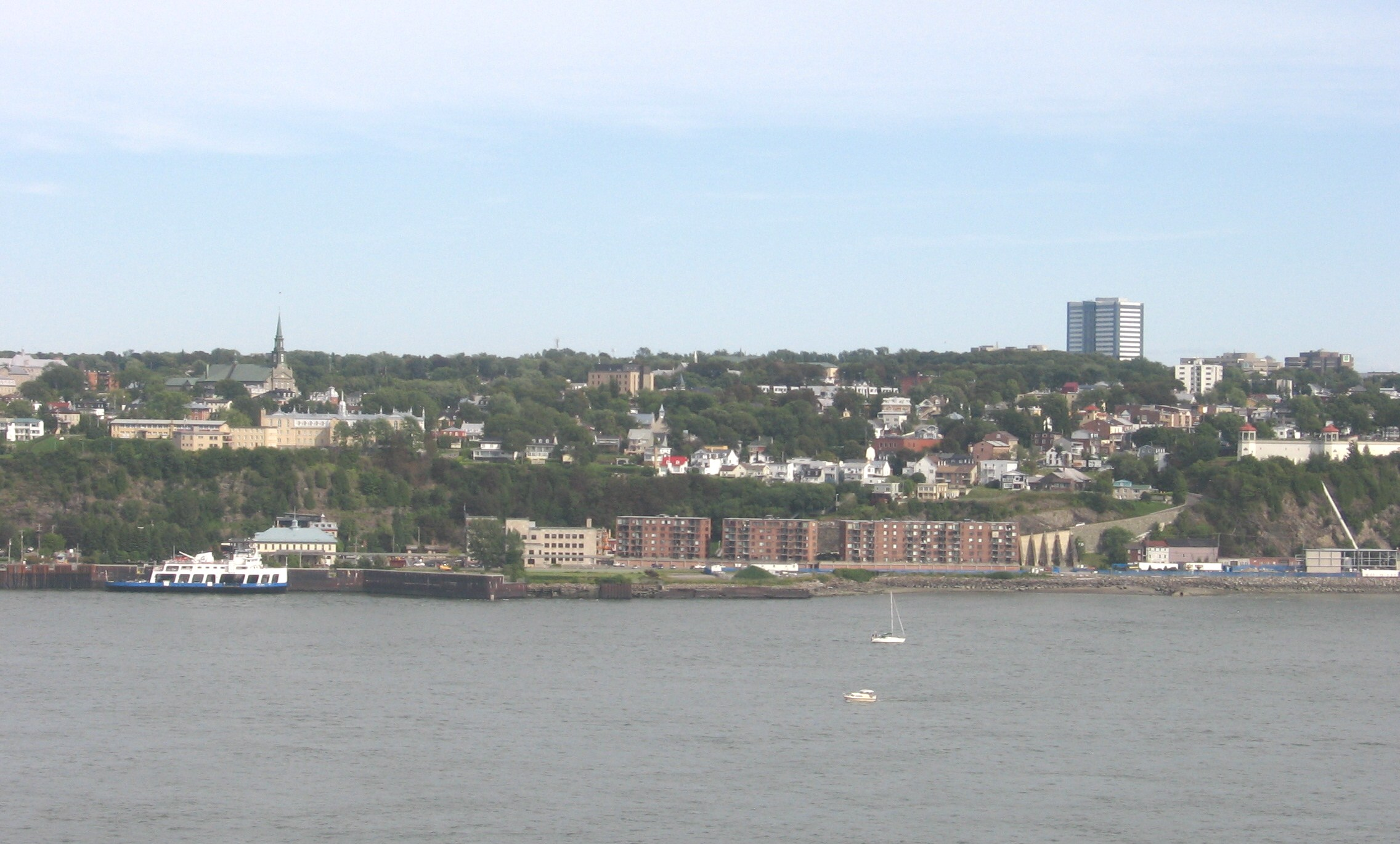
Lévis

Boroughs of Quebec City prior to October 31, 2009.

Boroughs of Quebec City, effective November 1, 2009.

Canada Census Mother Tongue – Quebec city, Quebec
Census	Total	French			English			French & English			Other		
Year	Responses	Count	Trend	Pop %	Count	Trend	Pop %	Count	Trend	Pop %	Count	Trend	Pop %
2016	800,296	741,010	▲3.24%%	92.62%	10,965	▲1.06%	1.41%	3,775	▲14.56%	0.49%	29,900	▲35.41%	5.04%
2011	765,706	717,770	▲6.94%%	93,74%	10,850	▲5.85%	1.42%	3,295	▲55.06%	0.43%	22,080	▲6.87%	2.88%
2006	704,185	671,145	▲3.59%	95.31%	10,250	▲5.13%	1.46%	2,125	▼21.73%	0.3%	20,660	▲77.18%	2.93%
2001	673,100	647,920	▲1.7%	96,14%	9,750	▼18.31%	1.44%	2,715	▲6.6%	0.40%	11,665	▲5.19%	1.73%
1996	671,889	637,150	n/a	94,83%	11,935	n/a	1.77%	2,545	n/a	0.37%	11,080	n/a	1.64%
