= Communauté urbaine de Québec =

Québec Urban Community
- Dissolved Region
- Flag Logo

- The CUQ at the time of its creation
- Country: Canada
- Province: Quebec
- Established: 1970
- Dissolved: 2001 into the megacity
- Time zone: UTC−04:00 (EST)

The Communauté urbaine de Québec (also known as the Québec Urban Community) was a regional municipal body that existed in the area around Quebec City from 1970 to 2001.

== Formation ==
=== Rationale for reorganization ===
In the late 1960s, the Government of Quebec saw increasing problems arising in the governance of the urban areas of Quebec City, Montreal and Hull because of the system of municipal organization in effect at that time:

- disparities between how municipalities were structured, in contrast with socioeconomic realities,
- unequal levels of service between different municipalities,
- disparities arising from the differences in local fiscal capacity,
- difficulties in local planning, and
- local parochialism that discouraged collective action.

The current remedies involving intermunicipal agreements, amalgamation and annexation were seen as being inadequate, as they were discretionary and piecemeal in nature. The Province opted to establish "urban communities" in all three areas, which would possess mandatory and optional powers appropriate to each. A particular concern in the Quebec area was the large presence of government agencies whose exemption from property taxes created a significant revenue shortfall to the municipalities, together with the need to strengthen intermunicipal cooperation to deal with the situation. This was confirmed in the debate on the implementing bill, where then Minister of Municipal Affairs Robert Lussier stated that the reform was "aimed at economies of scale through administrative centralization, and at reducing futile rivalries between municipalities." The move was supported by all MLAs in the Quebec area, including former Premier Jean Lesage and former Créditiste member Gaston Tremblay.

This was not the first consolidation effort the Province had undertaken at the local level, as local school boards had already gone through something similar in the early 1960s. Officials at the local level had already begun discussions as early as 1965 on possible ways to establish joint activities, but nothing concrete had emerged by the time the Province unveiled its draft bill in June 1969. Although Quebec City itself was favourable to the provincial proposal, there was significant opposition from the other municipalities in the area, but such tension tended to fade away over the five years following the CUQ's creation.

=== Creation ===
Boundaries of constituent municipalities of the Communauté urbaine de Québec at creation, with related sectors for membership on its executive committee

Effective January 1, 1970, the Communauté urbaine de Québec (English: Québec Urban Community) (Note: the English language name was abolished in 1977, upon the passage of the Charter of the French Language) ("CUQ") was established, which governed the area surrounding Quebec City on the north shore of the St. Lawrence River. Together with the CUQ, the Commission de transport de la Communauté urbaine de Québec (English: Québec Urban Community Transit Commission) ("CTCUQ") (Note: now part of the Réseau de transport de la Capitale) and the Bureau d'assainissement des eaux du Québec Métropolitain (English: Greater Québec Water Purification Board) ("BAEQM") (Note: previously constituted under the Greater Québec Water Purification Board Act, S.Q. 1968, c. 56) (Note: subsequently amalgamated with the CUQ in June 1971: An Act to amend the Québec Urban Community Act, S.Q. 1971, c. 88, s. 79) were also established. Each of the three covered different groups of municipalities:

== Evolution ==
Evolution of Québec area municipalities served by new agencies (1970-2001)
Historical county	Municipalities in 1970	At formation (1970)			Municipalities in 2001
Historical county	Municipalities in 1970	CUQ	CTCUQ	BAEQM	Municipalities in 2001
Quebec County	Beauport	✓	✓	✓	Beauport
Quebec County	Courville	✓	✓	✓	Beauport
Quebec County	Giffard	✓	✓	✓	Beauport
Quebec County	Montmorency	✓	✓	✓	Beauport
Quebec County	Sainte-Thérèse-de-Lisieux	✓	✓	✓	Beauport
Quebec County	Villeneuve	✓	✓	✓	Beauport
Quebec County	Saint-Félix-du-Cap-Rouge	✓	✓		Cap-Rouge
Quebec County	Charlesbourg	✓	✓	✓	Charlesbourg
Quebec County	Charlesbourg-Est	✓	✓	✓	Charlesbourg
Quebec County	Notre-Dame-des-Laurentides	✓	✓	✓	Charlesbourg
Quebec County	Orsainville	✓	✓	✓	Charlesbourg
Quebec County	Saint-Dunstan-du-Lac-Beauport			✓	Lac-Beauport
Quebec County	Town of L'Ancienne-Lorette	✓	✓	✓	L'Ancienne-Lorette
Quebec County	Lac-Saint-Charles	✓	✓	✓	Lac-Saint-Charles
Quebec County	Loretteville	✓	✓	✓	Loretteville
Quebec County	Charlesbourg-Ouest	✓	✓	✓	Quebec
Quebec County	Duberger	✓	✓	✓	Quebec
Quebec County	Neufchâtel	✓	✓	✓	Quebec
Quebec County	Quebec	✓	✓	✓	Quebec
Quebec County	Saint-Émile	✓	✓	✓	Saint-Émile
Quebec County	Parish of L'Ancienne-Lorette	✓	✓	✓	Sainte-Foy
Quebec County	Sainte-Foy	✓	✓		Sainte-Foy
Quebec County	Sillery	✓	✓		Sillery
Quebec County	Bélair	✓		✓	Val-Bélair
Quebec County	Val-St-Michel	✓		✓	Val-Bélair
Quebec County	Vanier	✓	✓	✓	Vanier
Portneuf County	Saint-Augustin-de-Desmaures	✓			Saint-Augustin-de-Desmaures
Montmorency No 1 County	Saint-Jean-de-Boischatel		✓		Boischatel

In the years following the establishing of the CUQ, various changes occurred among the constituent municipalities:

- on July 1, 1970, Duberger amalgamated with Quebec
- on December 9, 1970, the Parish of L'Ancienne-Lorette was amalgamated with Sainte-Foy
- on January 1, 1971, Neufchâtel amalgamated with Quebec,
- on May 1, 1973, Quebec annexed Charlesbourg-Ouest
- On January 1, 1974, Bélair and Val-St-Michel amalgamated to form Val-Bélair
- on January 1, 1976, Charlesbourg-Est, Notre-Dame-des-Laurentides and Orsainville amalgamated with Charlesbourg, and Courville, Giffard, Montmorency, Sainte-Thérèse-de-Lisieux and Villeneuve, together with the Parish of Saint-Michel-Archange, (Note: a parish municipality erected in 1896, whose sole inhabitants were the Sœurs de la Charité de Québec, who occupied and managed the Hôpital Saint-Michel-Archange, a mental hospital that was later renamed as the Centre hospitalier Robert-Giffard in 1996)amalgamated with Beauport
- on April 27, 1983, Saint-Félix-du-Cap-Rouge changed its name to Cap-Rouge

When the CUQ was created, the remaining territory of Quebec County was not affected, which included unorganized territory and the municipalities of Lac-Delage, Lac-Édouard, Saint-Dunstan-du-Lac-Beauport, Saint-Gabriel-de-Valcartier and Stoneham-et-Tewkesbury. In 1981, they were divided between the new regional county municipalities of Le Haut-Saint-Maurice and La Jacques-Cartier.

== Governance ==
=== Council ===
The CUQ was governed by its council, which consisted of the mayor of each constituent municipality. It had a chairman and a vice-chairman, and, where a representative from Quebec City held one of the positions, the other had to be from one of the other municipalities.

=== Executive committee ===
It also had an executive committee, which had similar functions to a board of control found in Ontario. Its members were independently appointed for four-year terms (Note: subject to retaining their elective office: S.Q. 1969, c. 83, s. 71) by the constituent municipalities by sector:

CUQ Executive Committee membership by sector
Sector	Members	Municipalities
1	3	Quebec (Note: Les Saules, originally intended to be part of sector 4, was amalgamated with the City of Quebec on January 1, 1970: An Act respecting the amalgamation of the City of Québec and the Town of Les Saules, S.Q. 1969, c. 90)
2	1	Saint-Félix-du-Cap-Rouge; Sainte-Foy; Sillery
3	1	Bélair; Lac-Saint-Charles; Loretteville; Neufchâtel; Parish of L'Ancienne-Lorette; Town of L'Ancienne-Lorette; Notre-Dame-des-Laurentides; Saint-Émile; Saint-Augustin-de-Desmaures; Val-St-Michel
4	1	Charlesbourg; Charlesbourg-Est; Charlesbourg-Ouest; Duberger; Orsainville; Vanier
5	1	Beauport; Courville; Giffard; Montmorency; Sainte-Thérèse-de-Lisieux; Villeneuve

Effective January 1, 1994, the executive committee was abolished, and the chairman, 1st vice-chairman and 2nd vice-chairman of the council were declared to be the Mayor of Quebec, a representative from Beauport, Charlesbourg or Sainte-Foy, and a representative from the remaining municipalities (in any order).

== 2002 municipal reorganization ==
Effective January 1, 2002, the CUQ, together with its constituent municipalities, were amalgamated to form the Ville de Québec, which subsequently became part of the new Communauté métropolitaine de Québec.

Boundaries of constituent municipalities of the Communauté urbaine de Québec in 2001, together with overlays of the later Urban agglomeration of Quebec City and Quebec city borough boundaries in 2012
