= History of Quebec City =

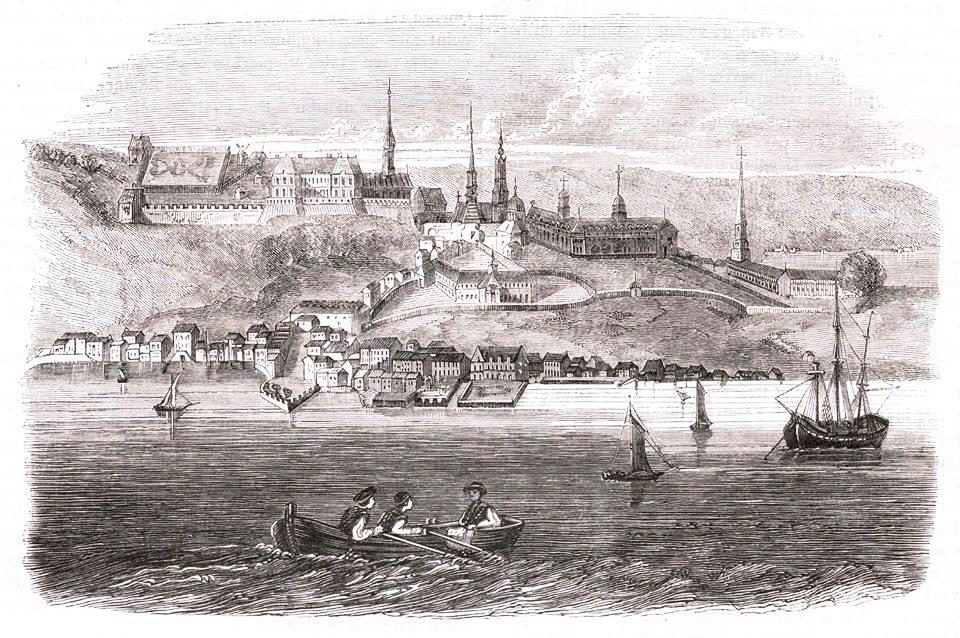
Romanticized depiction of Quebec City in 1720

The history of Quebec City extends back thousands of years, with its first inhabitants being the First Nations peoples of the region. The arrival of French explorers in the 16th century eventually led to the establishment of Quebec City, in present-day Quebec, Canada. The city is one of the oldest European settlements in North America, with the establishment of a permanent trading post in 1608. It was officially incorporated as a city in 1832 and given its charter in 1840.

== French rule ==
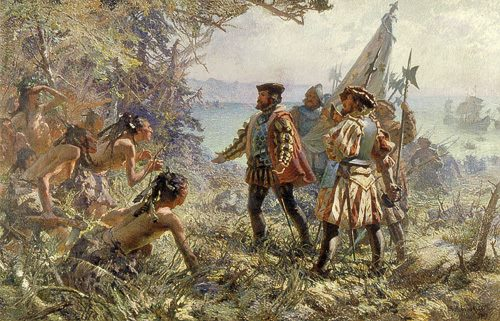
Jacques Cartier's meeting with the indigenous people of Stadacona in 1535

In 1534, French explorer Jacques Cartier became the first European to ascend the Gulf of St. Lawrence, claiming "Canada" for France (and the coming addition of a newly founded "Acadie" – known today as the province of Nova Scotia) to create a dominion known as New France.

In 1535, Cartier and his crew first visited an Iroquois settlement of 500 people named Stadacona, in a site located in present-day Quebec City. He came back in 1541 with some 400 persons to establish Fort Charlesbourg-Royal, the earliest known French settlement in North America (whose site is located in the former town of Cap-Rouge, which merged into Quebec City in 2002). The fort was abandoned a year later in large part due to the hostility of the natives combined with the harsh winter.

After 1543 there were still fur trading activities in the area but it was only 60 years later, on 3 July 1608, that Quebec City (intended as a permanent trading post) was established, on the top and on the foot of Cape Diamant by Samuel de Champlain and Pierre Dugua de Mons. By the time Champlain came to this site, the Iroquois population had disappeared and been replaced by Innu and Algonquins. Champlain and his crew built a wooden fort which they called "l'habitation" within only a few days of their arrival.

One of the strategic advantages of the site was its relative isolation from the competition of other traders active downstream in the Gulf area, as well as its promontory from which could be observed any vessel going further upstream into the continent The word "Kebec" is an Algonquin word meaning "where the river narrows." In 1620, Champlain built Fort Saint-Louis on the top of Cape Diamond, near the present location of the Chateau Frontenac. The town was briefly taken by English troops during the surrender of Quebec, from 1629 to 1632, after which it was returned to France. When the French returned, they noticed that most buildings had been destroyed. The reconstruction started a year later, and Charles de Montmagny, the first governor, was eventually dispatched in the town to oversee the development of the colony

=== Demographics and population ===
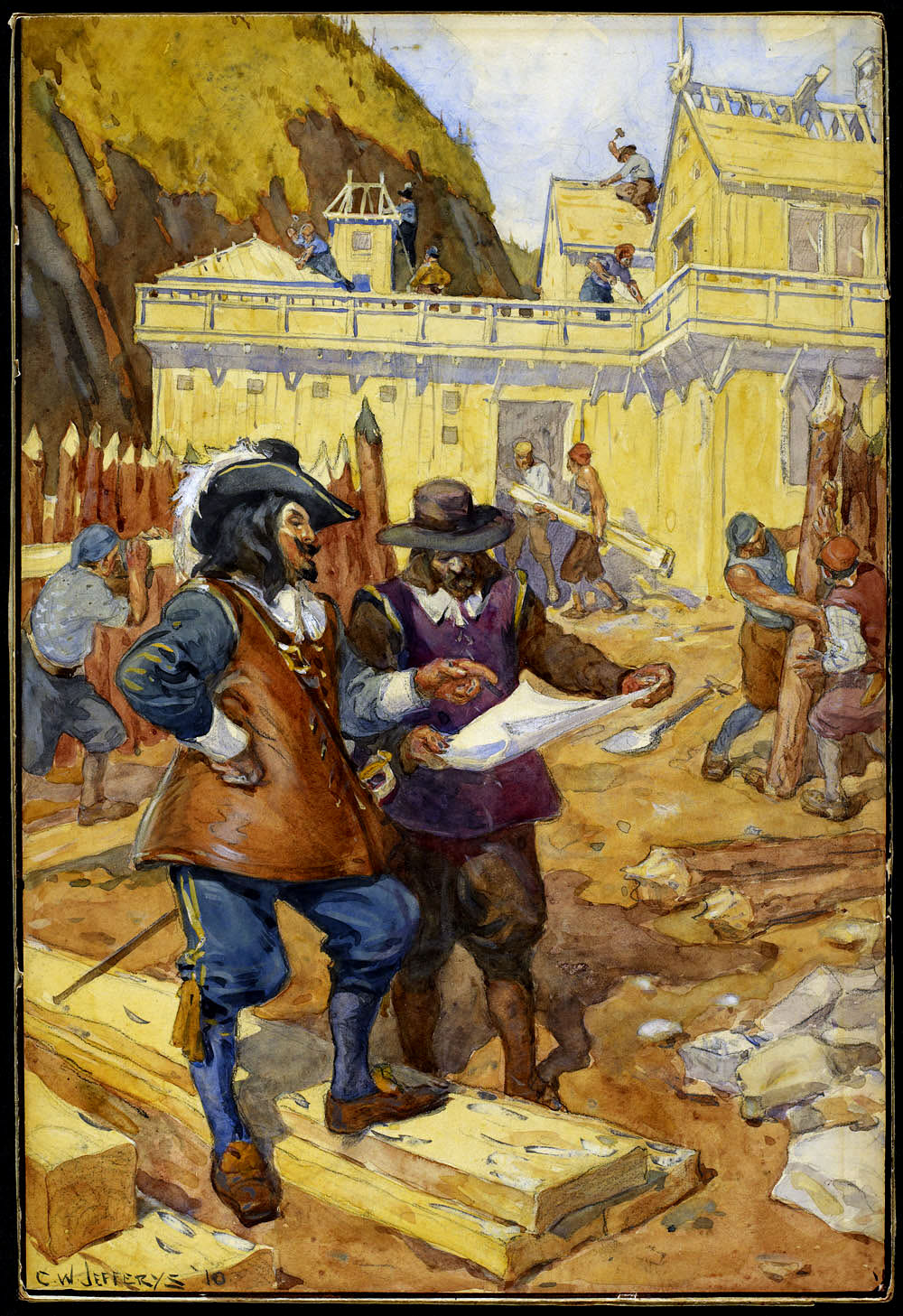
Samuel de Champlain overseeing the construction of the Habitation de Québec, in 1608

After the settlement of Port Royal in Acadia (1605), the next colonization effort by the French occurred in 1608. Samuel de Champlain built "l'Habitation" to house 28 people. However, the first winter proved formidable, and 20 of 28 men died. By 1615, the first four missionaries arrived in Quebec. Among the first successful French settlers were Marie Rollet and her husband, Louis Hébert, credited as "les premier agriculteurs du Canada" by 1617. The first French child born in Quebec was Helene Desportes, in 1620, to Pierre Desportes and Francoise Langlois, whose father was a member of the Hundred Associates.

The population of Quebec City arrived at 100 in 1627, less than a dozen of whom were women. However, with the invasion of Quebec by David Kirke and his brothers in 1628, Champlain returned to France with approximately 60 out of 80 settlers. When the French returned to Quebec in 1632, they constructed a city based on the framework of a traditional French "ville" in which "the 17th century city was a reflection of its society."

Quebec remained an outpost until well into the 1650s. As in other locations throughout New France, the population could be split into the colonial elites, including clergy and government officials, the craftsmen and artisans, and the engagés (indentured servants). Quebec was designed so that the inhabitants of better quality lived in the upper city, closer to the centres of power such as the government and Jesuit college, whereas the lower town was primarily populated by merchants, sailors and artisans. The city contained only about thirty homes in 1650, and one hundred by 1663, for a population of over 500.

Jean Bourdon, the first engineer and surveyor of New France, helped plan the city, almost from his arrival in 1634. However, despite attempts to utilize urban planning, the city quickly outgrew its planned area. Population continually increased, with the city boasting 1300 inhabitants by 1681. The city quickly experienced overcrowding, especially in the lower town, which contained two-thirds of the population of the city by 1700. The numbers became more evenly distributed by 1744, with the lower town housing only a third of the population, and the upper town containing almost half the inhabitants.

By the 18th century, Quebec also saw a rise in the number of rental dwellings, to help accommodate a mobile population of seamen, sailors, and merchants, aptly described by historian Yvon Desloges as "a town of tenants." Thus, Quebec followed a pattern common throughout New France, of immigrants arriving for several years, before returning home to France. As a whole, approximately 27,000 immigrants came to New France during the French regime, only 31.6% of whom remained. Despite this, by the time of British occupation in 1759, New France had evolved to a colony of over 60,000 with Quebec as the principal city.

=== Military and warfare ===
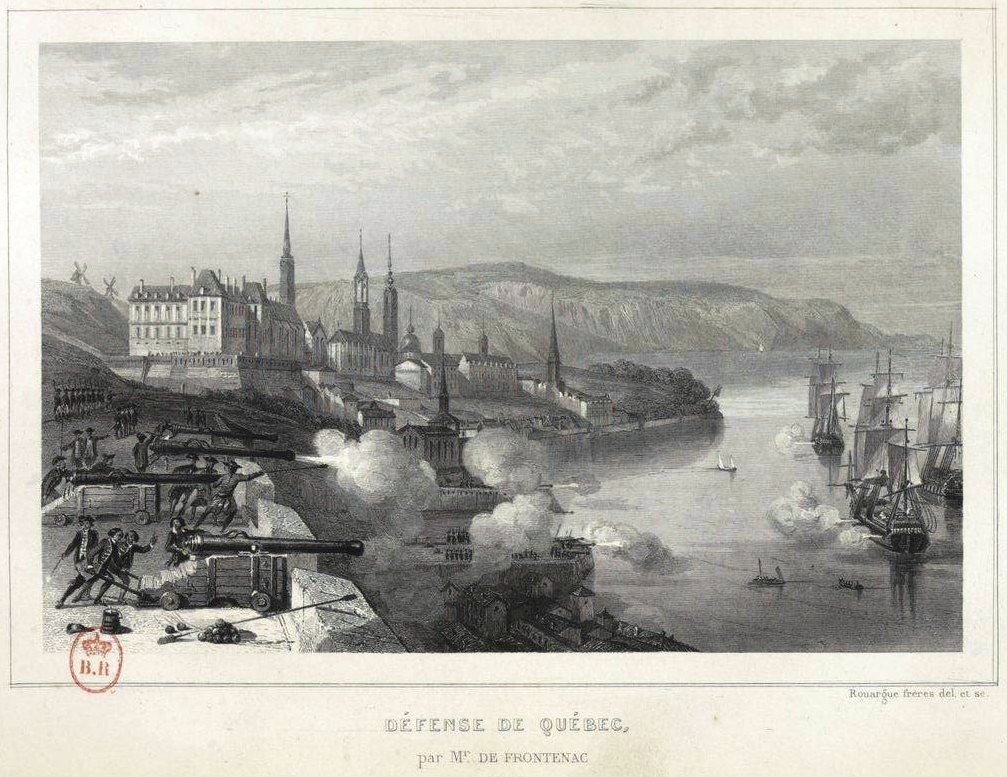
The batteries of Quebec fire on New England ships in the 1690 Battle of Quebec

In 1620, the construction of a wooden fort called Fort Saint-Louis started under the orders of Samuel de Champlain; it was completed in 1626. In 1629, the Kirke brothers under English order took control of Quebec City, holding the town until 1632 when the French resumed possession. In 1662, to save the colony from frequent Iroquois attacks during the Beaver Wars, Louis XIV dispatched one hundred regulars to the colony. Three years later, in 1665, Lieutenant-General de Tracy arrived at Quebec City with four companies of regular troops. Before long, troop strength had risen to 1,300. In 1690, Admiral Phipps' Anglo-American invasion force failed to capture Quebec City during King William's War. Under heavy French artillery fire, the English fleet was considerably damaged and an open battle never took place. After having used most of their ammunition, the English became discouraged and retreated. In 1691, Governor Louis de Buade de Frontenac constructed the Royal Battery.

In 1711, during Queen Anne's War, Admiral Walker's fleet also failed in its attempt to besiege Quebec City, in this case due to a navigational accident. Walker's initial report stated that 884 soldiers perished. This number was later revised to 740.

During the Seven Years' War, in 1759, the British, under the command of General James Wolfe, besieged Quebec City for three months. The city was defended by French general the Marquis de Montcalm. The very short battle of the Plains of Abraham lasted approximately 15 minutes and culminated in a British victory and the surrender of Quebec.

=== Seat of government ===
Quebec City served as the hub of religious and government authority throughout the French period. From 1608 until 1663, Quebec City was the main administrative centre of the Company of New France (see Company of One Hundred Associates). During this period, Quebec City was the home of the company's official representative, the Governor, along with his lieutenant and other administrative officials, and small number of soldiers.

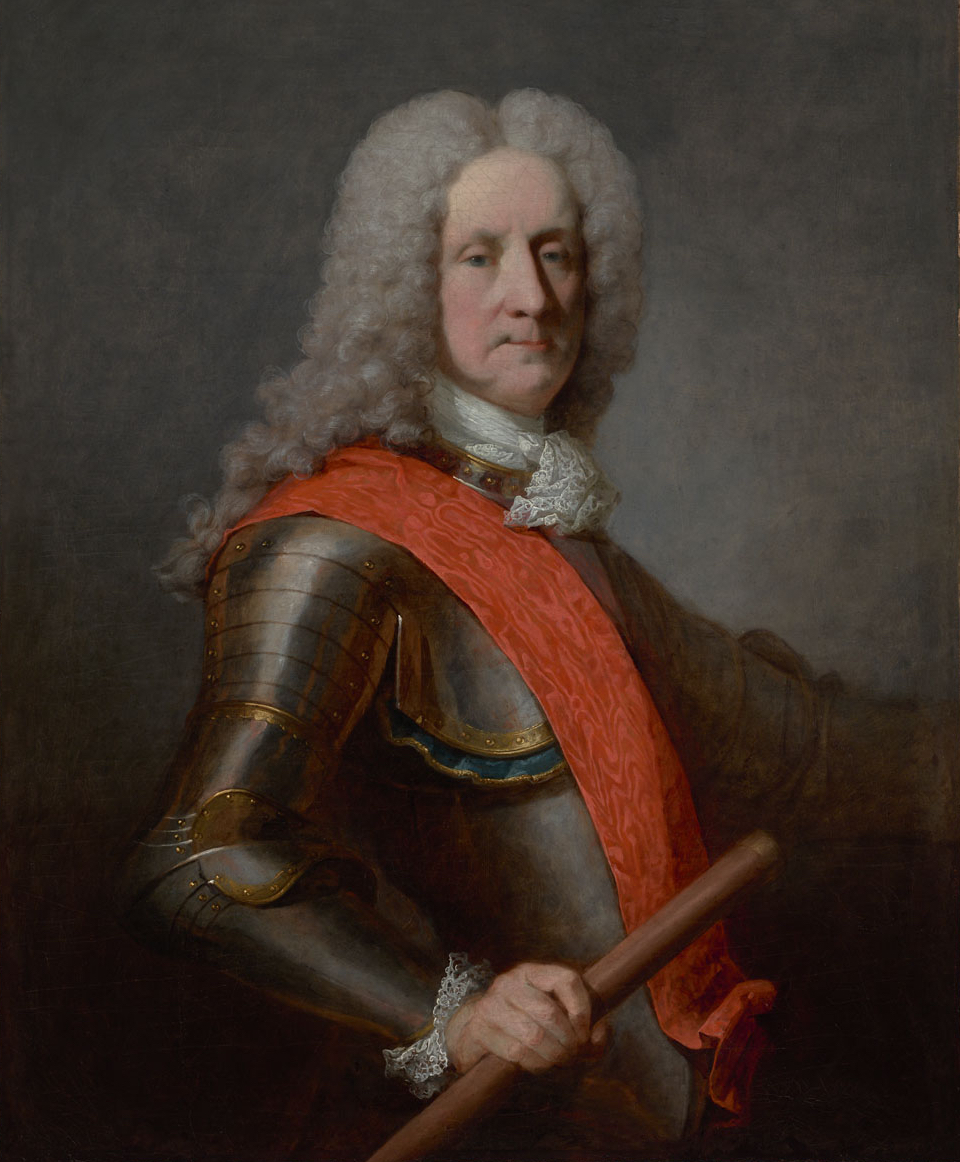
Le Marquis de Beauharnois was the 14th Governor General of New France. New France's administration was centred in Quebec City.

Following the Royal Takeover of 1663 by King Louis XIV and his minister Jean Baptiste Colbert, Quebec City became the seat of a reformed colonial government which included the Governor General of New France, responsible for military and diplomatic matters, and an intendant responsible for administrative functions involving law and finance. Both the governor and the intendant were directly answerable to the Minister of the Navy (Ministres Francais de la Marine et des Colonies) and were appointed by the king of France. The first Governor to arrive in Quebec City directly appointed by the King was Augustin de Saffray de Mésy in 1663.

Quebec City became the seat of Sovereign Council which served legislative and legal functions in the colony through its role in the ratification of royal edicts and as final court of appeal. The Council contained the twin heads of the colonial government: the governor and the intendant (also the chair), along with the bishop of Quebec. Moreover, the council contained a number of colonial elites, usually merchants from Quebec City. Noteworthy is the fact that, under the French regime, Quebec did not have a municipal government; the centralizing Bourbon monarchy was determined to prevent the emergence of autonomous centres of power in the colony, even local city councils.

Quebec City was also the focal point of religious authority in New France and had been since the arrival of the first Recollets missionaries in the city in 1615. Working closely with the State, the Church ensured that the colony remained a well regulated Catholic colony. Quebec City became seat of the bishop in the colony upon the creation of the diocese of Quebec in 1674, with François de Laval as the first bishop.

Quebec City was home to the Seminaire de Quebec, founded by Laval in 1663 when he was Vicar apostolic before becoming bishop. Laval's experience in the role of Vicar Apostolic highlights the complex nature of relationship between Church and State in New France; while allied with the authority of Rome and the Jesuits on account of his position as Vicar Apostolic, Laval also required the approval from a royal government suspicious of Papal power.

Although the State and Church based in Quebec City worked closely together, the dominance of the Crown was retained through the responsibility of the Crown of nominating of the bishop and of supplying a large portion of Church funds.

=== Economics ===
Since Quebec was settled for its location on the St. Lawrence River with a deep-water harbor, shipping and import/exports dominated the economy. As a port city, Quebec ran a flourishing trade with the French West Indies and with ports in France. However, trade was restricted to French vessels only trading in officially French ports. In trade with France, Quebec received wine, textiles and cloth, metal products such as guns and knives, salt, and other small consumer and luxury goods not manufactured in the colony. From the French West Indies, Quebec received sugar, molasses, and coffee. In order to offset its debts, Quebec City exported furs to France, as well as lumber and fish to the West Indies. From 1612 to 1638, 15–20,000 beaver pelts were shipped to France, valued at 75,000 livres. The peace experienced in the early 1720s caused a spike in shipping, with 20 to 80 ships arriving annually at the port of Quebec, with an average of 40 a year. However, Quebec was constantly faced with a trade imbalance, debt, and a certain amount of financial insecurity. As with other colonial societies, there was little hard money throughout the colony. To merchants in Quebec, such a situation proved a particular challenge, as they lacked hard specie, or currency, with which to trade. At one point, the colony began the use of playing cards as money in order to reimburse soldiers and other government employees for services rendered when shipments of hard currency failed to arrive. Contentions that the residents of Quebec were poor merchants have, in recent years, been refuted, as historians describe a sharp business acumen, severely circumscribed by a lack of finances and excessive distance from external markets.

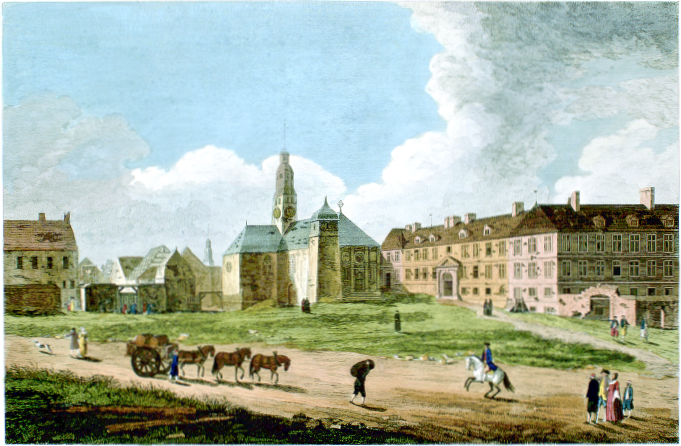
View of the closed Jesuit College in 1761. The college was forced to close in 1759 with the beginning of British rule.

=== Religion ===
The Catholic faith played a significant role in the settling and development of Quebec City. With the first missionaries arriving in 1615, Quebec was, almost from its founding, a Catholic city. Although those of other faiths were permitted to practice their faith in private, the city embraced Catholicism as an integral part of daily life. The Recollets were the first religious order to arrive in 1615, followed by the Jesuits in 1625, who would found a college in Quebec City by 1635. Female religious orders arrived by 1639, with the Ursulines providing education, and the Augustinians servicing the Hôtel-Dieu de Québec. The granting of seigneuries to religious orders helped solidify their place as a facet of society. Indeed, much of the upper town of Quebec came to be held by religious orders. The arrival of Francois de Laval as the vicar apostolic to Quebec in 1658 cemented the place of religion in Quebec City. The city would become a formal parish in 1664, and a diocese by 1674. The Catholic faith not only played a large role in the government and legislation, but also in the social lives of residents. As Quebec City was the seat of religion throughout New France, inhabitants followed the strict schedule of fasting, holy days, and celebrating sacraments, in addition to the censorship of books, dancing, and theatre. After the English invasion of Quebec, the residents were permitted to continue practicing Catholicism under the Act of Quebec in 1774.

== British rule ==
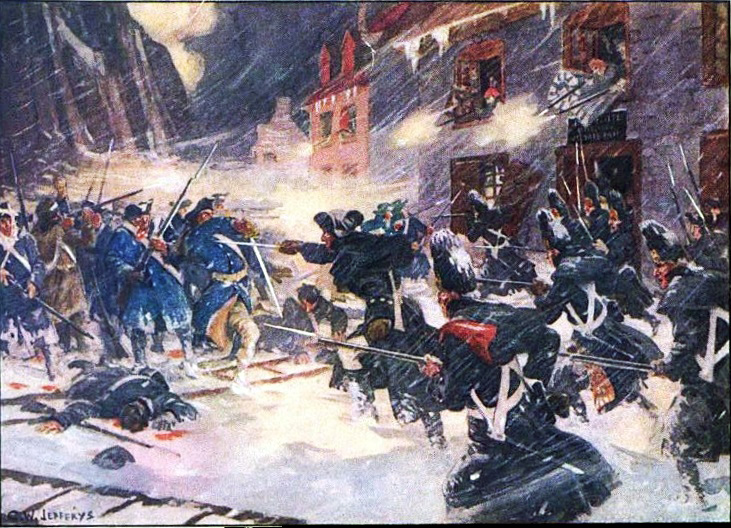
British regulars and Canadian militia engage the Continental Army in the streets of the city. The Americans' failure to take Quebec in 1775 led to the end of their campaign in Canada.

The British and French had co-existed in North America, but the threat of French expansion into the Ohio Valley caused the British to attempt to eradicate New France from the map completely. In the Battle of the Plains of Abraham (1759), the city was permanently lost by the French. In 1763, France formally ceded its claims to le Canada, and Quebec City's French-speaking Catholic population came under the rule of Protestant Britain.

The Quebec Act, passed in 1774, allowed 'les Canadiens' (today, also referred to as the Québécois) to have religious and linguistic freedoms, to openly practice their Catholicism and use their French. The Canadiens were therefore not unhappy enough with British rule to choose to participate in the American Revolution. Without Canadian cooperation against the British, the Thirteen Colonies instead attempted to invade Canada. The city was therefore once again under siege when the Battle of Quebec occurred in 1775. The initial attack was a failure due to American inexperience with the extreme cold temperatures of the city in December. Benedict Arnold refused to accept the defeat in the Battle of Quebec and a siege against the city continued until May 6, 1776, when the American army finally retreated.

The Constitutional Act of 1791 divided Canada into Lower Canada and Upper Canada. The Province of Lower Canada used the French language and laws; Quebec City was made its capital and enjoyed more self-rule following the passage of this act. The city's industry began to grow, and by the early 19th century it was the third largest port city in North America. Lumber was the largest export of the city at this time. The business boom continued for most of the century and Quebec City began welcoming thousands of immigrants.

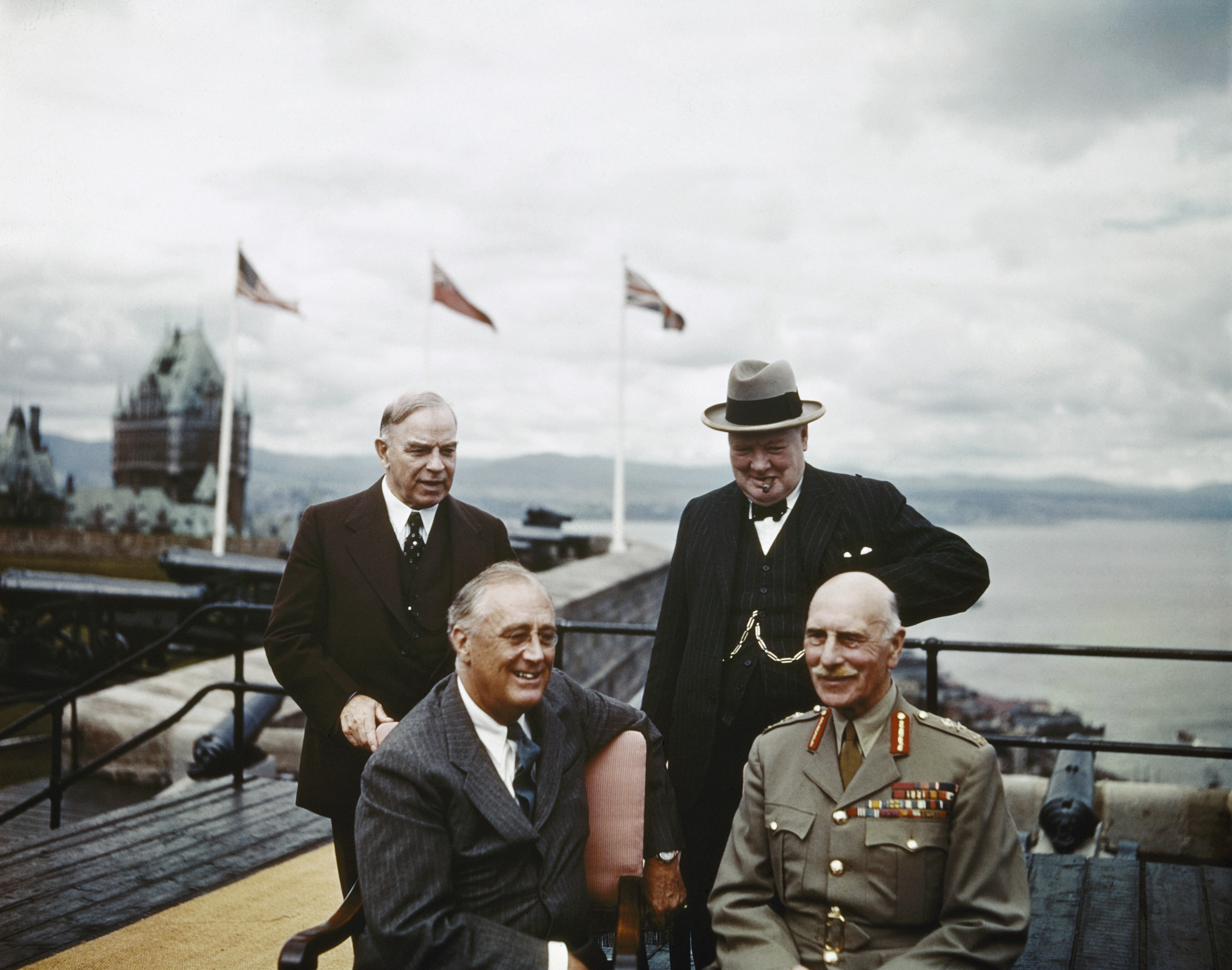
Mackenzie King, Winston Churchill, Franklin Roosevelt, and the Earl of Athlone (left-to-right) at the First Quebec Conference, a secret military conference held in World War II

== 20th century ==
In 1917, the construction of the Quebec Bridge, connecting the north and south banks of the St. Lawrence River, was finished. To this day, it is the longest cantilever bridge in the world, though two collapses of the centre of the bridge during construction cost over 80 workers their lives.

During World War II, two Allied Forces conferences were held in the city. The first, held in 1943, assembled Franklin Delano Roosevelt, president of the United States of America; Winston Churchill, Prime Minister of the United Kingdom; William Lyon Mackenzie King, Prime Minister of Canada and T. V. Soong, Chinese Minister of Foreign Affairs. The second conference was held in 1944 and Churchill and Roosevelt participated. The conferences were held at the Citadel and nearby Château Frontenac.

== Modern Quebec City ==
In 1972, the Quebec Nordiques professional ice hockey team was founded; it moved to Denver in 1995.

In 1984, Opération Nez rouge was founded in Quebec City. It has been imitated in many European countries.

In April 2001, Quebec City played host to the Summit of the Americas where the Free Trade Area of the Americas (FTAA) was discussed. This conference was expected to be filled with confrontations between the police and anti-globalization groups, which meant that the location of walled Quebec City was vital for security reasons.

On January 1, 2002, surrounding towns were incorporated into the existing city. The "New Quebec city" includes 11 former municipalities: Sainte-Foy, Beauport, Charlesbourg, Sillery, Loretteville, Val-Bélair, Cap-Rouge, Saint-Émile, Vanier, and Lac-Saint-Charles, in addition to the original Quebec City.

In 2005, Capitale-Nationale played host to a major world sporting event, the World Police and Fire Games, which was a success for the city, with as many as 11,000 athletes and 14,000 people accompanying them, making 25,000 people in total. The city also experienced higher than average temperatures with an average of 30 degrees Celsius.

== See also ==
- History of Quebec
- List of National Historic Sites of Canada in Quebec City
- Timeline of Quebec City history
