= Quebec City Fire Protection Service =

Service de protection contre les incendies de Québec

Agency overview
- Established: 2002
- Staffing: Career
- Fire chief: Christian Paradis (as director)
- EMS level: BLS

Facilities and equipment
- Stations: 16

Website
- ville.quebec.qc.ca/incendie

Service de protection contre les incendies de Québec (SPCIQ, Quebec City Fire Protection Service) is responsible for fire prevention and suppression in Quebec City, Quebec, Canada. The fire department responds to vehicle accidents, hazardous materials (HAZMAT) calls, technical rescue (high-angle and confined space), ice and water rescue, wildfires and many other situations in which citizens are in need of external help.

== History ==
Professional fire fighting in Quebec began in 1765, but the current force was created by amalgamation of several area fire services in 2002:

- Québec: provided fire protection to Charlesbourg, Beauport and Vanier before amalgamation
- Sainte-Foy: provided fire protection to Cap-Rouge and l'Ancienne-Lorette
- Sillery
- Val-Bélair
- Loretteville
- Saint-Émile
- Lac Saint-Charles
- Saint-Augustin-de-Desmaures
- Duberger
- Neufchâtel

Despite presence of a fire service, Quebec suffered two devastating fires:

=== Quebec fires of 1845 ===
In 1845 Quebec would face two devastating fires resulting in 50 deaths, 3000 buildings lost, 22,000 residents losing their homes or business and caused extensive damage to the two-thirds of the city outside of the Fortification thus sparing Old Quebec (La Basse-Ville de Québec):

- May 28 - the first fire that began in a tannery on rue Arago and burned down wood structures in the Lower Town and Saint-Roch area
- June 28 - the second fire began in the Upper Town, in St. Jean (Saint-Jean-Baptiste) and St. Louis (Parliament Hill)

=== Great Fire of Quebec 1866 ===
A fire at a store on rue St. Joseph on 14 October 1866 resulted in 2500-3000 buildings lost, 7 deaths and 20,000 residents homeless. Wind and lack of water resulted in extensive damage (significant part of the Saint-Sauveur neighbourhood razed) but Saint Roch was spared with less fire damage.

== Ranks ==
Besides regular firefighter, SPCIQ has other ranks:

- Logistics platoon leader
- Chief of logistics operations
- Platoon leader
- Chief operating officer
- Chief of operations
- Platoon chief
- SST platoon chief
- Deputy director - operations
- Deputy director - strategic and administrative affairs
- Director

== Operations ==
There are 16 stations (numbered 1-17 with the exception of 14:

| Station | Area | Address | Build year | Notes |
|---|---|---|---|---|
| 1 | St.- Jean | 140, rue Saint-Jean | 1972 | Built as Station 12 and renumbered in 1983. It is the departments Headquarters and home to the only tiller aerial units in Canada. |
| 2 | Des Capucins | 470, boulevard des Capucins | 2008 | Home to the high-angle and confined space (technical rescue) units. Originally Station 3 until 1983. |
| 3 | Saint-Sauveur | 600, avenue des Oblats | 1893 | Additions added 1912 and restored 1990. Home to a water and ice rescue unit and originally Station 8 until 1983. It is one of Canada's oldest stations. |
| 4 | Saint-Odile | 70, rue des Pins Ouest | 1968 | Built to replace Station 11, renumbered as Station 7 in 1983 and again in 1992 as Station 4. |
| 5 | Duberger | 2345, rue de la Rivière-du-Berger | 1967 | Formerly built for Ville de Duberger Fire Service then merged with Quebec in 1971 as Station 2 and renumbered as Station 5 in 1983. Home to HAZMAT decon unit. |
| 6 | L'Ormière | 8005, rue des Soulois | 2019 | Formerly built for Ville de Neufchâtel Fire Service then merged with Quebec in 1971 as Station 4 and renumbered as Station 6 in 1983. It was rebuilt in 2019. |
| 7 | Beauport-Sud | 255, rue Clemenceau | 1978 | Formerly built for Ville de Beauport as fire station and court house, renovated 1989 and renumbered as Station 7 in 1993. |
| 8 | Charlesbourg | 4252, place Orsainville | 1976 | Formerly built for Ville de Charlesbourg and became station 8 in 1994. Home to an off-road rescue and brush fire unit. |
| 9 | Sainte Foy | 1130, route de l'Église | 1994 | Became Station 9 in 2002 and previously built for Ville de Sainte Foy. |
| 10 | Champigny | 1808, avenue Jules-Verne | 2023 | Formerly built for Ville de Sainte Foy and numbered as Station 10 in 2002. Rebuilt in 2023. |
| 11 | Saint-Augustin-de-Desmaures | 183, route 138 Ville de Saint-Augustin-de-Desmaures | 2011 | |
| 12 | Val-Bélair | 2056, avenue Industrielle | 2009 | Home to an off-road rescue and brush fire unit. Formerly built to replace old Ville de Val-Bélair fire station after amalgamation in 2002. |
| 13 | Lebourgneuf | 770, rue des Rocailles | 2008 | Home to the HAZMAT rescue units as well as Club Appel 99. |
| 15 | Sillery | 1445, avenue Maguire | 1965 | Formerly built for Ville de Sillery to house fire station, town hall and police station and became Station 15 in 2002. Renovated in 2004. |
| 16 | Saint-Émile | 2528, avenue Lapierre | 2016 | Replaced old Ville de Saint-Émile station/municipal garage built 1980, became Station 13 in 2002 and renumbered as Station 16 in 2005. Home to a water and ice rescue unit. |
| 17 | Beauport-Nord | 2681, boulevard Louis-XIV | 2008 | Home to a water and ice rescue unit. |

== Water and ice rescue ==
Quebec City uses small vessels with outboard motor mainly for water rescue operations. Known vessels include:

- Airsolid 16' inflatable rescue boat
- NAV 16 inflatable rescue boat

Rapid Deployment Craft are unpowered inflatable vessel used for ice rescue operations.

Major fire suppression can be assisted by Canadian Coast Guard vessels stationed nearby along the St. Lawrence River. Water and ice rescue is further assisted by the Maritime Rescue Sub-Centre Quebec.

== See also ==
- Service de police de la Ville de Québec
