= Nelson River (Saint-Charles River tributary) =

Nelson river
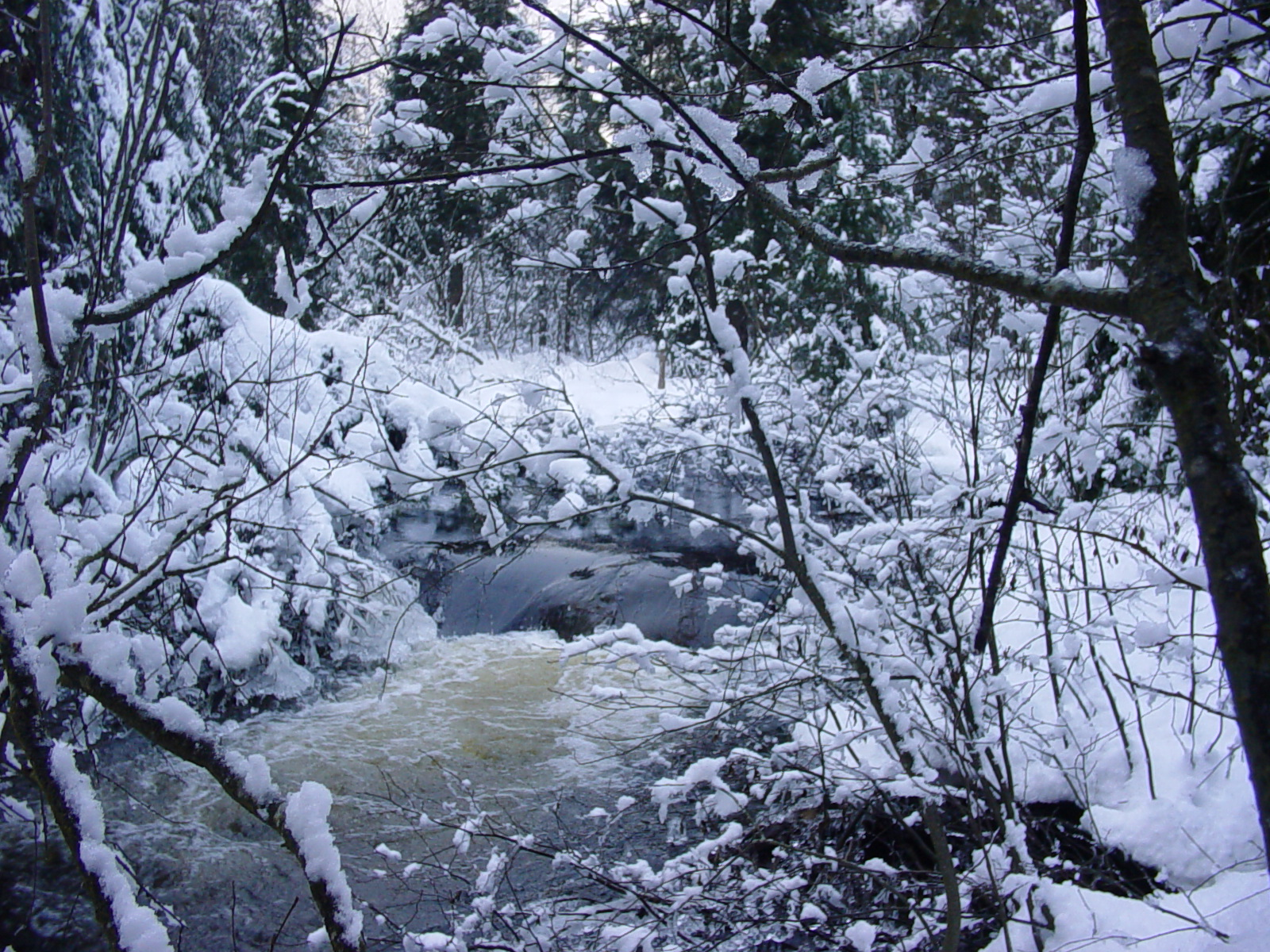
- Image of the course of the river.

- Location of the mouth of the river in Quebec City
- Native name: Rivière Nelson (French)

Location
- Country: Canada
- Province: Quebec
- Region: Capitale-Nationale
- Cities: Quebec City

Physical characteristics
- Source: Agricultural stream
  - location: Canadian Force Base of Valcartier
  - coordinates: 46.96274°N 71.44785°W
  - elevation: 202
- Mouth: Saint-Charles River
  - location: Quebec (city) (sector Les Saules)
  - coordinates: 46.868456°N 71.374328°W
  - elevation: 150 m
- Length: 26.9 km (16.7 mi)
- Basin size: 70 km^{2} (27 sq mi)

Basin features
- River system: Saint Lawrence River
- Tributaries
  - left: (Upward from the mouth) discharge from two unidentified lakes, unidentified stream, unidentified stream, La Petite Rivière, Lac Blanc outlet, unidentified stream.
  - right: (Upward from the mouth) Savard stream, unidentified stream, unidentified stream, Dextraze stream, discharge from an unidentified small lake, discharge from an unidentified small lake, discharge from 3 unidentified small lakes.

The Nelson River is located in the administrative region of Capitale-Nationale, in province of Quebec, in Canada. It is part of the watershed of the Saint-Charles River. The course of this river crosses:

- the La Jacques-Cartier Regional County Municipality: the municipality of Saint-Gabriel-de-Valcartier;
- the Quebec city: sector La Haute-Saint-Charles and Neufchâtel-Nord area.

The Nelson River Valley is mainly served by Nelson River Street, Valcartier Boulevard, Rue du Petit Vallon, Route de la Bravoure and Route Cathcart.

The surface of the Saint-Charles River (except the rapids areas) is generally frozen from the beginning of December to the end of March; however, safe circulation on the ice is generally done from the end of December to the beginning of March. The water level of the river varies with the seasons and the precipitation; the spring flood occurs in March or April.

== Geography ==
The Nelson River sub-basin occupies the western part of the watershed of the Saint-Charles River and straddles part of the Quebec city and the municipality of Saint-Gabriel-de-Valcartier. Formerly also called by its residents "Grand-Désert river", it rises near the Canadian Forces Base of Valcartier (a garrison of the Canadian Armed Forces), runs through the Val-Bélair district then flows into the Saint-Charles River a little upstream of the drinking water supply point of the Quebec city, at the level of rue Jeanne-D'Arc on the territory of 7th arrondissement. It is 30 kilometres (19 mi) long and its watershed covers 70 square kilometers.

The watershed is characterized by an average altitude that varies little from upstream to downstream. The relief is however punctuated by a few mountains at the higher altitude (Mount of the Three Augustines, Mount Brillant and Mount Rolland-J.-Auger) on which certain recreational activities are sometimes practiced, notably in the territory of the Canadian Forces Base of Valcartier where a ski center has been set up.

The land use in the Nelson River sub-basin is predominantly forest. However, two sectors are marked by agricultural activities, mainly poultry farming and cereal farming. With many meanders in wooded then semi-urban territory, we meet a diverse fauna despite the pollution inherent in the territories it crosses in its last kilometers (trout, mallards), amphibians, etc.).

From Lac de la Savane, the course of the Nelson river descends on 26.9 kilometres (16.7 mi), with a drop of 52 metres (171 ft), according to the following segments:

- 2.2 kilometres (1.4 mi) to the south, first forming a large curve to the west and crossing a small unidentified lake to its mouth. Note: This lake hosts the outlet of a stream (coming from the northwest);
- 2.8 kilometres (1.7 mi) south-east, to the outlet (coming from the north) of Lac Blanc;
- 1.6 kilometres (0.99 mi) south-east, to the confluence of La Petite Rivière;
- 7.9 kilometres (4.9 mi) first towards the southwest by crossing route 371 (boulevard Valcartier), crossing the area of Golf Le Castor, then bypassing Mont Brillant whose summit reaches 444 metres (1,457 ft), by crossing on the western part of the sector La Haute-Saint-Charles of Quebec city, before returning to cross Saint-Gabriel-de-Valcartier on , and southeasterly to route 573 (route de la Bravoure) in the Courcelette district. Note: This end of segment corresponds to the limit between Saint-Gabriel-de-Valcartier and La Haute-Saint-Charles;
- 5.4 kilometres (3.4 mi) to the east, meandering through the Val-Saint-Michel district, and collecting the Savard stream (coming from the west), to route 573;
- 6.8 kilometres (4.2 mi) towards the east, then the northeast by snaking to its mouth.

The confluence of the Nelson river and the Saint-Charles River is located in the Château-d'Eau sector of the city of Quebec at 13.3 kilometres (8.3 mi) east of the mouth of the Saint-Charles river, 5.4 kilometres (3.4 mi) east of central Charlesbourg-Ouest and 4.5 kilometres (2.8 mi) south of the hamlet Lac-Saint-Charles.

From this confluence, the current descends on 25.6 kilometres (15.9 mi) generally towards the south-east, then towards the north-east, following the course of the Saint-Charles river.

== Toponymy ==
A street in Quebec is called "rue de la Rivière-Nelson" in arrondissement of La Haute-Saint-Charles.

The term "Nelson" evokes the life work of Neilson McBain (Quebec, 1898 - Quebec, 1985), mayor of Saint-Gabriel-de-Valcartier in 1949 and owner of land crossed by the Nelson river. The writing of the name of the river differs slightly from that of the character from which it takes its name. This river was once called Mill River. This name appears on the act of acquisition of the property in 1925. In 1963, the river was already known by its current name.

The toponym "Nelson River" was formalized on March 28, 1974 at the Commission de toponymie du Québec.

== Sources ==
- Vescovi, L. (1998) Modern thinking on urban water management: hydro-bio-chemical modeling of the Saint-Charles river basin. Quebec: INRS-Eau (Doctoral thesis); extract consulted via Rivière vivante, June 15, 2006.
- Brodeur, C., F. Lewis, E. Huet-Alegre, Y. Ksouri, M.-C. Leclerc and D. Viens. 2007. Portrait of the Saint-Charles river basin. Saint-Charles river basin council. 216 p + 9 annexes 217-340 pp

== See also ==
- La Jacques-Cartier Regional County Municipality
- Quebec (city), a city
- Saint-Gabriel-de-Valcartier, a municipality
- La Haute-Saint-Charles, a sector of Quebec city
- CFB Valcartier, Canadian Forces Base Valcartier
- La Petite Rivière, a tributary
- Saint-Charles River
- St. Lawrence River
- List of rivers of Quebec
