= Quebec City Police Service =

Municipal police force of Quebec City

City of Quebec Police Service Service de police de la Ville de Quebec
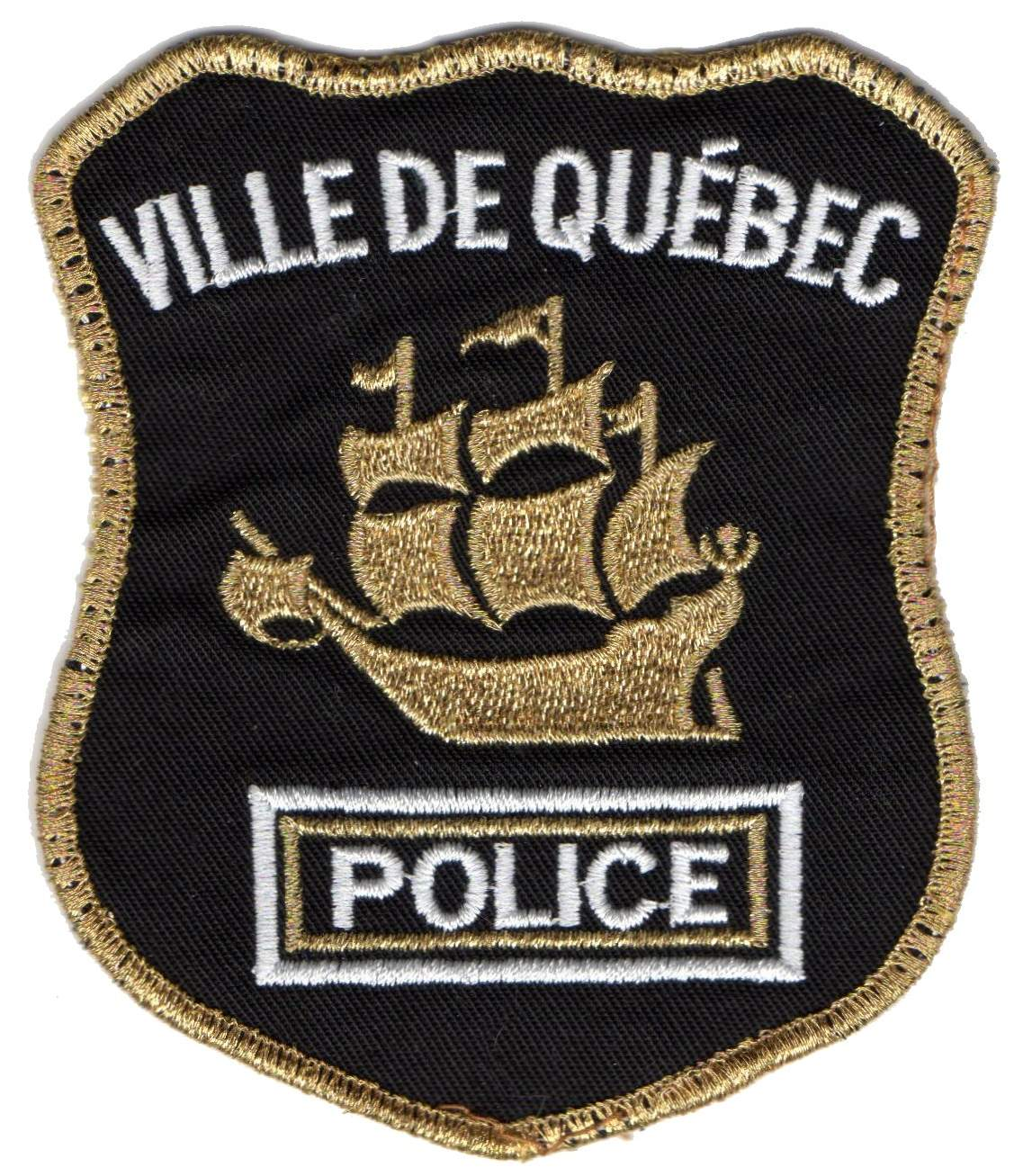
- Patch of the SPVQ, worn on officers’ uniforms
- Abbreviation: SPVQ

Agency overview
- Formed: May 2, 1843 (historic); 2002 (Current SPVQ)
- Annual budget: $121,417,617 (2018)

Jurisdictional structure
- Operations jurisdiction: Urban agglomeration of Quebec City, CAN
- Area: 485.77 km^{2} (187.56 sq mi)
- Population: 531,902

Operational structure
- Headquarters: 495 Boulevard Louis-XIV, Quebec City
- Sworn members: 800
- Unsworn members: 200
- Elected officer responsible: Ian Lafrenière, Ministre de la Sécurité intérieure
- Agency executive: Robert Pigeon, Chief of Police (Director)

Facilities
- Police Posts: 4

Website
- ville.quebec.qc.ca/citoyens/police/

The Quebec City Police Service (French: Service de police de la Ville de Quebec, SPVQ) is the municipal police force of Quebec City, Quebec, Canada, and the neighbouring municipalities in the urban agglomeration of Quebec City.

== History ==
Quebec has had some level of policing since 1651, but a modern force was not established until 1843 under the leadership of Robert Henry Russell.

The current force was created from the merger of five separate police forces into the existing Quebec City police force in 2002.

== Operations ==
SPVQ operations consists of four stations covering 6 Boroughs:

Station Address	Borough Served	Notes
275 Rue de la Maréchaussée	1st Borough La Cité-Limoilou	Existing Capital area before 2002.
2780 rue de la Faune	2nd Borough Les Rivières; 6th Borough La Haute-Saint-Charles	Previously served by police departments in Vanier (rest of Les Rivières was covered by SPVQ before 2002), Val-Bélair and Haute-Saint-Charles
1130 route de l'Eglise	3rd Borough Sainte-Foy–Sillery–Cap-Rouge	Previous served by police departments for Sainte-Foy, Sillery
4252 rue d'Orsainville	4th Borough Charlesbourg; 5th Borough Beauport	Previous served by police departments for Charlesbourg

There are plans to reduce the number of stations to two:

- consolidate stations serving La Cité-Limoilou, Les Rivières, Charlesbourg, Beauport and La Haute-Saint-Charles into one station out from Lebourgneuf with a smaller sub station l'édifice F.-X. Drolet de Saint-Roch serving the city centre.
- Sainte-Foy–Sillery–Cap-Rouge would maintain a dedicate station.

== List of directors and chiefs of police ==
- 1843 - 1858 : Robert Henry Russell
- 1858 - 1866 : Jean-Baptiste Bureau
- 1880 - 1895 : Léon P. Vohl
- 1903 - 1936 : Émile Trudel
- 1938 - 1942 : Adolphe-Stephen Thomas dit Bigaouette (1887-1942)
- 1950 - 1965 : Roger Lemire
- 1965 : Aimé Guillemette
- 1965 - 1968 : Gérard Girard
- 1968 - 1972 : Joseph-Alphonse Matte
- 1973 - 1980 : Jean-Charles Vanhoutte
- 1980 - 1985 : Robert Vézina
- 1985 - 1996 : Normand Bergeron
- 1997 - 2001 : Alexandre Matte
- 2001 - 2006 : Daniel Langlais
- 2007 - 2011 : Serge Bélisle
- 2011 - 2016 : Michel Desgagné
- 2016 - 2021 : Robert Pigeon
- 2021 - : Denis Turcotte

== See also ==
- Service de protection contre les incendies de Québec
