= Quebec County, Quebec =

Coordinates: 46.86°N 71.26°W

Quebec County was a historic county in the province of Quebec, Canada. The county included the Quebec City metropolitan area and extended northwestward. The county seat was Loretteville.

Quebec County was used as an electoral district in the first election held for members of the Legislative Assembly of Lower Canada in 1792.

== Creation (1855) ==
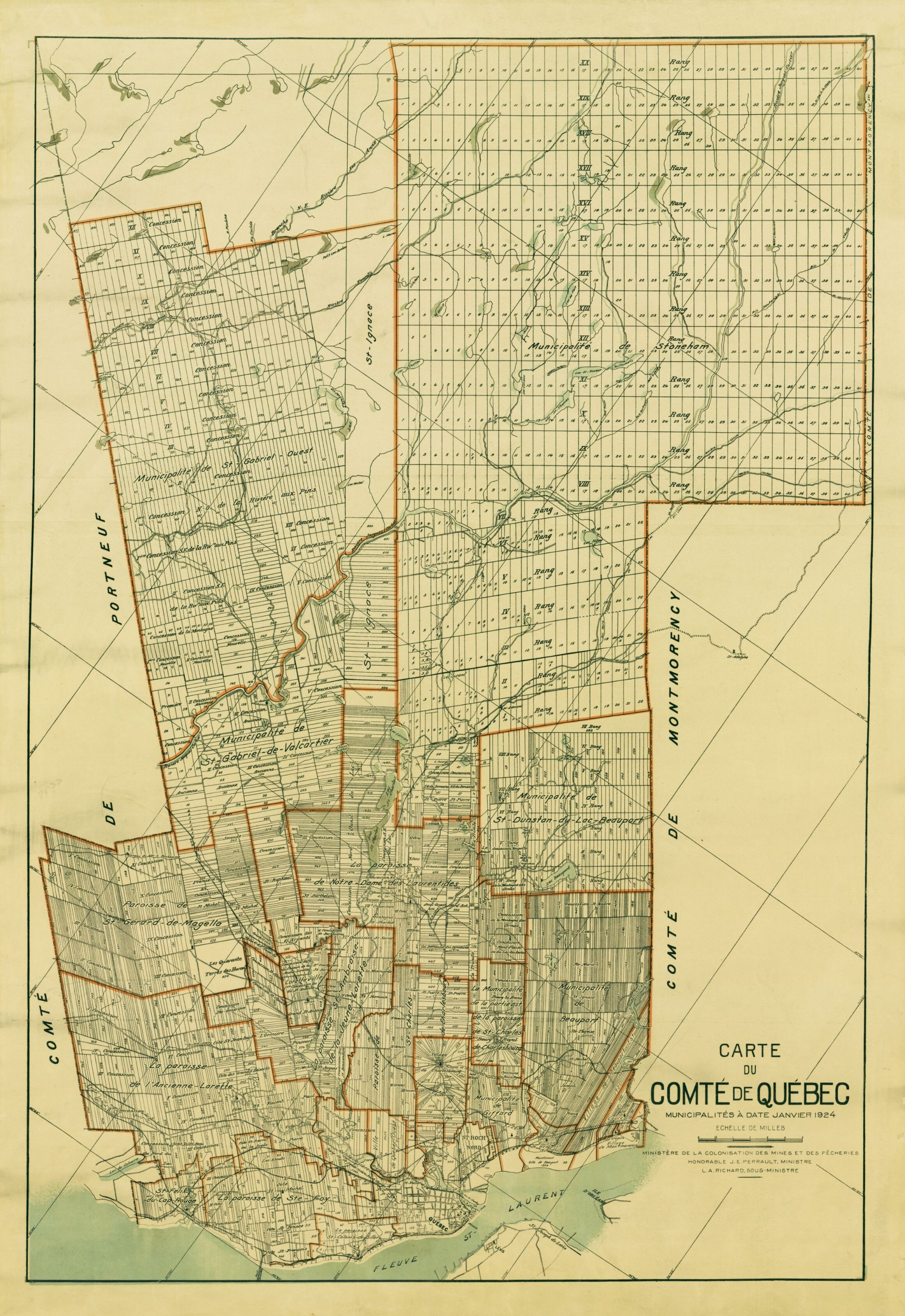
Map of the municipalities of the County of Quebec, as they existed in January 1924.

The county was established on July 1, 1855, encompassing all municipalities and unorganized territory within the following limits:

- to the south: the Saint Lawrence River
- to the north: the 48th parallel
- to the west: the western limits of the parishes of Sainte-Foy, l'Ancienne-Lorette and Saint-Ambroise, and of the Seigniory of Saint-Gabriel and the prolongation thereof to the northern limit of the County
- to the east: the southwestern line of the Seigniory of La Côte de Beaupré until it meets the southeastern line of the Township of Tewkesbury, then northeast to its eastern corner, then by its northeastern line to the rear thereof, and then by the prolongation of that line to the northern limit of the county
- excepting the City of Quebec and the parishes of Notre-Dame-de-Quebec and Saint-Roch-de-Québec.

In 1896, in addition to the unorganized territory, the County comprised the following entities:

- the parishes of Beauport, Charlesbourg, L'Ancienne-Lorette, Saint-Ambroise-de-la-Jeune-Lorette, Saint-Colomb-de-Sillery, Saint-Félix-du-Cap-Rouge and Sainte-Foy
- the municipalities of Limoilou, Saint-Dunstan-du-lac-Beauport, Saint-Gabriel-de-Valcartier, Saint-Gabriel-Ouest and St-Malo
- in the banlieue of the City of Quebec: the parishes of Quebec, (Note: being that part of the parish of Notre-Dame-de-Québec lying outside the limits of the City of Quebec) Notre-Dame-des-Anges, Sacré-Cœur-de-Jésus, Saint-Roch-Nord and Saint-Sauveur-de-Québec
- the united townships of Stoneham-et-Tewkesbury
- the fief Hubert (Note: a seigniory lying north of Saint-Gabriel, measuring two leagues square, created in 1698 but never settled or developed prior to the abolition of seigneurial tenure, and now forming part of the ZEC Batiscan-Neilson)

In 1864, Saint-Colomb-de-Sillery was granted the powers of a county council for certain limited purposes.

== Municipalities ==
The county included the following municipalities/townships:

- Beauport-Ouest
- Charlesbourg-Est
- Charlesbourg-Ouest
- Lac-Édouard
- Lac-Saint-Charles
- L'Ancienne-Lorette
- Notre-Dame-des-Laurentides
- Orsainville
- Saint-Ambroise-de-la-Jeune-Lorette
- Saint-Dunstan-du-Lac-Beauport
- Saint-Félix-du-Cap-Rouge
- Saint-Gabriel-de-Valcartier
- Saint-Gabriel-Ouest
- Saint-Gérard-Magella
- Sainte-Monique-des-Saules
- Sainte-Thérèse-de-Lisieux
- Stoneham-et-Tewkesbury

== Municipal reorganization (1970-1981) ==
The municipalities constituting the suburban area surrounding Quebec City were withdrawn from the County at the beginning of 1970 to form the Communauté urbaine de Québec.

When Quebec's county boundaries were redrawn into Regional County Municipalities the county was dissolved mostly into La Jacques-Cartier, with small parts going to Le Haut-Saint-Maurice and Portneuf.

== See also ==
- Provincial and territorial capitals of Canada
