= Lac-Saint-Charles =

Lac-Saint-Charles may refer to:

- Lac-Saint-Charles, Quebec City, a former city now part of Quebec City
- Le lac Saint-Charles, a lake close by Lac-Saint-Charles, Quebec City
- Lac-Saint-Charles–Saint-Émile, a district of Quebec City
