= La Petite Rivière (Nelson River tributary) =

- Location of the mouth of the river in Quebec City

Location
- Country: Canada
- Province: Quebec
- Region: Capitale-Nationale
- Cities: Quebec City and MRC La Jacques-Cartier Regional County Municipality
- Municipalities: Lac-Saint-Charles and Saint-Gabriel-de-Valcartier

Physical characteristics
- Source: Rifey Lake
  - location: Quebec (city)
  - coordinates: 46.910531°N 71.432786°W
  - elevation: 196
- Mouth: Nelson River
  - location: Saint-Gabriel-de-Valcartier (sector Les Saules)
  - coordinates: 46.92389°N 71.44083°W
  - elevation: 193 m
- Length: 1.9 km (1.2 mi)

Basin features
- River system: Saint Lawrence River
- Tributaries
  - right: (Upward from the mouth) Discharge of three small lakes, an unidentified stream.

La Petite Rivière (French pronunciation: [la pətit ʁivjɛʁ], lit. 'The Little River') is a tributary stream of the Nelson River, flowing in the administrative region of Capitale-Nationale, in the province from Quebec, to Canada. The course of the river crosses:

- Quebec City over only a hundred metres;
- the municipality of Lac-Saint-Charles over only a hundred metres;
- the municipality of Saint-Gabriel-de-Valcartier in the La Jacques-Cartier Regional County Municipality.

This watercourse is part of the watershed of the Saint-Charles River.

The valley of "La Petite Rivière" is mainly served by boulevard Valcartier and rue Morley.

The surface of "La Petite Rivière" (except the rapids areas) is generally frozen from the beginning of December to the end of March; however, safe circulation on the ice is generally done from the end of December to the beginning of March. The water level of the river varies with the seasons and the precipitation; the spring flood occurs in March or April.

== Geography ==
Land use in the La Petite Rivière sub-basin is mainly forested on the northeast side and agricultural in the southwest side. Located on the north side of boulevard Valcartier, Lac Rifey is the head lake of this small river. It is located between Mont Brillant (south side) and Mont Snow (North side). A quarrying zone that runs along boulevard Valcartier is located on the west side of this head lake.

From Lac Rifey, the course of La Petite Rivière descends on 1.9 kilometres (1.2 mi), with a drop of 6 metres (20 ft), according to the following segments:

- 1.8 kilometres (1.1 mi) towards the north-west following the foot of the cliff of Mont Snow (summit altitude: 344 metres (1,129 ft)), up to the discharge (coming from the North-East) of three small unidentified lakes;
- 0.1 kilometres (0.062 mi) south-west, to its mouth.

The confluence of La Petite Rivière and the Nelson River is located in Saint-Gabriel-de-Valcartier at 7.9 kilometres (4.9 mi) to the north-west of the mouth of the Nelson River; 20.6 kilometres (12.8 mi) west of the mouth of the Saint-Charles river; 5.3 kilometres (3.3 mi) east of the village center of Lac-Saint-Charles and 2.7 kilometres (1.7 mi) east of the village center of Saint-Gabriel-de-Valcartier.

From the mouth of La Petite Rivière, the current descends on 20.1 kilometres (12.5 mi) following the course of the Nelson river; then on 25.6 kilometres (15.9 mi) generally towards the south-east, then towards the north-east, following the course of the Saint-Charles river.

== Naming ==
The name "La Petite Rivière" was formalized on January 7, 1985 at the Commission de toponymie du Québec. It is a toponym for the nearby features.

== Sources ==
Among the sources used for this article are:

- Vescovi, L. (1998) Modern thinking on urban water management: hydro-bio-chemical modeling of the Saint-Charles river basin. Quebec: INRS-Eau (Doctoral thesis); extract consulted via Rivière vivante, June 15, 2006.
- Brodeur, C., F. Lewis, E. Huet-Alegre, Y. Ksouri, M.-C. Leclerc and D. Viens. 2007. Portrait of the Saint-Charles river basin. Saint-Charles river basin council. 216 p + 9 annexes 217-340 pp.

== See also ==
- La Jacques-Cartier, a MRC
- Quebec (city), a city
- Lac-Saint-Charles, a municipality
- Saint-Gabriel-de-Valcartier, a municipality
- La Haute-Saint-Charles, an area of Quebec City
- Saint-Charles River
- St. Lawrence River
- List of rivers of Quebec
