= Limoilou dust controversy =

Air pollution controversy in Quebec City, Canada

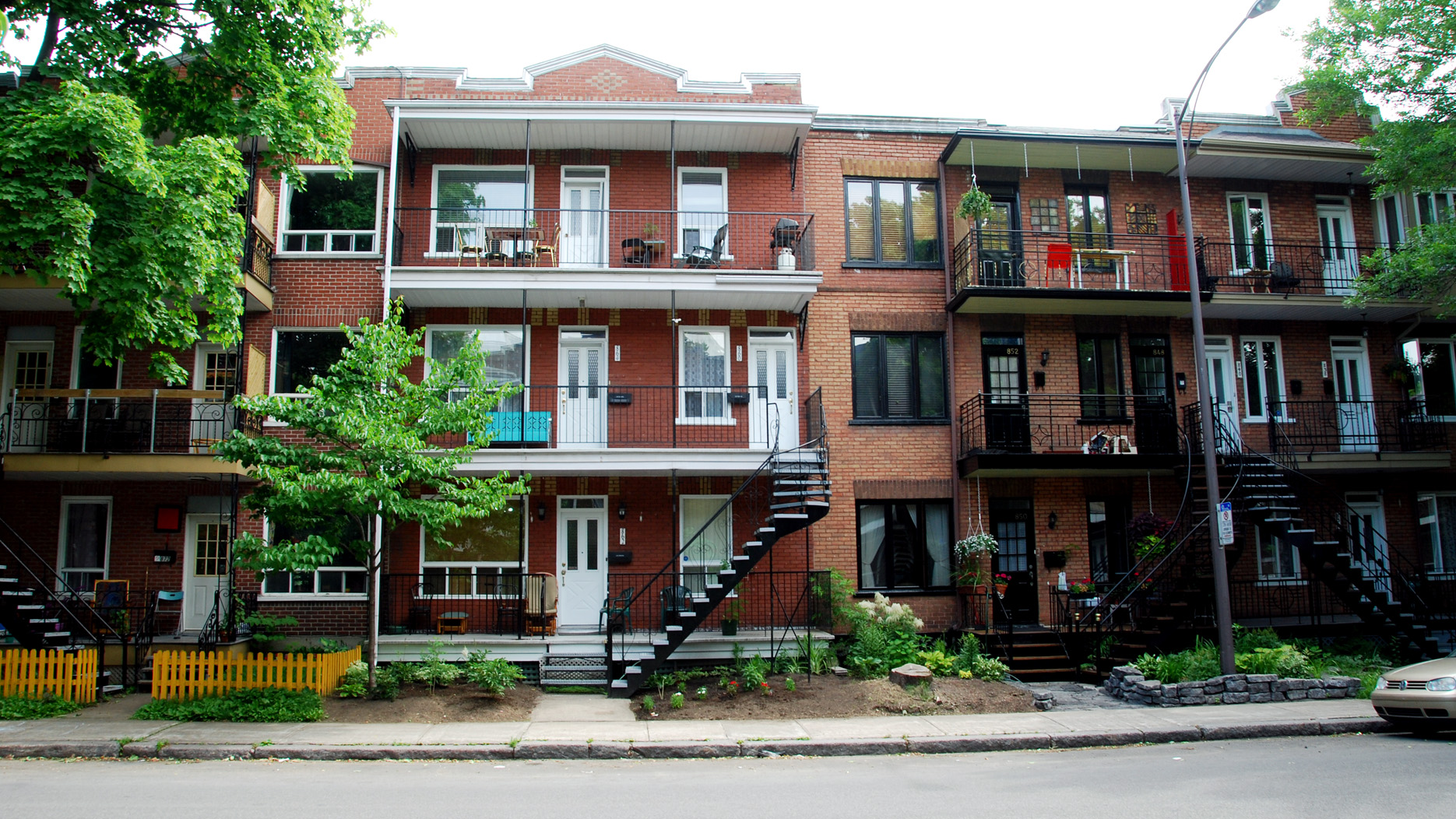
Apartment block in Quebec City's Limoilou neighborhood, where the dust controversy was centered.

The Limoilou dust controversy involves the Port of Quebec, St. Lawrence Stevedoring Ltd. and the residents of Quebec City, who claimed that the quality of their environment and their health had been degraded by dust emanating from ore transshipment at the nearby port. The controversy was triggered in October 2012 by the observation of red dust covering sections of the Vieux-Limoilou neighborhood. After documenting other similar incidents, residents filed two class-action suits against the Port of Quebec and St. Lawrence Stevedoring. In March 2018, St. Lawrence Stevedoring recognized its responsibility for the incidents, and agreed to compensate residents who could prove damages.

== Chronology ==
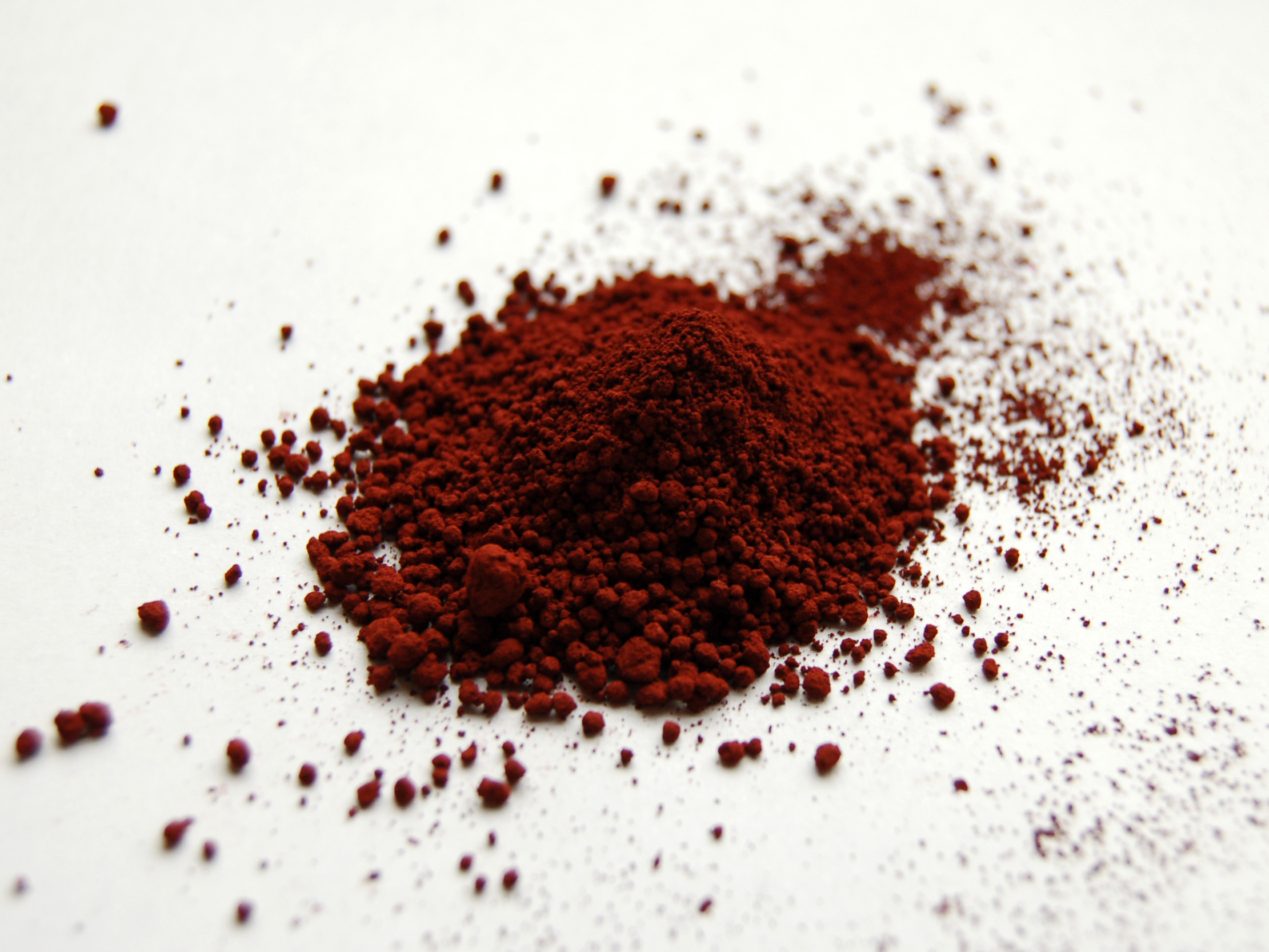
Iron oxide, original composition of the red dust which fell in Limoilou.

The controversy was triggered by a "storm of red dust" in October 2012, which left deposits of an uncertain nature on sidewalks, balconies and cars in the Limoilou and Saint-Sacrament neighborhoods. Urgence-Environnement, an intervention team from the provincial government's environmental ministry (then known by its French acronym MDDEFP), was immediately summoned to the area by residents. Several days later, St. Lawrence Stevedoring, which rented space at the Port of Quebec for transshipment of goods, confirmed that the red dust was composed of iron oxide from an iron ore transfer in the Beauport Bay area. The company also claimed that the dust storm was an isolated incident.

On October 26, 2012, Limoilou residents collected dust samples to be analyzed in a private laboratory. Results showed that the dust contained high levels of iron, as well as other heavy metals including copper, nickel and zinc. With these findings in hand, residents directly confronted the mayor of Quebec City during a city council meeting. Additionally, the environmental ministry's findings led to the filing of a notice of non-conformity with St. Lawrence Stevedoring.

In the following days, other residents contacted media outlets to share their observations about dust clouds around the Port of Quebec, saying that such incidents had taken place in the area on other occasions. Residents of the Cap-Blanc neighborhood had also been affected by the dust, adding that their frequency had been increasing over the previous few years. Furthermore, during summer 2012, residents of Levis, on the south shore of the St. Lawrence River across from Quebec City, also observed clouds of red dust coming from the port on several occasions; deposits of dust had been noticed there as well. In the wake of the reports, media sources also revealed that the MDDEFP had been surveying the Port of Quebec's activities since 2003 due to its dust emissions.

In November 2012, residents collected new dust samples in the Limoilou and Saint-Jean-Baptiste neighborhoods for analysis. Once again, the results showed elevated concentrations of heavy metals occasionally exceeding provincial and federal environmental standards; residents claimed that it was proof that metallic dust from the Port of Quebec was regularly emitted into the air of the surrounding neighborhoods.

Shortly afterwards, St. Lawrence Stevedoring claimed that while the dust may have inconvenienced residents, it did not represent a health risk. These conclusions stemmed from analysis of the samples obtained by the MDDEFP, the results of which contrasted with those obtained by the residents.

In December 2012, a web site compiling residents' observations regarding the Port of Quebec was created.

In January 2013, in its annual report, the Port of Quebec recognized that the dust episode on October 26 was unfortunate and to be avoided in the future, while also emphasizing its isolated nature. In response, the MDDEFP issued a press release soliciting the port's assistance with its investigation. However, the Quebec Port Authority was hesitant to cooperate and did little to assist, instead challenging the applicability of provincial law in court.

=== A class-action suit is filed ===
On January 14, 2013, a request for authorization to submit a class-action suit was submitted by a Limoilou resident, looking to compensate residents affected by the October 26, 2012 dust episode and to require the Port of Quebec to modify its facility to prevent all dust emissions beyond its property.

In March 2013, another suit was submitted by Limoilou residents towards the Port of Quebec after another dust episode.

=== The environmental ministry corroborates residents' findings ===
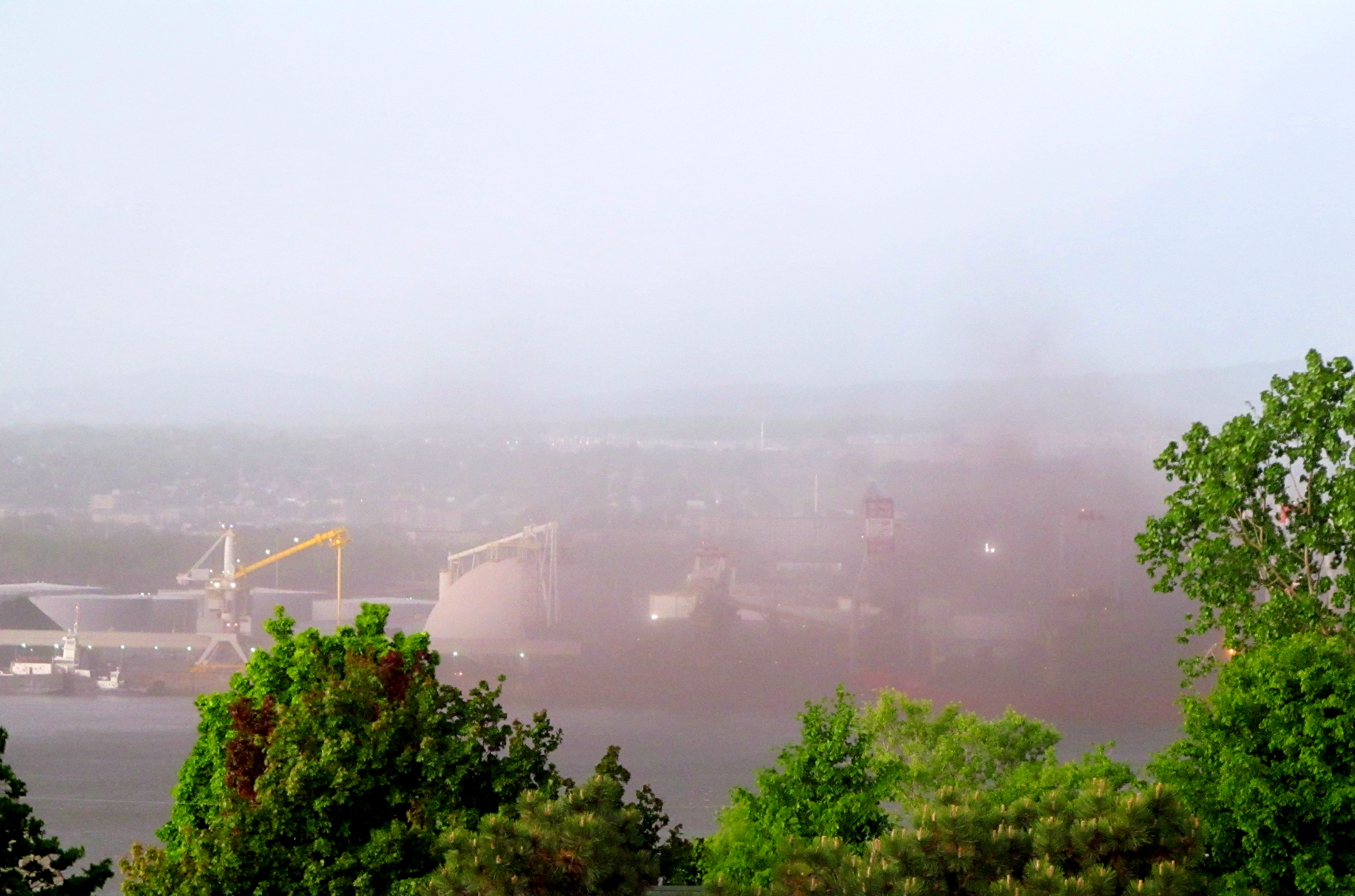
Dust cloud around transshipment operations at the Port of Quebec, observed May 31, 2013.

In April 2013, the provincial environmental ministry (MDDEP) released test results of the concentration of various metals in the air in Limoilou, taken between 2000 and 2012. The results showed that in the majority of those years, the average nickel concentration exceeded environmental standards. From 2010 to 2012, the average concentration was 5.7 times above normal limits. The ministry concluded that the Port of Quebec was the source of the nickel, and issued a notice of non-compliance to St. Lawrence Stevedoring, which carried out nickel transshipment on Port property. St. Lawrence Stevedoring, while still calling into question its responsibility for air pollution in Limoilou, nevertheless presented an action plan to reduce its dust emissions.

On June 16, 2013, another dust episode took place in Limoilou. St. Lawrence Stevedoring indicated that the water cannons used to capture dust from transshipments were not in operation at the time. On June 25, residents took note of additional dust coming from the Port, and a complaint was filed. An inspector from Urgence-Environnement arrived on the scene, but could not gain access to the site. The MDDEP subsequently sent a formal notice to St. Lawrence Stevedoring

In August 2013, a new report was posted online by Limoilou residents, featuring further analysis of dust and air samples which showed that dust collected on outside surfaces in Limoilou continued to contain nickel concentrations exceeding public health standards. The report also presented analysis of air samples collected by the MDDEP at various locations in Quebec City, demonstrating that nickel was present in significant concentrations at locations more than five kilometers from the port.

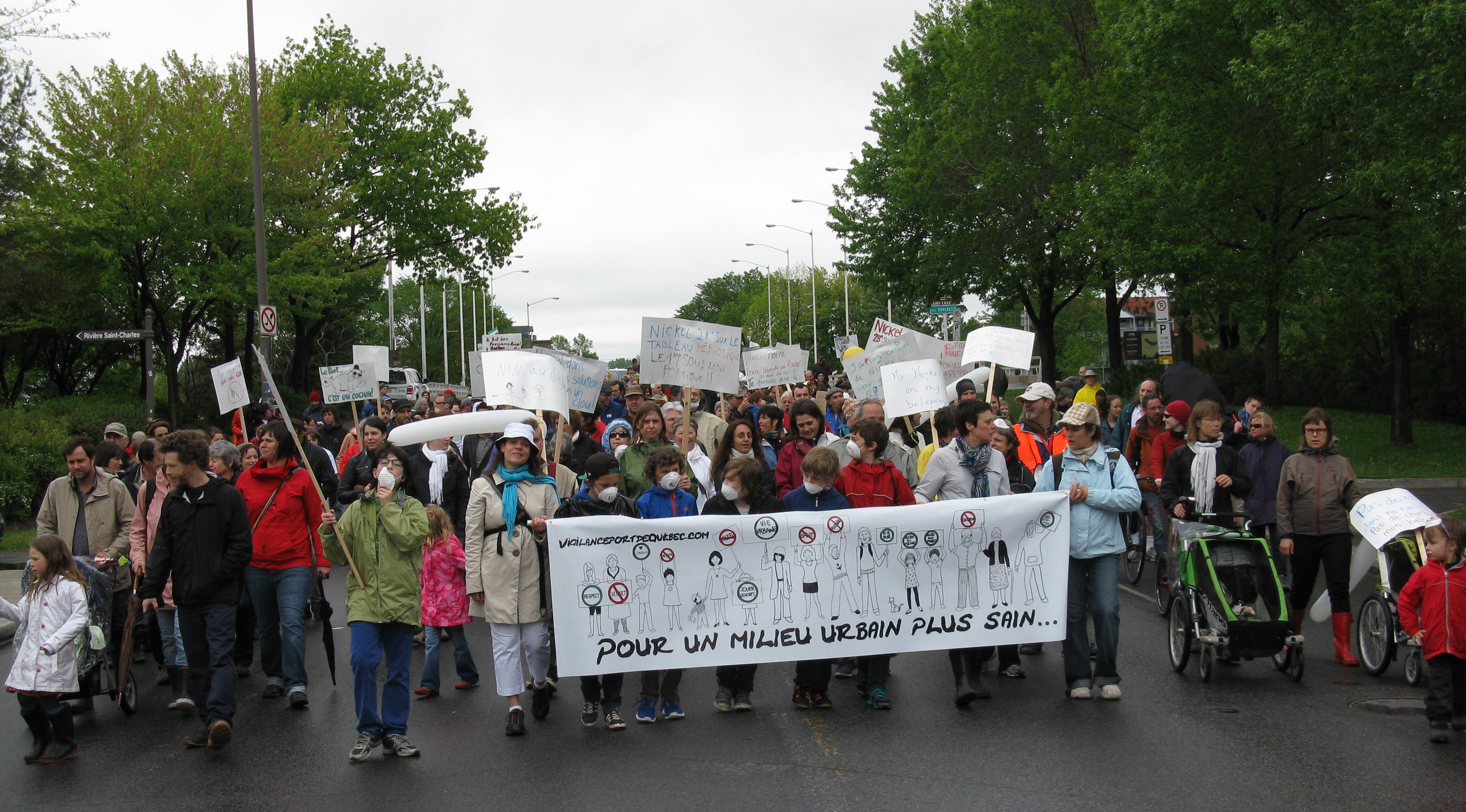
2013 citizen demonstration for the right to live in a healthy environment.

In light of the report's results, a request was made in court for the class-action suit filed in 2013 to be enlarged. Initially, the suit only concerned the October 26, 2012 dust episode, but the amendment included all subsequent episodes. The court rejected the request.

In December 2013, following the publication of a study on nickel dust's effects on human health, the MDDEP tightened the province's limits for atmospheric concentration of the metal. However, as with all ports in Canada, the Port of Quebec is located on federal land. In the wake of the events, St. Lawrence Stevedoring filed an application to the Superior Court to exclude itself from Quebec's environmental standards.

=== More red dust ===
In January 2014, Limoilou residents witnessed more episodes of red dust. Following these allegations, the MDDEP carried out more sampling in Limoilou, the Port of Quebec launched an internal investigation and St. Lawrence Stevedoring distanced itself from all responsibility. Shortly afterwards, following data verification via sensors on its property, the Port of Quebec admitted to having detected higher concentrations of fine particles than usual a few days before the Limoilou residents' report, but still slightly below provincial limits.

On May 1, 2014, the Le Soleil newspaper published MDDEP data regarding the atmospheric concentration of nickel in Limoilou and in the adjoining Vanier neighborhood. The data showed that between March 2011 and December 2013, levels were below provincial limits in Vanier, but consistently above the limits in Limoilou, despite a downward trend since fall 2011.

=== Class-action suit accepted ===
Also in May 2014, the Quebec Superior Court heard the request for a class-action suit filed by Limoilou residents against the Port of Quebec and St. Lawrence Stevedoring. The suit requested $150 million, in the form of 5,000 claims of $3,000 each. The request was accepted October 23, 2014.

In January 2015, Limoilou residents obtained copies of reports, published in the 1980s, regarding the environmental repercussions of an eventual extension of the Port of Quebec. A 1981 report mentioned that "the open-air handling of bulk solids on the Beauport flats is a source of air and water pollution." In the same report, the "dustiness" of the Limoilou neighborhood due to port activity had already been identified as problematic. A 1983 report added that air sampling stations on the port grounds had demonstrated suspended particle concentration levels above legal limits. For Limoilou residents working to stop the port's pollution of their neighborhood, the documents demonstrated that the dust issues were neither new nor rare, and that port administration had been aware of the situation.

On January 17, 2015, media outlets reported that St. Lawrence Stevedoring and the Port of Quebec had received citations for obstructing the work of MDDEP inspectors.

Also in January 2015, the MDDEP published information showing that levels of atmospheric concentration of nickel in Limoilou were above provincial limits on average one day per week between January and November 2014.

=== A second class-action suit against St. Lawrence Stevedoring ===
In August 2015, the Court authorized a second class-action suit against St. Lawrence Stevedoring. This suit was much larger than the first, covering damages caused by all dust incidents in Limoilou since 2010.

On September 8, 2016, the Quebec Superior Court gave its decision concerning the applicability of provincial standards on Port of Quebec land, saying that only federal standards applied.

In September 2017, an expert report commissioned by the Port of Quebec and Quebec Stevedoring criticized elements of the class action suit brought forth by Véronique Lalande and Louis Duchesne, questioning the methods by which the dust samples were collected. The report concluded that the ore transshipment at the port was only a marginal source of pollution in the central neighborhoods of Quebec City.

== Limoilou Nickel Contamination Incident ==
In 2023, Vieux-Limoilou, a neighbourhood in Quebec City, came under scrutiny due to persistently high levels of airborne nickel, even after authorities had previously reported improved air quality in the region. This incident highlighted a discrepancy between official statements and actual conditions, leading to significant public outcry and raising concerns about the prioritization of economic interests over public health. Just weeks after Quebec City authorities announced improvements in air quality, new data emerged that contradicted these reports. Specifically, an air quality testing campaign revealed that the station on des Sables Road measured 120 nanograms of nickel per cubic metre of air, surpassing the newer, more permissive standard of 70 nanograms. This limit had been exceeded on three separate occasions up to April 28, 2023. Local representatives, such as Raymond Poirier, president of the Vieux-Limoilou neighbourhood council, condemned the discrepancies, describing them as a case of "unacceptable laxity." The sentiment was echoed by Sol Zanetti, the local Québec Solidaire MNA, who criticized the environment minister for not adequately enforcing air quality standards. Zanetti accused the Coalition Avenir Québec government of compromising public health to appease multinational corporations. This was in reference to the government's decision in 2020 to relax nickel emission levels from 14 nanograms per cubic metre to 70, ostensibly to attract the nickel-based battery industry. Gabriel Nadeau-Dubois, a spokesperson for Québec Solidaire, emphasized that the government should not have to choose between economic development and public health, particularly given that the new lax standards still couldn't be effectively maintained.

=== Government and Officials' Response ===
Despite the criticisms, Environment Minister Benoit Charette asserted that improved air quality in Limoilou was achievable. He mentioned independent reports confirming the enhancement of air quality and added that control measures were under consideration, with potential sanctions for non-compliance. However, these assurances did little to placate concerns. Poirier, having initiated a citizen-led program named Limoilair to monitor emissions, expressed frustration with the perceived lack of sincerity from those responsible. The opposition at the municipal level also echoed similar concerns. Zanetti and Poirier both highlighted the importance of making air quality data readily available to the residents of Limoilou. They stressed the necessity for real-time data to ensure effective monitoring and enforcement. Zanetti argued that with Quebec's substantial budget, there should be no excuse for the lack of knowledge and enforcement concerning the quality of air residents were breathing.
