= Lac-Saint-Charles–Saint-Émile =

Coordinates: 46°53′N 71°21′W

Lac-Saint-Charles–Saint-Émile (French pronunciation: [lak sɛ̃ ʃaʁl sɛ̃t‿emil]) is the northernmost district of Quebec City located in the borough of La Haute-Saint-Charles.

The district was created following an electoral reorganization in 2009. Before the 2000–2006 municipal reorganization in Quebec, the area was occupied by the cities of Saint-Émile and Lac-Saint-Charles.
