= Patrick Poulin =

Canadian ice hockey player (born 1973)

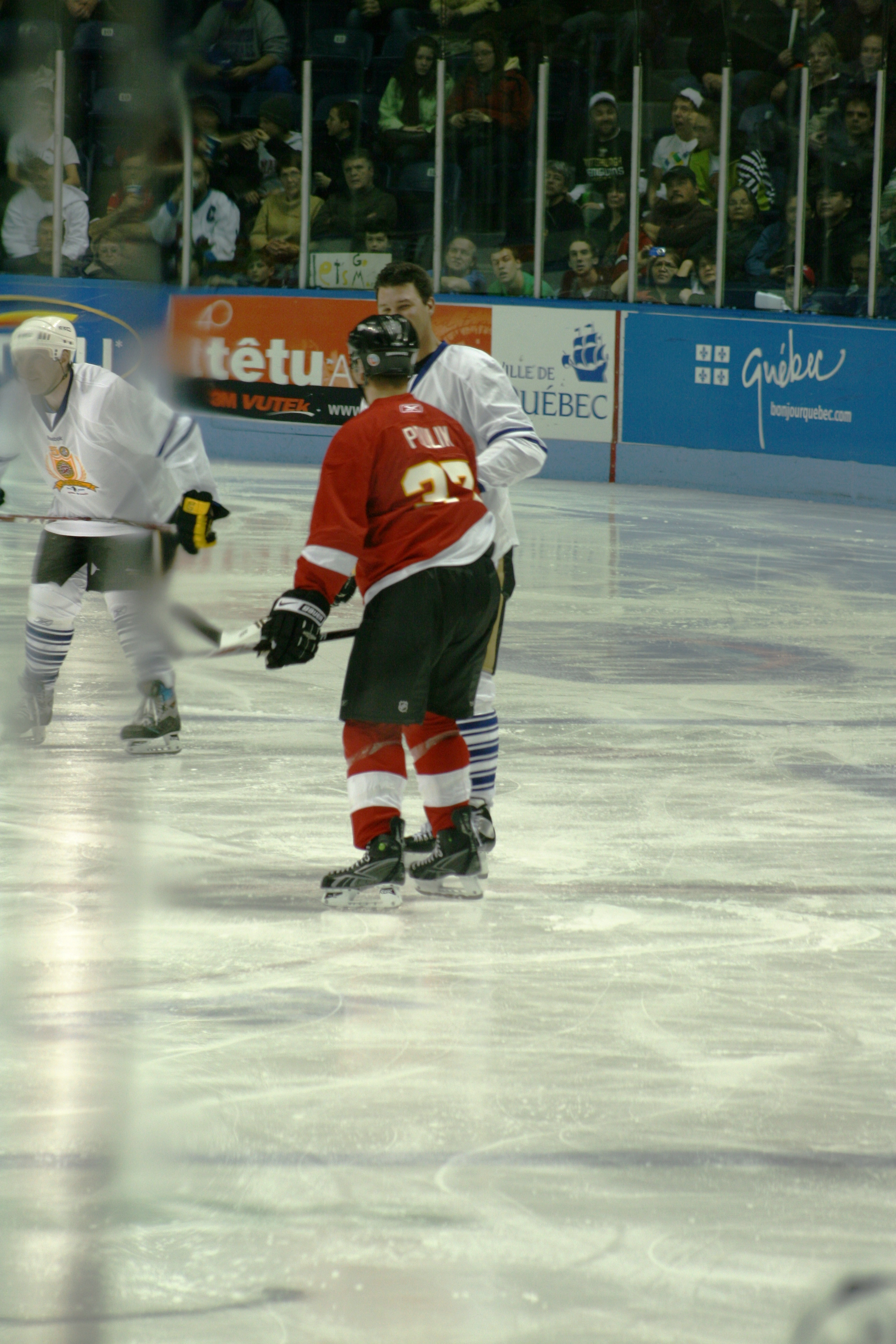
- Born: April 23, 1973 (age 53) Vanier, Quebec, Canada
- Height: 6 ft 1 in (185 cm)
- Weight: 216 lb (98 kg; 15 st 6 lb)
- Position: Centre
- Shot: Left
- Played for: Hartford Whalers; Chicago Blackhawks; Tampa Bay Lightning; Montreal Canadiens
- NHL draft: 9th overall, 1991; Hartford Whalers
- Playing career: 1991–2002

Joseph Emelien Patrick Poulin (born April 23, 1973) is a Canadian former professional ice hockey player who played 634 games in the National Hockey League (NHL) between 1991 and 2002.

== Biography ==
Poulin was born in Vanier, Quebec. As a youth, he played in four consecutive Quebec International Pee-Wee Hockey Tournaments from 1984 to 1987, with the Quebec Fleur-de-lis minor ice hockey team.

He played for the Hartford Whalers, Chicago Blackhawks, Tampa Bay Lightning and Montreal Canadiens after being selected ninth overall in the 1991 NHL entry draft from the Saint-Hyacinthe Laser.

Poulin's son, Samuel, was chosen 21st overall by the Pittsburgh Penguins in the 2019 NHL entry draft.

== Career statistics ==
=== Regular season and playoffs ===
			Regular season					Playoffs
Season	Team	League	GP	G	A	Pts	PIM	GP	G	A	Pts	PIM
1988–89	Sainte-Foy Gouverneurs	QMAAA	42	28	42	70	44	13	13	23	36	24
1989–90	Saint-Hyacinthe Laser	QMJHL	60	25	26	51	55	12	1	9	10	5
1990–91	Saint-Hyacinthe Laser	QMJHL	56	32	38	70	82	4	1	1	2	6
1991–92	Saint-Hyacinthe Laser	QMJHL	56	52	86	138	58	5	2	2	4	4
1991–92	Springfield Indians	AHL	—	—	—	—	—	1	0	0	0	0
1991–92	Hartford Whalers	NHL	1	0	0	0	2	7	2	1	3	0
1992–93	Hartford Whalers	NHL	81	20	31	51	37	—	—	—	—	—
1993–94	Hartford Whalers	NHL	9	2	1	3	11	—	—	—	—	—
1993–94	Chicago Blackhawks	NHL	58	12	13	25	40	4	0	0	0	0
1994–95	Chicago Blackhawks	NHL	45	15	15	30	53	16	4	1	5	8
1995–96	Indianapolis Ice	IHL	1	0	1	1	0	—	—	—	—	—
1995–96	Chicago Blackhawks	NHL	38	7	8	15	16	—	—	—	—	—
1995–96	Tampa Bay Lightning	NHL	8	0	1	1	0	2	0	0	0	0
1996–97	Tampa Bay Lightning	NHL	73	12	14	26	56	—	—	—	—	—
1997–98	Tampa Bay Lightning	NHL	44	2	7	9	19	—	—	—	—	—
1997–98	Montreal Canadiens	NHL	34	4	6	10	8	3	0	0	0	0
1998–99	Montreal Canadiens	NHL	81	8	17	25	21	—	—	—	—	—
1999–2000	Montreal Canadiens	NHL	82	10	5	15	17	—	—	—	—	—
2000–01	Montreal Canadiens	NHL	52	9	11	20	13	—	—	—	—	—
2001–02	Quebec Citadelles	AHL	31	12	7	19	6	3	0	2	2	0
2001–02	Montreal Canadiens	NHL	28	0	5	5	6	—	—	—	—	—
NHL totals			634	101	134	235	299	32	6	2	8	8

=== International ===
Year	Team	Event	GP	G	A	Pts	PIM
1992	Canada	WJC	7	2	2	4	2

Preceded by Mark Greig	Hartford Whalers first-round draft pick 1991	Succeeded by Róbert Petrovický
