= List of boroughs in Quebec =

This is a list of boroughs (arrondissements) in Quebec. Boroughs are provincially organized recognized sub-municipal administrative divisions that have mayors and councillors.

== List ==
=== Grenville-sur-la-Rouge ===
- Calumet
- Grenville

=== Longueuil ===
- Greenfield Park
- Le Vieux-Longueuil
- Saint-Hubert

=== Lévis ===
- Desjardins
- Les Chutes-de-la-Chaudière-Est
- Les Chutes-de-la-Chaudière-Ouest

=== Montreal ===
- Ahuntsic-Cartierville
- Anjou
- Côte-des-Neiges–Notre-Dame-de-Grâce
- L'Île-Bizard–Sainte-Geneviève
- LaSalle
- Lachine
- Le Plateau-Mont-Royal
- Le Sud-Ouest
- Mercier–Hochelaga-Maisonneuve
- Montréal-Nord
- Outremont
- Pierrefonds-Roxboro
- Rivière-des-Prairies–Pointe-aux-Trembles
- Rosemont–La Petite-Patrie
- Saint-Laurent
- Saint-Léonard
- Verdun
- Ville-Marie
- Villeray–Saint-Michel–Parc-Extension

=== Métis-sur-Mer ===
- MacNider

=== Quebec City ===
- Beauport
- Charlesbourg
- La Cité-Limoilou
- La Haute-Saint-Charles
- Les Rivières
- Sainte-Foy–Sillery–Cap-Rouge

=== Saguenay ===
- Chicoutimi
- Jonquière
- La Baie

=== Sherbrooke ===
- Brompton
- Fleurimont
- Jacques-Cartier
- Lennoxville
- Mont-Bellevue
- Rock Forest–Saint-Élie–Deauville

== See also ==
- Local government in Quebec
