= Lac-Delage =

- City
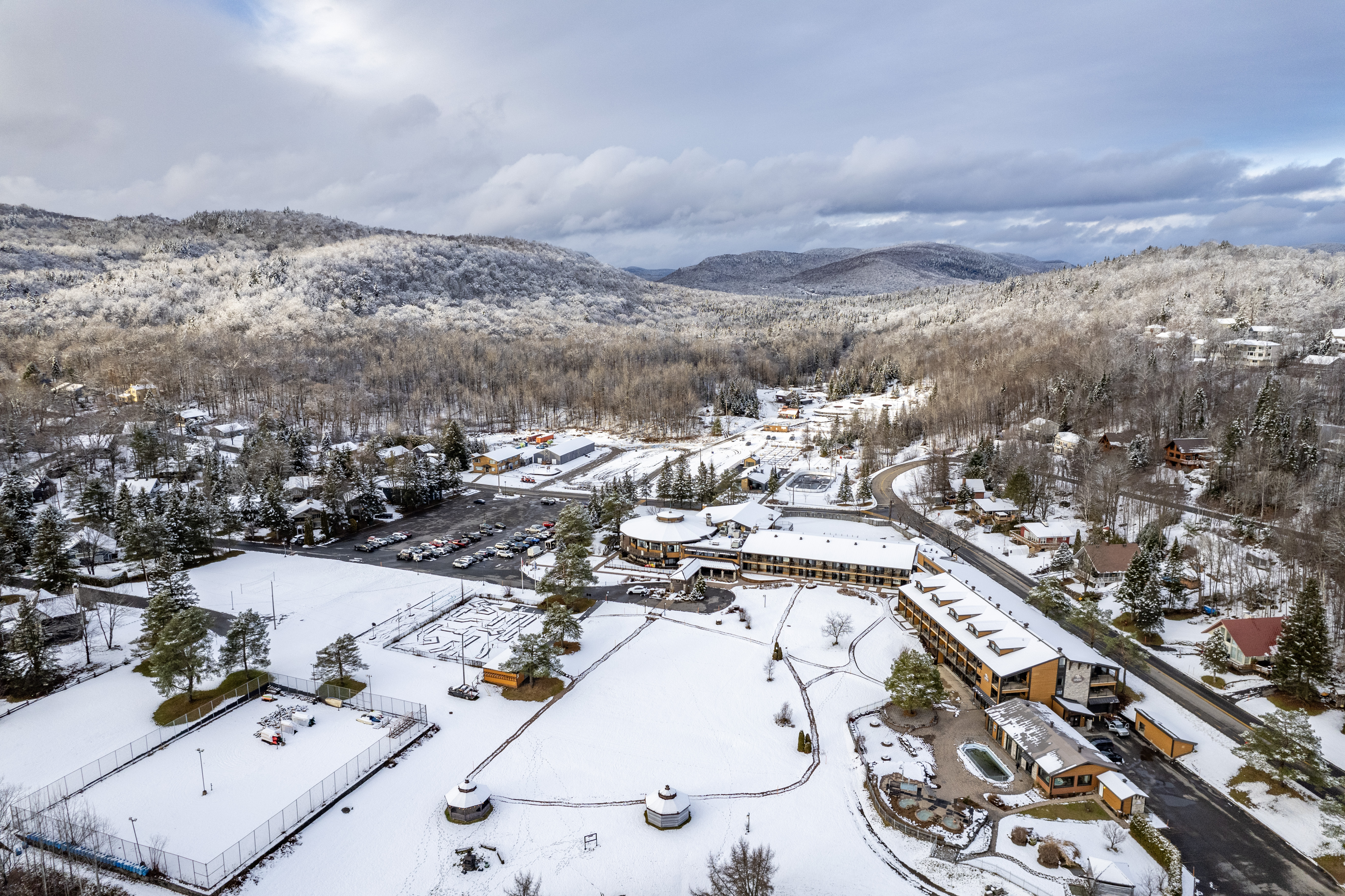

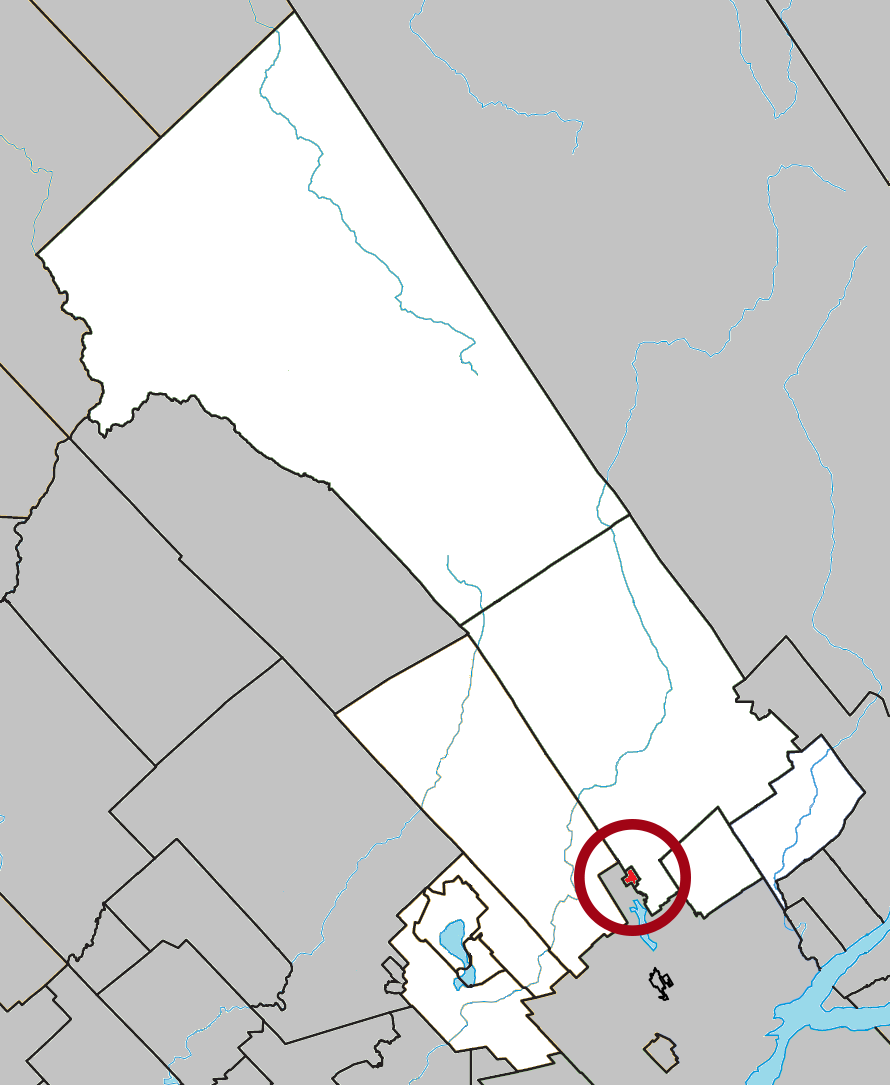
- Location within La Jacques-Cartier RCM

- Location in central Quebec
- Coordinates: 46°58′N 71°24′W
- Country: Canada
- Province: Quebec
- Region: Capitale-Nationale
- RCM: La Jacques-Cartier
- Constituted: February 11, 1959

Government
  - Mayor: Guy Rochette
  - Fed. riding: Saint-Augustin—Portneuf—Jacques-Cartier
  - Prov. riding: Chauveau

Area
  - Total: 2.11 km^{2} (0.81 sq mi)
  - Land: 1.58 km^{2} (0.61 sq mi)

Population (2021)
  - Total: 771
  - Density: 486.9/km^{2} (1,261/sq mi)
  - Pop (2016-21): ▲20.8%
  - Dwellings: 316
- Time zone: UTC−5 (EST)
  - Summer (DST): UTC−4 (EDT)
- Postal code(s): G3C 5A4
- Area codes: 418, 581
- Highways: No major routes
- Website: www.lacdelage.qc.ca

Lac-Delage (French pronunciation: [lak dəlaʒ]) is a town in the Capitale-Nationale region of Quebec, Canada, located on the eponymous Lake Delage.

== History ==
The town saw its beginning in the 1950s when summer visitors came to the lake, which was originally called Lake Larron. It was renamed to Lake Delage by then Quebec Premier Maurice Duplessis in honour of Cyrille-Fraser Delâge. Duplessis also granted the development of the resort and town. On February 11, 1959, the City of Lac-Delage was incorporated out of territory ceded by the Municipality of Stoneham and the Municipality of Lac Saint-Charles.

== Demographics ==
In the 2021 Census of Population conducted by Statistics Canada, Lac-Delage had a population of 771 living in 308 of its 316 total private dwellings, a change of 20.8% from its 2016 population of 638. With a land area of 1.58 km^{2} (0.61 sq mi), it had a population density of 488.0/km^{2} (1,263.8/sq mi) in 2021.

Historical census populations – Lac-Delage

Year	Pop.	±%
1961	4	—
1966	14	+250.0%
1971	59	+321.4%
1976	194	+228.8%
1981	259	+33.5%
1986	290	+12.0%
1991	338	+16.6%

Year	Pop.	±%
1996	368	+8.9%
2001	447	+21.5%
2006	530	+18.6%
2011	598	+12.8%
2016	638	+6.7%
2021	771	+20.8%

Source: Statistics Canada

Mother tongue (2021):

- English as first language: 1.3%
- French as first language: 92.9%
- English and French as first languages: 1.9%
- Other as first language: 2.6%

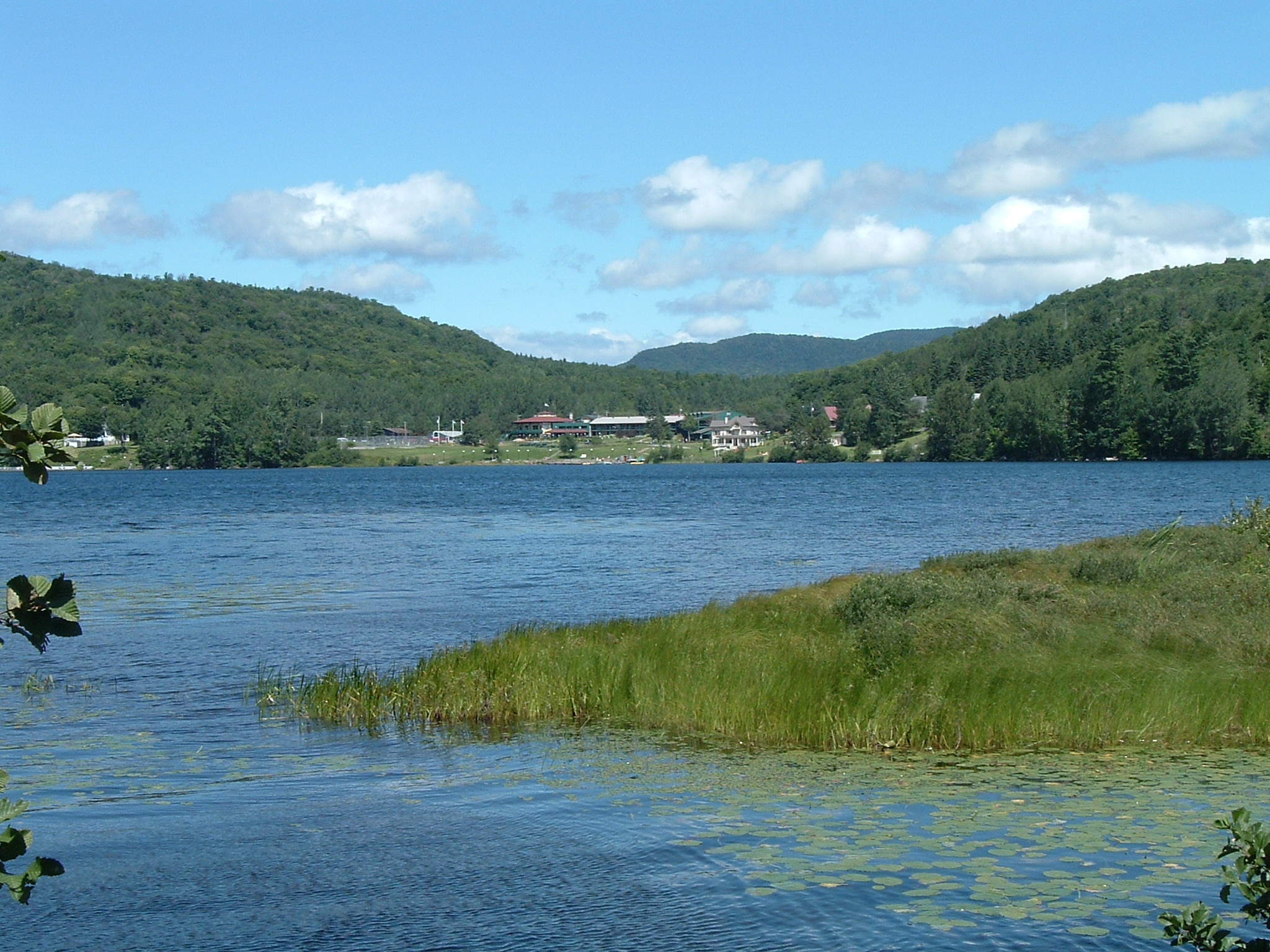
Lake Delage

== Government ==
Lac-Delage forms part of the federal electoral district of Saint-Augustin—Portneuf—Jacques-Cartier and has been represented by Joël Godin of the Conservative Party since 2015. Provincially, Lac-Delage is part of the Chauveau electoral district and is represented by Sylvain Lévesque of the Coalition Avenir Québec since 2018.

Lac-Delage federal election results
Year	Liberal		Conservative		Bloc Québécois		New Democratic		Green	
2021	18%	98	36%	191	33%	178	8%	45	0%	0
2019	30%	155	25%	129	31%	160	6%	31	5%	24

Lac-Delage provincial election results
Year	CAQ		Liberal		QC solidaire		Parti Québécois	
2018	38%	150	24%	95	17%	70	15%	61
2014	49%	194	19%	78	8%	31	23%	92

=== Municipal council ===
- Mayor: Alexandre Pelletier
- Councillors: Frédéric Paré-Campeau, Alexandre Morin, Véronique Bélanger, France Ouellet, Karine C.-Chalifour, Thibaud Dezutter

== See also ==
- List of cities in Quebec
