= Les Rivières, Quebec City =

Les Rivières
- Borough
- Les Rivières within Quebec City

- Coordinates: 46°49′50″N 71°18′20″W
- Country: Canada
- Province: Quebec
- Region: Capitale-Nationale
- Effective: January 1, 2002

Government
  - Borough mayor: Gérald Poirier
- Time zone: UTC−5 (EST)
  - Summer (DST): UTC−4 (EDT)
- Postal code(s): G
- Area codes: 418 and 581
- Website: www.ville.quebec.qc.ca

Les Rivières (French pronunciation: [le ʁivjɛʁ]. The Rivers) is a borough of Quebec City, Quebec, Canada. Population (2006): 59,920. It comprises 5 neighbourhoods: Neufchâtel-Est, Lebourgneuf, Duberger, Les Saules and Vanier. Except for Vanier, all of these neighbourhoods were part of the pre-2002 city of Quebec.

== Description ==
Les Rivières is one of the six boroughs of Quebec City. It takes its name from the Saint-Charles River that passes through the borough as well as two tributaries rivers of Saint-Charles: Berger and Lorette. The borough is geographically located in the centre of Quebec City and contains the Galeries de la Capitale shopping centre.

Les Rivières borough vastly corresponds to the Rivières section of the former city of Québec (Québec City as it was known before the 2002 municipal reorganization). The borough also include the former city of Vanier which was merged into Quebec City in 2002.

The Rivières section of the former city was made of four municipalities that were annexed to Quebec City in the 1970s. They were Duberger, Les Saules, Neufchâtel and Charlesbourg-Ouest. These former municipalities kept their respective name as neighbourhoods of Quebec City with the exception of Charlesbourg-Ouest which was renamed Lebourgneuf. Lebourgneuf got its name as a portmanteau from the last letters of Charlesbourg and the first letters Neufchatel because Charlesbourg-Ouest was located between Charlesbourg and Neufchâtel.

Following the creation of the new city of Quebec in 2002, Neufchâtel was dismantled, with most of it going to La Haute-Saint-Charles borough. The part of Neufchâtel that was retained by Les Rivières borough became Neufchâtel-Est.

The borough is mostly an industrial area with a few residential neighbourhoods (Vanier, Duberger and Les Saules.) In recent years the population has increased following a large amount of residential development, particularity the construction of condos along Boulevard Robert-Bourassa.

== See also ==
- Municipal reorganization in Quebec
