= Saint-Émile, Quebec City =

Saint-Émile
- Interactive map of Saint-Émile
- Coordinates: 46°52′14.7″N 71°20′15.3″W
- Province: Quebec

Saint-Émile (French pronunciation: [sɛ̃t‿emil]) is a former city in central Quebec, Canada. It was amalgamated into Quebec City on January 1, 2002. It is located within the Borough of La Haute-Saint-Charles. Population: (2008) 10,989. http://www.toponymie.gouv.qc.ca/ct/topos/odo.asp?Speci=282276

== Churches ==
- Saint-Émile Church
