= Val-Bélair, Quebec City =

Former city amalgamated into Quebec City

Val-Bélair
- Administrative Sector
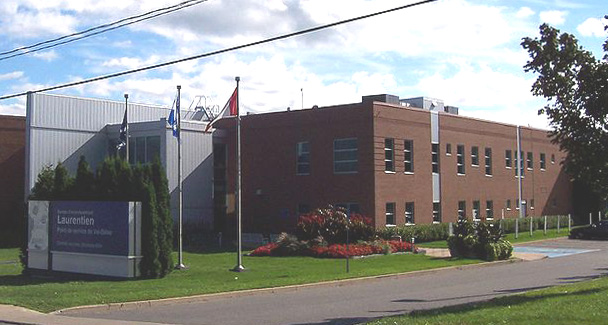
- A service point of Val Bélair in 2007
- Interactive map of Val-Bélair
- Coordinates: 46°51′50″N 71°26′0″W
- Country: Canada
- Province: Quebec
- City: Quebec City
- Merged into Quebec City: 2002 (municipal reorganization)

Population (2015)
  - Total: 23,798
- Time zone: UTC−5 (EST)
  - Summer (DST): UTC−4 (EDT)

Val-Bélair (French pronunciation: [val belɛʁ]) is a former city located near the St. Lawrence River in Quebec, Canada. It was amalgamated into Quebec City on January 1, 2002. More specifically, it is within the region of La Haute-Saint-Charles.

Population:

- (2001) 21,332
- (2015) 23,798

== See also ==
- List of former cities in Quebec
- Municipal reorganization in Quebec
