= Vanier, Quebec City =

Coordinates: 46°49′13.3″N 71°15′59.5″W

Vanier (French pronunciation: [vanje]) is a former city in central Quebec, Canada. It was amalgamated into Quebec City in 2002. It is located within the Borough of Les Rivières. Population (2001): 11,504

Fleur de Lys centre commercial, a shopping centre is located in Vanier. It is contains a mix of residential and industrial areas and is considered a working class district of the city. The southern portion of the district follows a grid pattern layout and contains many 2 story duplex properties and a high school, whilst the northern part is more suburban in nature and contains more single story homes.
