= La Haute-Saint-Charles, Quebec City =

La Haute-Saint-Charles
- Borough
- La Haute-Saint-Charles within Quebec City
- Coordinates: 46°53′25″N 71°22′20″W
- Country: Canada
- Province: Quebec
- Region: Capitale-Nationale
- Effective: January 1, 2002

Government
  - Borough mayor: Simon Brouard
- Time zone: UTC−5 (EST)
  - Summer (DST): UTC−4 (EDT)
- Postal code(s): G
- Area codes: 418 and 581
- Website: www.ville.quebec.qc.ca

La Haute-Saint-Charles (French pronunciation: [la ot sɛ̃ ʃaʁl]) is a borough of Quebec City. Population (2006): 74,070. It comprises Lac-Saint-Charles, Saint-Émile, Neufchâtel, Loretteville and Val-Bélair.

It also entirely surrounds the urban Indian reserve of Wendake, which is autonomous from the borough.

== See also ==
- Municipal reorganization in Quebec
- Lac-Saint-Charles–Saint-Émile
