= Loretteville, Quebec City =

Neighborhood in Quebec City, Canada

Coordinates: 46°51′N 71°22′W

Loretteville (French pronunciation: [lɔʁɛtvil]) is a former city in central Quebec, Canada. It was amalgamated into Quebec City on January 1, 2002. It is located within the borough of La Haute-Saint-Charles, and also contains the upmarket neighbourhood of Montchâtel.

== Demographics ==
Its population in 2001 was 13,737 residents.

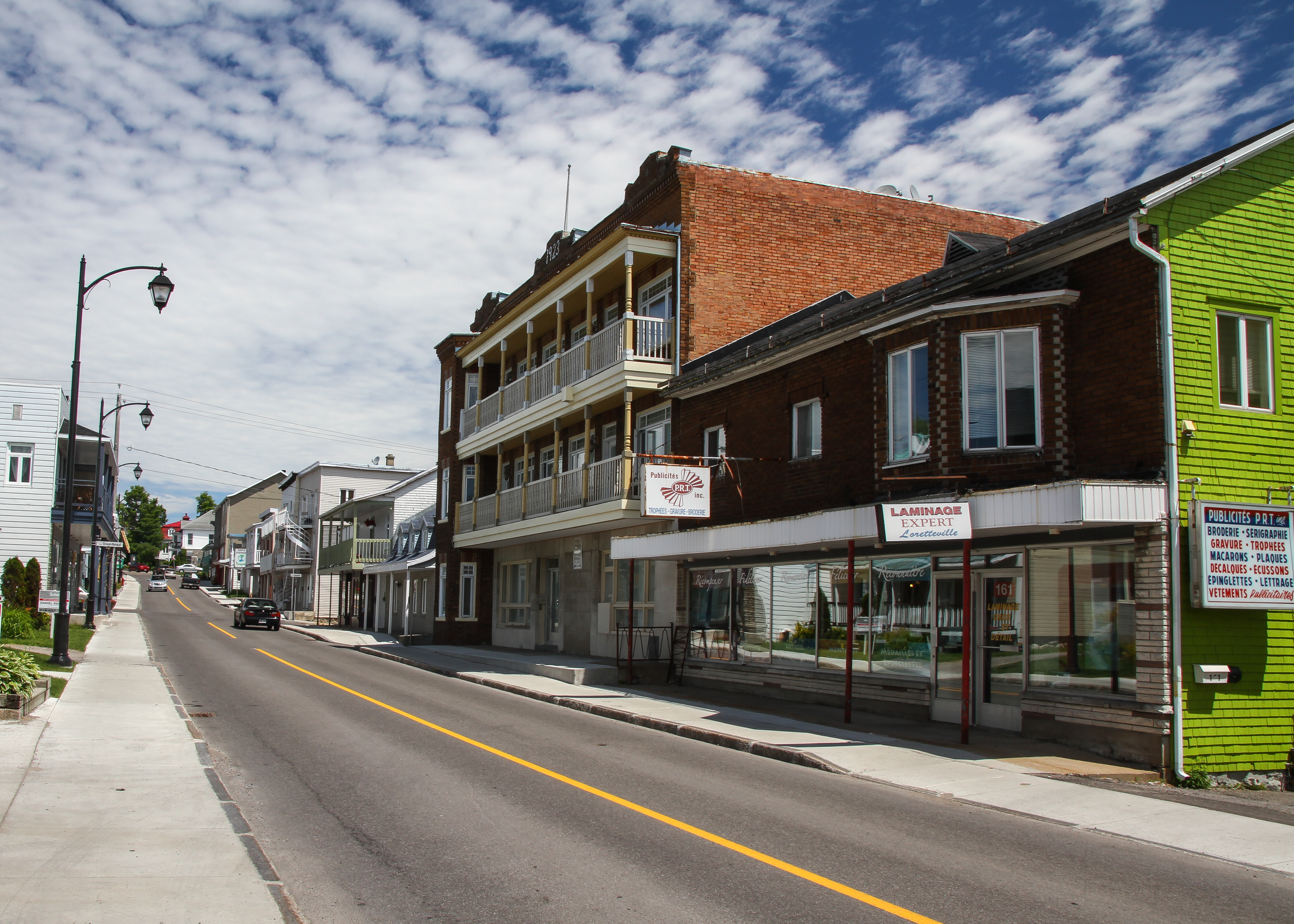
Racine Street (rue Racine) in Loretteville

== Notable people ==
- André-Philippe Gagnon (born 1962), comedian and impressionist
- Geneviève Castrée (1981–2016), musician and cartoonist
- Gérard Deltell (born 1964), politician
- Mitsou (born 1970), pop singer
- Myriam Bédard (born 1969), Olympic athlete.
- Mike Ward (comedian) (Born 1973), Comedian
- Jocelyne Gros-Louis founded Corporation du Boisson
