= Lac-Saint-Charles, Quebec City =

District in Quebec, Canada

Coordinates: 46.91°N 71.375°W

Lac-Saint-Charles
- District of Quebec City; Former city
- Interactive map of Lac-Saint-Charles
- Country: Canada
- Province: Quebec
- City: Quebec City
- Borough: La Haute-Saint-Charles
- Established: 1946

Population (2011)
  - Total: 9,886
- Time zone: EST (UTC−05:00)
  - Summer (DST): EDT (UTC−04:00)
- Amalgamated: 1 January 2002

Lac-Saint-Charles (French pronunciation: [lak sɛ̃ ʃaʁl]) is a former city in Quebec and is now a district of the Quebec City borough of La Haute-Saint-Charles. The population as of the Canada 2011 Census was 9,886.

It existed from 1946 until being amalgamated into Quebec City in 2002.
