= Boroughs of Quebec City =

Boroughs of Quebec City prior to October 31, 2009.

Current boroughs of Quebec City as of November 1.

Quebec City is divided into six arrondissements or boroughs. These boroughs are the result of several waves of amalgamation and reorganization of the political boundaries of Quebec City.

- La Cité-Limoilou
- Les Rivières
- Sainte-Foy–Sillery–Cap-Rouge
- Charlesbourg
- Beauport
- La Haute-Saint-Charles

The six boroughs are further divided into 36 quartiers ("neighbourhoods"), which are as of 2005 numbered instead of named.

== 2002–2009 ==
From January 1, 2002 to October 31, 2009, the city had eight boroughs: La Cité, Les Rivières, Sainte-Foy–Sillery, Charlesbourg, Beauport, Limoilou, La Haute-Saint-Charles and Laurentien. The boroughs of La Cité and Limoilou were merged on November 1, while the borough of Laurentien was dissolved and divided between Sainte-Foy–Sillery–Cap-Rouge and La Haute-Saint-Charles.

== Former ==
Formerly, Quebec was divided into administrative districts, named quartiers, which were redivided amongst arrondissements at the time of the 2002 city mergers in Quebec.

- Cap-Blanc
- Duberger
- Lairet
- Lebourgneuf
- Les Saules
- Maizerets
- Montcalm
- Neufchatel
- Saint-Roch
- Saint-Jean-Baptiste
- Saint-Sacrement
- Saint-Sauveur
- Vieux-Québec–Basse-Ville
- Vieux-Québec–Haute-Ville

== Former cities ==
Former cities are still commonly referred to by their former names even though their administrative structures no longer exist. This list includes cities that were merged in 2002. They are not boroughs, but many would be considered neighbourhoods.

- Beauport
- Bourg-Royal
- Cap-Rouge
- Charlesbourg
- Charlesbourg-Est
- Château-d'Eau
- Château-Bigot
- Courville
- Giffard
- L'Auvergne
- Lac-Saint-Charles
- Le Plateau
- Loretteville
- Montmorency
- Notre-Dame-des-Laurentides
- Orsainville
- Parc-L'Ormière
- Saint-Joseph
- Saint-Bonaventure
- Saint-Émile
- Sainte-Thérèse-de-Lisieux
- Sainte-Foy
- Sillery
- Val-Bélair
- Val-Saint-Michel
- Vanier
- Villeneuve
