= List of presidents of districts of Quebec City =

Every borough has its own president.

== La Cité ==
- January 1, 2002 - January 1, 2006: Yvon Bussières
- November 6, 2006- November 6, 2009: Louise Lapointe

== Les Rivières ==
- January 1, 2002 - January 1, 2006: Gérald Poirier
- November 6, 2006- November 6, 2009: Gérald Poirier

== Sainte-Foy–Sillery ==
- January 1, 2002 - January 1, 2006: Gilles Latulippe
- November 6, 2006- November 6, 2009: Francine Bouchard-Boutet

== Charlesbourg ==
- January 1, 2002 - January 1, 2006: Ralph Mercier
- November 6, 2006- November 6, 2009: Jean-Marie Laliberté

== Beauport ==
- January 1, 2002 - January 1, 2006: Jacques Langlois
- November 6, 2006- November 6, 2009: André Letendre

== Limoilou ==
- January 1, 2002 - January 1, 2006: France Dupont
- November 6, 2006- November 6, 2009: Alain Loubier

== La Haute-Saint-Charles ==
- January 1, 2002 - January 1, 2006: Renaud Auclair
- November 6, 2006- November 6, 2009:

== Laurentien ==
- January 1, 2002 - January 1, 2006: Marcel Corriveau
- November 6, 2006- November 6, 2009: Jean-Marie Matte
