= Quebecair Flight 255 =

1979 aviation accident

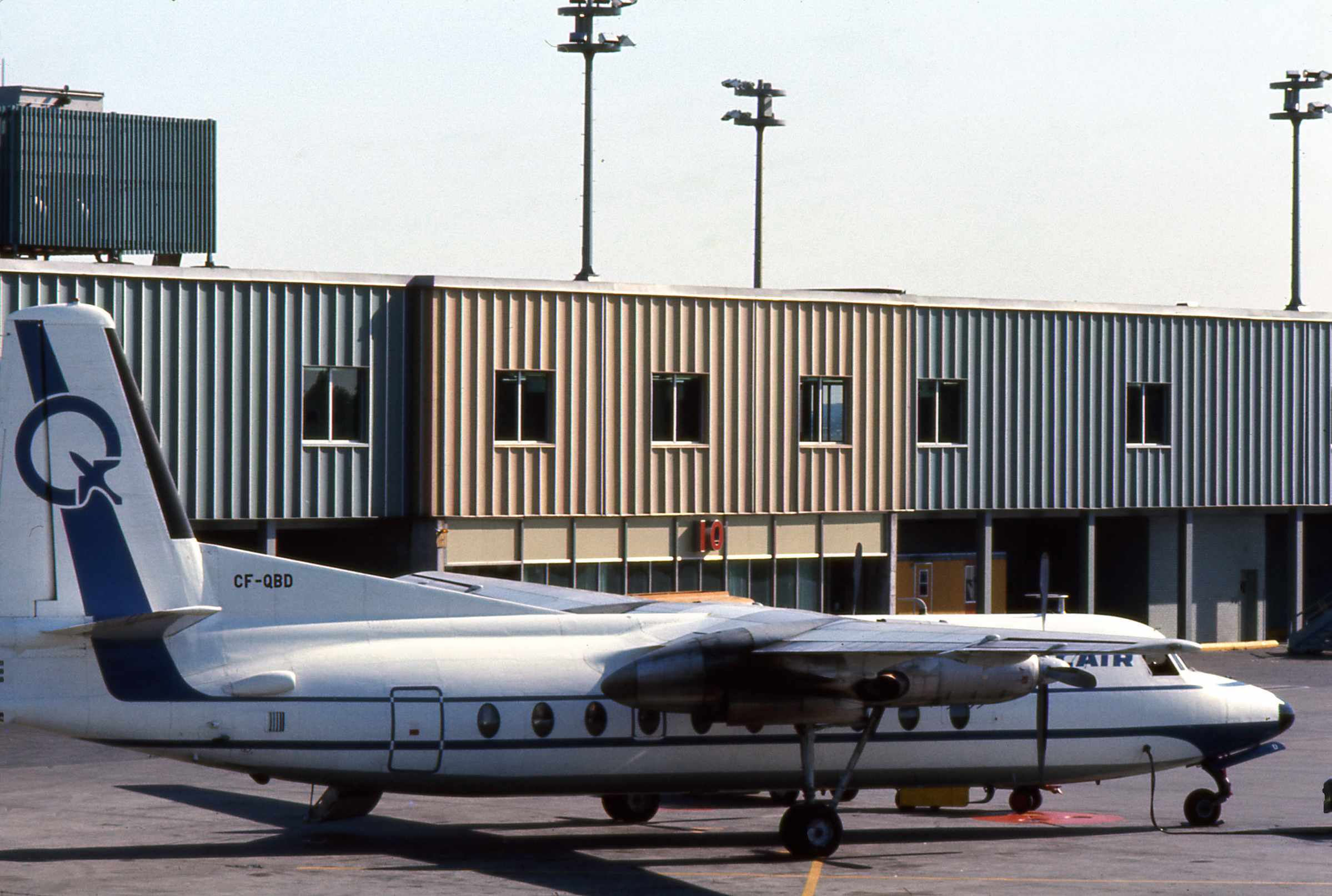
- A Fairchild F-27 similar to the aircraft involved in the accident

Accident
- Date: 29 March 1979
- Summary: Uncontained engine failure leading to engine separation and loss of control
- Site: Quebec City; 46°47′14.1072″N 71°21′50.0112″W

Aircraft
- Aircraft type: Fairchild F-27
- Operator: Quebecair
- IATA flight No.: QB255
- ICAO flight No.: QBA255
- Call sign: QUEBECAIR 255
- Registration: C-FQBL
- Flight origin: Jean Lesage International Airport
- Destination: Montreal-Dorval International Airport
- Occupants: 24
- Passengers: 21
- Crew: 3
- Fatalities: 17
- Survivors: 7

Quebecair Flight 255 was a scheduled flight from Quebec City to Montreal. On March 29, 1979, moments after takeoff at 6:48:43 PM (local time), the right engine of the Fairchild F-27 that was operating the flight exploded and caught fire. The crippled aircraft, registered C-FQBL, crashed soon after in a nearby field. All three crew and 14 of the 21 passengers died.

== Accident ==
At 6:48:43 PM, the 21 year-old Fairchild F-27 took off from Jean Lesage International Airport (then known as Aéroport de l'Ancienne-Lorette or Aéroport de Sainte-Foy). Almost immediately, pilot André Bessette alerted the control tower to a fire within their right engine, which quickly spread along the whole wing. The crew attempted to circle back to the airport for an emergency landing, only to crash in what was then a sloping farm field, about 1,3 km (0.8 mile) east of the airport's nearest runway. (Note: In 1994, 15 years after the event, some of the surrounding land where the crash occurred, including the farm field, was developed into a golf course. The precise location of the crash does not seem to have been recorded by available sources, but this estimation is nonetheless based on reliable information. A photo from the Journal de Québec article shows an aerial view of the crash site, in relation to the rue de Champigny Est and the still-standing homes (as of 2025) that are mentioned in the article from Le Soleil. The same article also mentions that the site was located approximately 1500 feet (457 m) north of Boulevard Wilfrid-Hamel and about 1000 feet (305 m) from the grounds of the Maison mère des Frères du Sacré Cœur.) The crash caused an explosion leading to a fire. Firefighters managed to bring under control the fire after one hour.

According to witnesses, the plane flew at a height of not more than 200 feet (61 m) when the right wing came into contact with the ground, causing the rest of the plane to roll upside down before it suddenly fell down on the ground "like a brick". The plane broke apart upon impact and the debris caught fire right away. The crash was seen and heard by a number of nearby residents, whose homes were in some cases located approximately only 200 meters (656 ft) away. They were amongst the first to reach the crash site along with some officers of the Service de Police de Sainte-Foy and lay brothers from the nearby Maison mère des Frères du Sacré Cœur, using pocket knives and home tools to free a few passengers who were still strapped to their seats. Two men supporting a woman, all of them injured, were able to get out of the wreckage on their own and walk down the field, despite their injuries. They were guided to a nearby house to wait for paramedics to reach the scene.

== Emergency response ==
At the time, the former city of Sainte-Foy (now a part of Quebec City) had emergency plans prepared in the event of a crash at or near the airport. However, a few unforeseen circumstances somewhat hampered the efficiency and the swiftness of the operations. The first setback occurred about 10 minutes after help first arrived on the scene, when one of the wings' fuel tank exploded, generating an intense, 15 meters-high (50 ft) burst of flames which forced the rescuers to back away momentarily.

Rescue efforts were further hindered by the lack of a proper, direct road access to the field. The fact that the event occurred in late March also meant that the thawing soil and the snowmelt made the ground too soft and muddy for heavy emergency vehicles to venture on. A fire truck attempted to reach the burning debris soon after the crash, but got stuck and had to be pulled out later by a road grader. The police eventually had to bring in tracked vehicles as it soon became clear that it would be the fastest and most efficient way to ferry the injured, the dead, first responders, as well as tools and supplies up and down the field.

== Survivors and victims ==
Despite these problems and the intensity of the fire, 19 out of the 24 people (crew included) who were on the plane were pulled from the wreckage, most of them badly injured. All were on their way to the nearest hospitals within half an hour. 11 were brought to the Centre hospitalier de l'Université Laval (CHUL) but 6 of them died on the way or shortly after their arrival. The remaining 8 were brought to Hôpital Laval, out of which only 2 survived. Two passengers, as well as the entire crew, consisting of Pilot André Bessette (a former Canadian Air Force pilot), First Officer Alain Willaume and flight attendant Danielle Ouellette were killed on impact. Bessette and Willaume's bodies were the last to be pulled out of the wreckage, the following morning. According to a survivor, (Note: Johanne de Montigny M.A.Ps., a survivor of the crash who sustained many severe injuries. Her recollections about the accident have often been cited over the years in French Canadian media. She was 29 years old at the time. The near-death experience she went through incited her to become a psychologist specialized in palliative care.) a man died on the plane right before the crash, possibly from a heart attack or some other undefined cause.

== Investigation ==
The cockpit voice recorder (CVR) and flight data recorder (FDR) were recovered but only the CVR provided "some useful information." The investigation was unable to determine the cause of the accident. The final report did not contain a probable cause statement.

Canadian investigators established that shortly after the twin-turboprop airliner lifted off, the low pressure impeller from the no. 2 engine burst, causing the forward part of the engine to separate. The flight crew were unable to raise the landing gear because debris from the engine damaged the electronic gear selection circuitry. This, together with the exposed engine, increased the aerodynamic drag dramatically, and the aircraft was unable to climb or maintain altitude during its final turn. The centre of gravity shifted beyond its aft limit due to the engine separation and passenger movement, causing the airspeed to drop below the minimum control speed shortly before the aircraft struck the hillside.
