= Blouin =

Blouin is a surname. Notable people with the surname include:

- Andrée Blouin (1921–1986), Central African Republic political activist, human rights advocate, and writer
- Anne Blouin (born 1946), Progressive Conservative party member of the Canadian House of Commons
- Daphnée Blouin (born 1998), Canadian soccer player
- Georges-Henri Blouin (1921–2007), Canadian diplomat
- Gustave Blouin (1912–2002), Canadian politician and manufacturer
- Johanne Blouin (born 1955), Canadian singer-songwriter
- Jocelyne Blouin (born 1950), Canadian meteorologist
- Laurie Blouin (born 1996), Canadian freestyle snowboarder
- Lise Blouin (born 1944), Canadian educator and novelist
- Louise Blouin (born 1958), French-Canadian magazine publisher and philanthropist
- Michael Blouin (writer), Canadian poet and writer
- Mike Blouin (born 1945), American politician, Democratic member of the United States House of Representatives
- Nate Blouin (born 1989), American politician and climate policy advocate
- Sylvain Blouin (born 1974), retired professional ice hockey player
