= Tisseyre =

Tisseyre is a French/Occitan surname. Notable people with the surname include:

- Magali Tisseyre (born 1981), Canadian triathlete
- Marc Tisseyre, French rugby player
- Michelle Tisseyre (1918–2014), Canadian television presenter, journalist and translator
- Pierre Tisseyre (1909–1995), French-born Canadian lawyer, journalist, writer and editor
- Yoan Tisseyre (born 1989), French rugby player
