= Francine Pelletier =

Francine Pelletier may refer to:

- Francine Pelletier (writer) (born 1959), Canadian science fiction author
- Francine Pelletier (journalist) (born c. 1955), Canadian television and print journalist
