= Michelle Tisseyre =

Canadian television presenter (1918 – 2014)

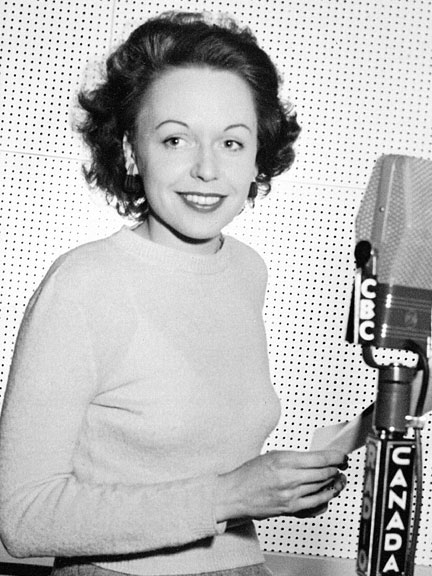
- Tisseyre in 1941
- Born: Mary Jane Michelle Ahern; 13 March 1918; Montreal, Quebec, Canada
- Died: 21 December 2014 (aged 96); Montreal, Quebec, Canada
- Occupations: Television host, journalist and translator
- Known for: First woman to present a "Grand Journal" newscast for CBC French services (Radio-Canada)
- Notable work: Translation of Winter by Morley Callaghan for which she won Governor General’s Literary Award

Michelle Tisseyre (née Ahern; 13 March 1918 – 21 December 2014) was a Canadian television presenter who also worked in the fields of journalism and translations. She joined Radio-Canada in 1941 and did pioneering work as a broadcasting journalist on the Canadian Broadcasting Corporation (CBC) radio and television till 1947. Thereafter, she worked freelance for some time and then rejoined Radio-Canada in 1950, and was its director from 1953 to 1960 when the first TV show TV-Montreal was launched. In 1941, she became the first woman to present a 15-minute newsletter broadcast in CBC's French services.

She lived to the age of 96. She received several awards for her career achievements, including the Governor General’s Literary Award for her translation of Winter (authored by Morley Callaghan), and being made an Officer of the Order of Canada for her work on publications. In 2001, at the age of 80, she returned to college, graduating in 2006 with a BA degree in Art History from McGill University.

== Early life ==
Tisseyre was born Mary Jane Michelle Ahern on 13 December 1918 at Montreal, Quebec. She was born in a well-to-do family. Her father was John G. Ahern, a lawyer and bâtonnier of the Province of Québec who was also president of the Québec Bar. Ahern was the son of Michael Joseph Ahern, a surgeon of the Hôtel-Dieu de Québec and Dean of the Faculty of Medicine at the Laval University. Her mother was Jeanne Marcil, daughter of Charles Marcil, who was a Member of Parliament for Bonaventure, Ottawa, for 36 years. Her mother divorced Ahern and moved to Sweden to reunite with her lover.

Initially, Tisseyre's education was in the Couvent du Sacré-Cœur de Sault-aux Récollets and at the Institut pédagogique de la Congrégation Notre-Dame. At the age of 12 she was hospitalized for one year for treatment for tuberculosis in the sanatorium in Saranac, Upstate New York. She then joined the McGill University in 1936 where she was the first French Canadian to be given admission to study history and philosophy. Here in 1937, she met Jacques de Brabant, director of Esterel resort in the Laurentien and married him. Following her marriage she discontinued her college studies. But this marriage did not last long as her husband left her for another woman during World War II; she divorced him in 1946. She was left with a child to manage on her own when she auditioned for employment with Radio Canada.

== Career ==
In 1941, encouraged by Roger Baulu, Tisseyre started working as an announcer with Radio-Canada and she had very good fluency in both French and English languages. As a woman she was the first to broadcast 15-minute newsletter of war for the CBC French services, much to the chagrin of Michel Ouimet who was then a well known reporter. She became the first woman journalist to interview Manuel Ávila Camacho, President of Mexico in 1944, and then such interviews became her special forte in reporting and interviewing. For three years, from 1944 to 1946, she was assigned to the CBC International Service. Along with René Lévesque and René Garneau, she was hostess of the show La voix du Canada, which was a special broadcast for the French armed forces of Canada working in various parts of the world during the war.

After the war, Tisseyre married for the second time on 17 January 1947. Her husband was Pierre Tisseyre (1905–95) who was a French writer and journalist and who had come to Canada in 1945. She then left her job with CBC in 1947 and became a freelance journalist.

From 1953 to 1962, Tisseyre was the presenter of the Rendez-vous avec Michelle (Meet Michelle), a CBC television talk show, the first such show on TV in Canada. During 1955 to 1960, she also hosted many shows for the Music Hall, interviewing famous artists like Édith Piaf, Jacques Brel, Charles Aznavour, Félix Leclerc and Jean-Pierre Ferland. At the start of her television shows, in 1953, she did a pre-planned stunt, in which she, as a slim presenter, flipped and overthrew a 6 ft 4 in (1.93 m) judo world champion when he had become aggressive.

During 1962 to 1970, along with Wilfrid Lemoyne, Tisseyre was the hostess of the show known as Aujourd’hui which was the first of its kind related to public affairs which was very popular with viewership of over one million, as the subject discussed related to the reforms to be implemented in Québec society.

Tisseyre's career achievement also covered writing weekly articles for ten years for a Photo-Journal. She also wrote for the La revue populaire and the La revue moderne. In 1965, she edited the L’Encyclopédie de la femme canadienne (Encyclopedia of Canadian Women).

Tisseyre started performing for the theater in 1948 with the radio play Les Dames de notre temps. She continued to act in different roles for theatres in Montréal, between 1949 and 1970; the plays she acted in were: as Armande in Les femmes savantes (1949), Elmire in Tartuffe by the playwright Molière (1952) and Noëlle in La facture of Françoise Dorin (1970).

Tisseyre took up the career of a translator after she left CBC in 1970. She associated with her husband to do translation work at Les Éditions Pierre Tisseyre, her husband's publishing house. As editor, she translated a number of French-language books such as: La Collection des deux Solitudes — a series of novels by English Canadians like Winter by Morley Callaghan, Margaret Laurence, W. O. Mitchell and Robertson Davies.

Tisseyre ventured into politics once during the referendum campaign of 1980 when she addressed the Montreal Forum, an assembly of 15,000 people, most of them women.

After Tisseyre's husband died in 1995, she pursued her studies at the McGill University and received a BA degree in 2006 when she was 88 years old.

Tisseyre wrote her memoirs titled Intimate memoirs in 1998.

== Personal life ==
Tisseyre had five children. Her son Charles Tisseyre became a television journalist and host of the science and technology series Découverte. On May 26, 1977, her granddaughter Yaya drowned; on July 28, 1993, her son François died in a plane crash; and on March 3, 1995, her husband died. She died on December 21, 2014, at the age of 96 in Montreal.

== Awards ==
The awards which Tisseyre received during her lifetime are:

- Trophée Frigon — Best Television Host (1959)
- Miss Radio-Télévision — Most Popular Artist (1959)
- Governor General’s Literary Award — Translation (1975)
- Member of the Order of Canada (1976)
- Médaille d’or de la Renaissance française (1997)
- Officer of the Order of Canada (2001)
- Queen Elizabeth II Diamond Jubilee Medal (2012)
