= Francine Pelletier (writer) =

Canadian science fiction writer (born 1959)

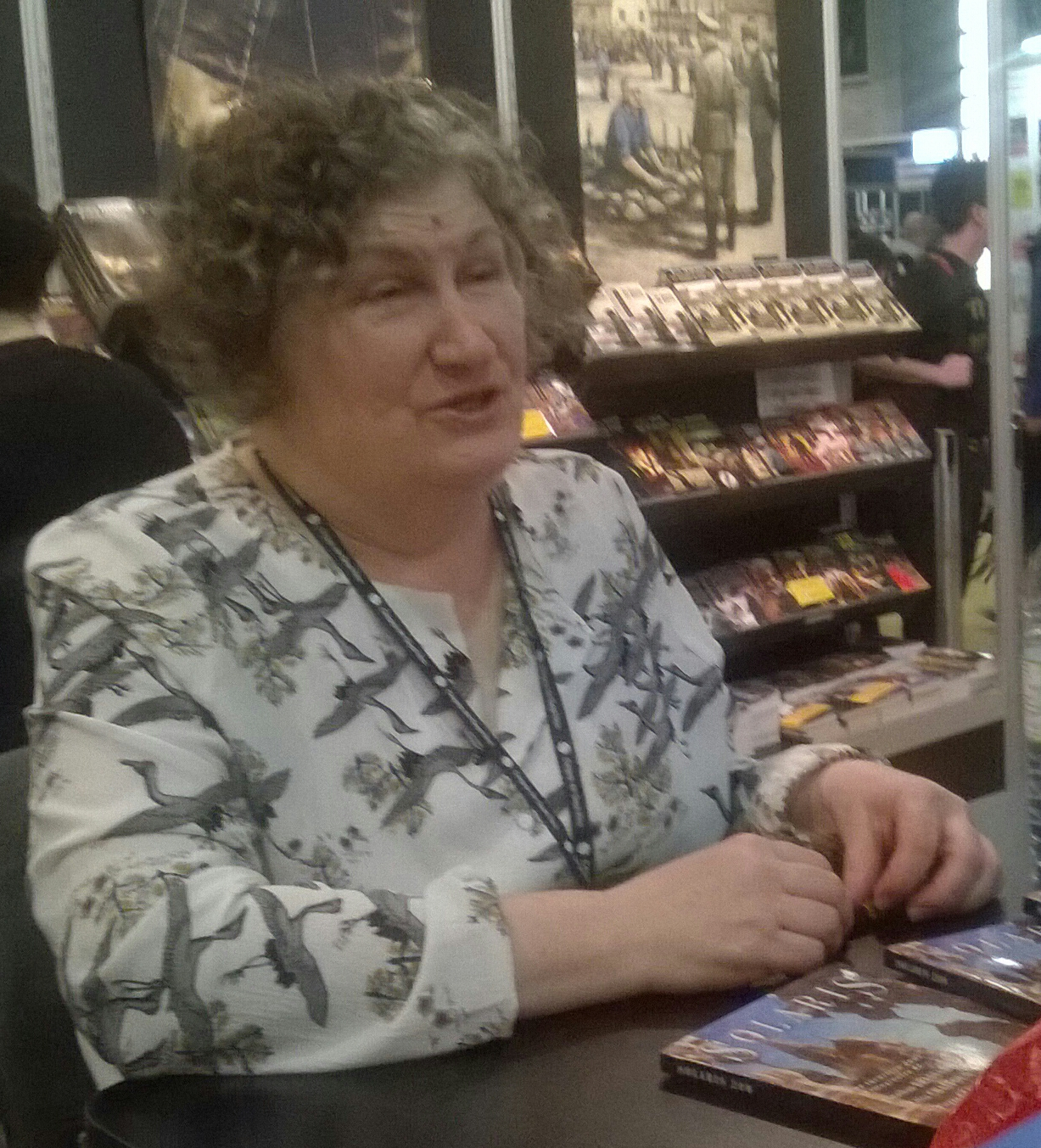
- Francine Pelletier in 2018
- Born: April 25, 1959 (age 67); Laval, Quebec, Canada
- Education: Université du Québec à Montréal
- Occupations: Novelist; Short story writer
- Writing career
- Language: French
- Years active: 1983–present
- Genres: Mystery; Science fiction; Young adult literature

Francine Pelletier (born 25 April 1959 in Laval, Quebec) is a Canadian science fiction writer, whose work often features strong female protagonists. She has been a winner of several literary prizes for science fiction, including the Prix Aurora Award.

She has published over 20 novels for young readers, mostly in the science fiction and mystery genres, and dozens of short stories, as well as a few science-fiction novels for adults. Some of her work has been translated into English.

== Career ==
Palletier was interested in reading, and particularly fiction, from a young age.

Pelletier studied at Université du Québec à Montréal. She was introduced to science fiction writing by Élisabeth Vonarburg from 1981 to 1986. In 1983 she began publishing her work in magazines, including Imagine, Moebius, and Solaris. She wrote her first youth novel, Le Rendez-vous du désert, at the insistence of Daniel Sernine, the literary director of Jeunesse Pop, an imprint of Paulines. She attended the sixth International Science Fiction and Imaginary Week held in Roanne, France in 1989.

She was a member of Solaris's editorial board from 1984 to 1990. In 1987 she joined the Union des écrivaines et des écrivains québécois (Union of Québécois Writers). From 1990 to 1993, she served on the management committee of Communication-Jeunesse. Beginning in 1993, she began working for Médiaspaul as an executive secretary. She continued working part-time for the publisher until at least 1998.

Pelletier has said she enjoys the work of fellow science fiction authors Ursula K. Le Guin, Esther Rochon, Joan D. Vinge, and Connie Willis.

== Bibliography ==
=== Youth fiction ===
- Le Temps des migrations (Recueil, Le Préambule, Chroniques du futur 11, 1987)
- Jardins de lumière. Graficor. 1988.
- La Forêt de métal (Hurtubise HMH, Plus, 1991)
  - Republished with same title for France market (Gamma jeunesse, 1994)
  - Republished with same title for France market (L'Élan vert, 1998)
- Par chemins inventés (Collectif, Québec/Amérique, Clip 10, 1992)
- Télé-rencontre (Hurtubise HMH, Plus, 1999)

==== Jeunesse-pop books ====
- Le Rendez-vous du désert. Jeunesse-pop #59. Paulines. 1987.
- Mort sur le Redan. Jeunesse-pop #64. Paulines. 1988.
- Le Crime de l'Enchanteresse. Jeunesse-pop #66. Paulines. 1989. ISBN 2890396533.
- Monsieur Bizarre. Jeunesse-pop #70. Paulines. 1990.
- Des vacances bizarres. Jeunesse-pop #74. Paulines. 1991. ISBN 2890395022.
- Le Septième Écran (Paulines, Jeunesse-pop 80, 1992)
- La Saison de l'exil (Paulines, Jeunesse-pop 82, 1992)
- La Bizarre Aventure. Jeunesse-pop #86 (in French). Paulines. 1993. ISBN 2-89039-587-1.
- La Planète du mensonge (Paulines, Jeunesse-pop 89, 1993)
- Le Cadavre dans la glissoire. Jeunesse-pop #92. Montreal: Paulines. 1994. ISBN 2-89420-219-9.
- Une nuit bizarre (Médiaspaul, Jeunesse-pop 92, 1994)
- Le Fantôme de l'opérateur. Jeunesse-pop 109. Médiaspaul. 1996. ISBN 2-89420-331-4.
- Cher ancêtre. Jeunesse-pop #115. Médiaspaul. 1996. ISBN 2-89420-357-8.
- Damien mort ou vif. Jeunesse-pop #119. Montreal: Médiaspaul. 1997. ISBN 2-89420-084-6. (sequel to Cher ancêtre)
- Une enquête de J.-P. Jeunesse-Pop. Médiaspaul. 1998. ISBN 2-89420-124-9.
- Les Eaux de Jade. Jeunesse-pop #134. Montreal: Médiaspaul. 2000. ISBN 2-89420-404-3.
- Le Crime de Culdéric. Jeunesse-pop #141. Montreal: Médiaspaul. 2001. ISBN 2-89420-458-2.

=== Science fiction ===
- Trilogie Le Sable et l'Acier
  - Volume 1: Nelle de Vilvèq (Alire, Romans 011, 1997)
  - Volume 2: Samiva de Frée (Alire, Romans 016, 1998)
  - Volume 3: Issabel de Qohosaten (Alire, Romans 020, 1998)
- Les Jours de l'ombre (Alire, Romans 075, 2004).
- Un tour en Arkadie (Alire, Romans 125, 2009)

=== Other stories ===
- Le Retour des gueux (Pour ta belle gueule d'ahuri 6, 1983)
- "La Traversée d'Algir". Imagine... 20. 1984.
- "De silence et d'absence". Solaris. 56. 1984.
- "La Volière". Imagine... 24. 1984.
- La Voyageuse (Moebius 23, 1984)
- Le Seuil d'Ashoran (Imagine... 27, 1985)
- La Rébellion de Toby Arden (in Aurores Boréales 2, Le Préambule, Chroniques du futur 9, 1985)
- Interférences (Pandore 2, 1985)
- "Instant". Dix nouvelles de science-fiction québécoise. Quinze. 1985.
- "L'Enfant d'Asterman". Planéria. Conquêtes. Tisseyre. 1985.
- La Migratrice (Solaris 63, 1985)
  - English version: The Mother Migrator (in TesseractsQ, Tesseract Books, 1996)
- Cher Ancêtre (Imagine... 39, 1987)
- "En bout de ligne". Solaris. 73. 1987.
- Le Château de fer (Faërie/Mondes imaginaires 1, 1988)
- La Petite (Imagine... 46, 1988)
  - English version: Guinea Pig (in Tesseracts 3, Press Porcépic, 1990)
- "Le Tiers de l'avenir". C.I.N.Q. Autres mers, autres mondes #4. Logiques. 1989.
- Tu verras (Imagine... 48, 1989)
- Eaux mortes, eaux vives (Solaris 87, 1989)
- "Les Noms de l'oubli". Sous des soleils étrangers. Publications Ianus. 1989.
- DernièrePhase (Arcade 18, 1989)
- Promenons-nous dans les bois (Le Sabord 25, 1990)
- Cocon en sous-location (XYZ 22, 1990)
- Voyage à Paris (Samizdat 17, 1990)
- La Collection Galloway (Solaris 101, 1992)
- Cloche vaine (Solaris 109, 1994)
  - Reparution dans Escales sur Solaris (Vents d'Ouest, Rafales, 1995)
  - Version anglaise: Empty Ring (in Tesseracts 5, Tesseract Books, 1996)
- Les Radis de la colère (in Le Bal des ombres, Québec/Amérique, Clip 17, 1994)
- Adieu Arkadie (Samizdat 25, 1994)
- La Fin de la journée (in Fou Rire, Ashem Fictions, 1995)
- Navices (collaboration avec Yves Meynard) (Solaris 115, 1995)
- "La Maison douleur". La Maison douleur et autres histoires de peur. Vents d'Ouest. 1996.
- Retour sur Arkadie (in Concerto pour six voix, Médiaspaul, Jeunesse-pop 121, 1997)
- Sans titre (in Roberval fantastique, Ashem fictions, 1998)
- "Un lit de caillou". Solaris. 140. 2002.

=== Chapters and essays ===
- "Writing Women's Stories in a Male Universe: Reflections on Women and Science Fiction". Out of This World: Canadian Science Fiction & Fantasy Literature. National Library of Canada, in cooperation with Quarry Press. 1995.

== Awards and recognition ==
- 1981: Prix Boréal, Concours "Écriture sur place" for Le Retour des gueux
- 1983: Prix Boréal, Concours "Écriture sur place" for La Traversée d'Algir
- 1988: Grand Prix de la science-fiction et du fantastique québécois (Quebec science fiction and fantary award) for La Petite Fille du silence
- 1988: Prix Boréal for Le Temps des migrations
- 1992: Award "Artiste jeune carrière" (young career artist) from City of Laval
- 1999: Grand Prix de la science-fiction et du fantastique québécois (Quebec science fiction and fantary award) for Samiva de Frée et Issabel de Qohosaten
- 1999: Prix Boréal for Samiva de Frée
- 2024 Prix Aurora/Boréal, Meilleur Ouvrage Connexe (Best Related Work), for Solaris 225–228.
