= Jovette Bernier =

Jovette-Alice Bernier
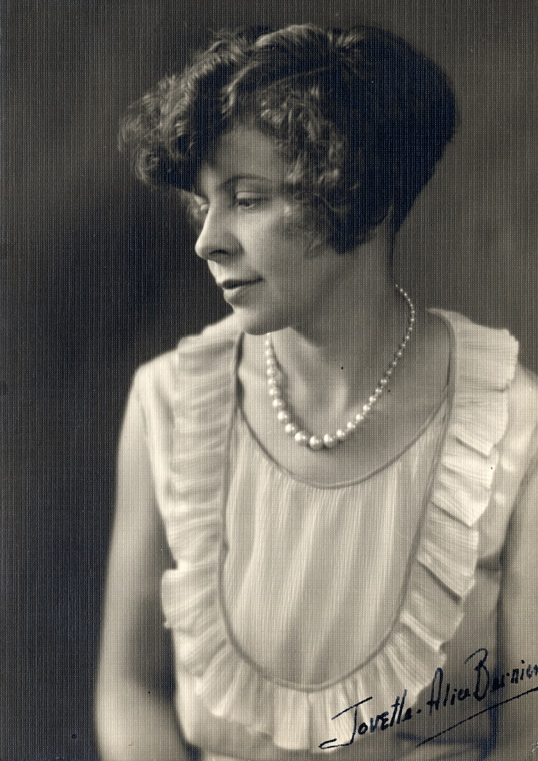
- Born: November 27, 1900; Saint-Fabien, Quebec
- Died: December 4, 1981 (aged 81); Longueuil, Quebec
- Occupations: writer journalist

Marie-Angèle "Jovette" Alice Bernier (November 27, 1900 – December 4, 1981) was a journalist and writer in Quebec. Because of extensive exposure in the print media and on radio, she was often referred to simply as Jovette.

== Biography ==
The daughter of Joseph-Elzéar Bernier and Élise Morest, she was born in Saint-Fabien-de-Rimouski. She attended the Normal School in Rimouski and went on to teach in the Gaspé region and later Quebec City. Bernier began her career in journalism in 1923 and, over the next 50 years, appeared in print, on radio and on television. She wrote for L'Événement in Quebec city, La Tribune in Sherbrooke and L'Illustration in Montreal. In 1932, she was given a daily show titled Bonjour madame on radio station CKAC. From 1939 to 1958, Bernier was the host of the radio show Quelles nouvelles , which included sketch comedy. From 1963 to 1965, she wrote scripts for the Quebec soap opera Rue de l'Anse.

== Bibliography ==
Poetry collections

- Roulades (1924)
- Comme l'oiseau (1926)
- Tout n'est pas dit (1929), which won the Lieutenant-Governor's medal
- les Masques déchirés (1932)
- Mon deuil en rouge (1945)

Novels

- La chair décevante (1931). La chair décevante from 1931 was seen as scandalously sensual when it was first published. The protagonist is Didi, a young single mother (a social status that was not widely accepted at the time.) The book opens with Didi on vacation at a beach. She meets a man named Jean, and the book describes her appreciating his body with a frankness and explicitness that would be seen as shocking for the time.
- Non Monsieur (1969), which received the Prix du Cercle du livre de France. Non Monsieur from 1969 describes Puce ("Flea"), a woman set apart from traditional society. She is a teacher, who falls madly in love with a Metis man named Noc. As summarized by Ouellet, Beaulieu, and Tremblay, she is acting less for her own liberation as a woman and more as an act of rebellion against her family.

== Death and legacy ==
Bernier died in Longueuil at the age of 81.

Rue Jovette-Bernier in Sherbrooke, Rue Jovette-Bernier in Montreal and Rue Jovette-Bernier in Quebec City were named in her honour.

An annual literary prize, the Prix Jovette-Bernier (later known as the Prix Jovette-Bernier—Ville de Rimouski), was created in her honour.

== Awards ==
- Lieutenant-Governor's medal
- Prix du Cercle du livre de France
