= Yvette Naubert =

Canadian writer and playwright

Yvette Naubert (September 19, 1918 – December 1, 1982) was a Canadian writer and playwright.

The daughter of Jean-Marie Naubert and Theodora D'Aoust, she was born in Hull and received a Bachelor of Music from the École de musique Vincent-d'Indy in Montreal. From 1946 to 1952, she wrote drama for Radio Canada. After spending some time in the United States, Naubert produced a number of novels:

- La dormeuse éveillée (1965)
- Contes de la solitude (1967)
- L'été de la cigale (1968), which received the Prix du Cercle du livre de France and the Prix David
- Les Pierrefendre (1972)

She was writer in residence at the University of Ottawa in 1980.

Naubert died in Ottawa at the age of 64.

Île Yvette-Naubert, a small island in the Ottawa River near the Val-Tétreau neighbourhood of Gatineau, was named in her honour. Avenue Yvette-Naubert in Montreal also takes its name from her.
