= Sainte-Foy–Sillery–Cap-Rouge =

- Borough
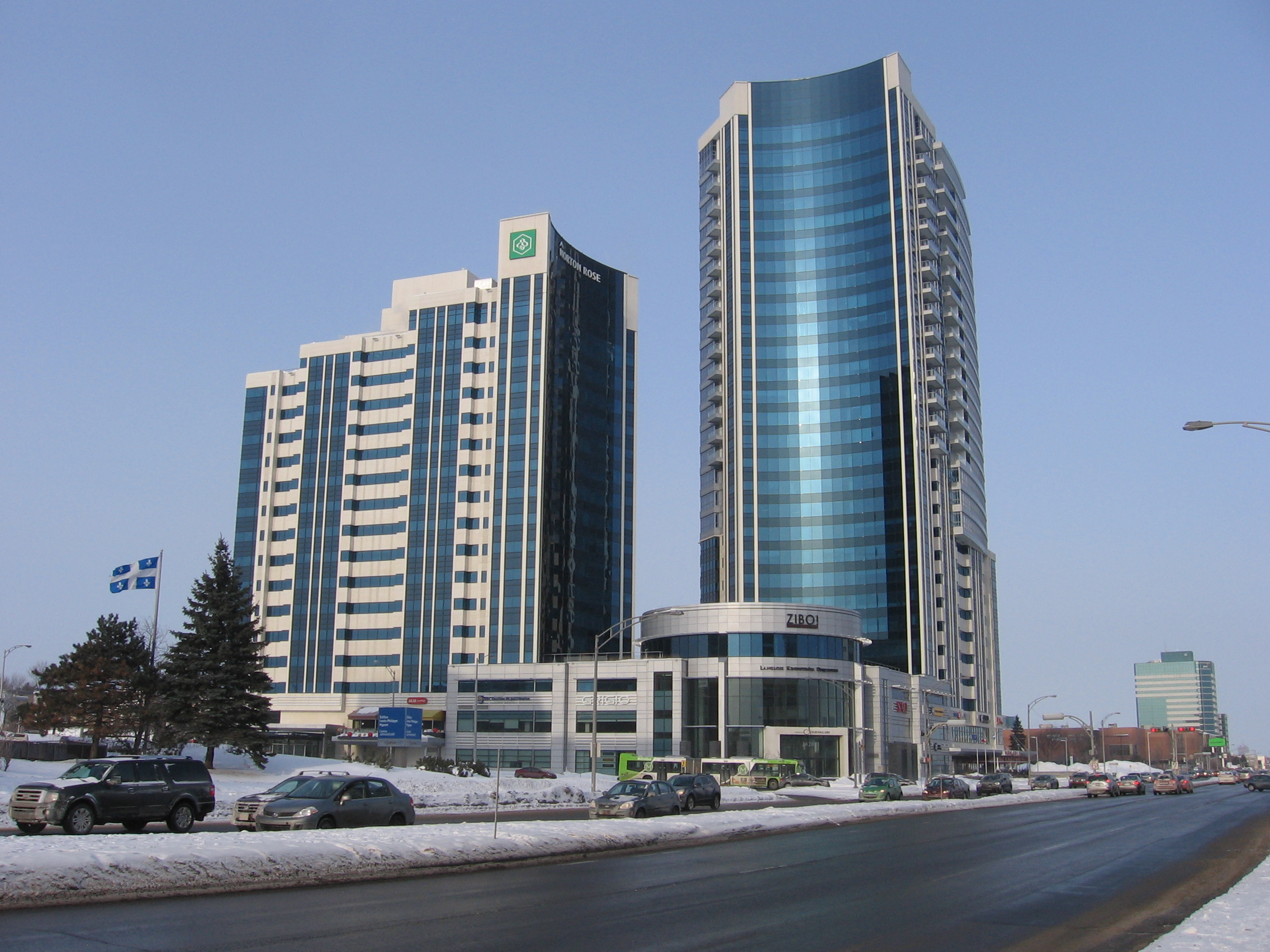
- Complex Jules Dallaire

- Quebec City
- Coordinates: 46°46′0″N 71°18′30″W
- Country: Canada
- Province: Quebec
- Region: Capitale-Nationale
- Effective: 1 January 2002

Government
  - Borough mayor: Jean-Luc Lavoie
- Time zone: UTC−05:00 (EST)
  - Summer (DST): UTC−04:00 (EDT)
- Postal code(s): G
- Area codes: 418 and 581
- Website: Official website

Sainte-Foy–Sillery–Cap-Rouge (French pronunciation: [sɛ̃t fwa silʁi kap ʁuʒ]) is a borough of Quebec City, Quebec, Canada.

The borough was created on November 1, 2009, from the former borough of Sainte-Foy–Sillery and part of the former borough of Laurentien. Those boroughs in turn had been created on January 1, 2002; on that date, the former city of Cap-Rouge, a small part of the former city of Sainte-Foy, and other territory went into Laurentien, while the former city of Sillery and the rest of Sainte-Foy formed Sainte-Foy–Sillery.

== Education ==
- Cégep de Ste-Foy
- Cégep Garneau
- Collège de Champigny
- École nationale d'administration publique
- Université Laval

== See also ==
- Municipal reorganization in Quebec
- Louis-Hébert (federal electoral district)
- Jean-Talon
