= Bertrand Vac =

- Born: Aimé Pelletier; August 20, 1914; Saint-Ambroise-de-Kildare, Quebec
- Died: July 23, 2010 (aged 95); Montreal, Quebec
- Occupations: surgeon, writer
- Writing career
- Subject: Quote: "Cynicism saves you a lot of time." - Mes pensées "profondes" (1967)

Bertrand Vac was the pen name of Quebec novelist and surgeon Aimé Pelletier (August 20, 1914 – July 23, 2010). Aimé Pelletier, writing as Bertrand Vac, developed a literary career while working for over fifty years at the Verdun General Hospital as a surgeon and, in semi-retirement, as a surgical assistant. His literary activities were initially hidden from his medical colleagues.

== Early life and education ==
Pelletier was born the eighth of ten children to the local surgeon at Saint-Ambroise-de-Kildare, Quebec. The family later relocated to Joliette, Quebec. Pelletier, originally wishing to become an architect, was persuaded to become a doctor by his father. Pelletier graduated from the Laval University medical school in 1939.(Pelletier's obituary at the Union des Écrivaines et Écrivains Québecois states that he graduated from the Université de Montréal medical school, rather than the Université Laval.)

== Career ==
Pelletier volunteered for service during the Second World War, and was with the medical corps both during the war and until 1946. He worked in field hospitals behind the front lines in France, particularly during the Battle of Normandy, when he arrived in France as part of the Normandy Invasion.

Pelletier's pen name was developed in France. After the war, Pelletier chose to study surgery in Paris, where his colleagues preferred to call him "Bernard", rather than "Aimé". Vac was chosen as his literary surname because it represented the Hindu God of Speech.

Pelletier wrote fourteen books during a sixty-year literary career, primarily with publisher Le cercle du livre de France, later known Les Éditions Pierre Tisseyre. He won the Prix du Cercle du livre de France on three occasions. Pelletier is believed to be the first Quebec writer to publish a detective novel (L'assassin dans l'hôpital, 1956). As Bertrand Vac, Pelletier has been the subject of academic commentary and analysis.

Pelletier wrote Louise Genest in 1950 and a satirical story Saint-Pépin, P.Q. in 1955. The themes of adultery in his early works were groundbreaking at that particular time in the history of Quebec literature. Many of his works are particularly referenced to Montreal's Golden Square Mile, where Pelletier lived for over half a century. None of his works have been translated from the original French.

Pelletier died in Montreal; his ashes are interred at his ancestral cemetery, located in Sainte-Mélanie, Quebec.

== Bibliography ==
=== Original works ===
- 2008 Que le diable m'emporte (memoir)
- 1998 À mon seul désir (with a focus on the society of Saint-Gabriel-de-Brandon, Quebec).
- 1992 Les voluptueuses
- 1991 Rue de Bullion
- 1988 Bizarres(Commentary)
- 1974 Le carrefour des géants, Montréal 1820-1885 (non-fiction essay)
- 1967 Mes pensées "profondes" {book of aphorisms)
- 1965 Histoires galantes
- 1963 La favorite et le conquérant
- 1956 L'assassin dans l'hôpital(Considered to be the first detective novel published by a Quebec writer.)
- 1955 Saint-Pépin, P.Q.(A satire concerning the rural bourgeois and political corruption, referenced to Joliette, Quebec)
- 1952 Deux portes ... une addresse (The story of a soldier returning to a domestic life in Canada that he finds boring, compared to his love affair with a woman in France.)
- 1950 Louise Genest (The story of a rural homemaker who escapes an abusive husband and falls in love with a Métis man.)

=== Anthology ===
- 1989 Le Choix de Bertrand Vac dans son œuvre

=== Other ===
- 1987 Jean C. Lallemand raconte: Memoirs of an industrialist, philanthropist and music patron, with the collaboration of Bertrand Vac. Jean Clovis Lallemand (1898-1987) was one of the founders of the Montreal Symphony Orchestra, who also established prizes for musical composition and was a lifelong financial patron of classical music, particularly in Montreal and area. He was admitted to membership in the Order of Canada in 1968.
- 1967 Appelez-moi Amédée Unpublished play.

== See also ==
- French Wikipedia profile of Bertrand Vac
