= Louise Maheux-Forcier =

Canadian writer

- Born: June 9, 1929; Montreal, Quebec
- Died: February 5, 2015 (aged 85)
- Occupations: Novelist, radio and television drama writer
- Writing career
- Period: 1960s-present
- Notable works: Amadou, Une Forêt pour Zoé

Louise Maheux-Forcier (June 9, 1929 – February 5, 2015) was a Quebec author.

She was born in Montreal and was educated at the École supérieure Sainte-Croix and then went on to study music at the Conservatoire de musique et d'art dramatique du Québec. From 1952 to 1954, she studied piano with Yves Nat in Paris. Beginning in 1959, however, she decided to concentrate on writing. Her first novel Amadou, published in 1963, explored the then-taboo subject of lesbianism. The novel was awarded the Prix du Cercle du livre de France.

Other novels followed:

- L'Île joyeuse (1965) translated as Isle of Joy (1987)
- Une Forêt pour Zoé (1969), received the Governor General's Award for French-language fiction
- Paroles et musique (1973)
- Appassionata (1978)

She produced a collection of short stories, En toutes lettres (1980), She wrote a number of dramas that were broadcast on the radio and on television by Radio Canada. Her teleplay Ariosa was rejected by Radio-Canada in 1973 because of its lesbian themes, but was eventually produced and aired by the network in 1982.

In 1974, she was named writer in residence at the University of Ottawa. She was admitted to the Académie des lettres du Québec in 1982. In 1985, she was named to the Royal Society of Canada. In 1986, she was admitted to the Order of Canada.

== Translation ==
- in German, transl. Yvonne Petter-Zimmer: Verschwiegenheit, in: Frauen in Kanada. Erzählungen und Gedichte. dtv, Munich 1993 (La discretion, in: En toutes lettres. Editions Pierre Tiseyre, 1980)
