= Pierre Tisseyre =

Canadian journalist and writer

Pierre Tisseyre, OC (May 5, 1909 – March 3, 1995) was a Canadian lawyer, journalist, writer, and literary editor in Quebec.

He was born in Paris and studied law there. At the age of 22, he was hired as legal counsel by Paramount Pictures in Europe, specializing in authors' rights. Tisseyre moved to New York City in 1935, where he was correspondent for several French magazines and newspapers. He returned to Europe to join the army in 1940 and was captured by the Germans later that year. Tisseyre spent the rest of World War II in prison camps in Poland and Czechoslovakia. He wrote 55 heures de guerre based on his experiences; the book was awarded the Prix Cazes in 1944.

After the war, Tisseyre moved to Montreal. In 1947, he married the journalist Michelle Ahern. He became an editor for the Canadian editions of several French publications. In 1948, Tisseyre became the director of the Montreal office for Le Cercle du livre de France. In 1949, he established the literary prize Prix du Cercle du livre de France.

He was a member of the Association des éditeurs canadiens, serving several terms as president. Tisseyre founded several other Quebec publishing houses: Le Cercle du livre romanesque in 1952, Les Messageries du Saint-Laurent in 1960, Les Éditions du Renouveau pédagogique in 1965 and Les Éditions Mirabel in 1971. In 1973, he launched the Two solitudes collection, which consisted of works by English Canadian authors translated into French. In 1987, Le Cercle du livre de France was renamed Éditions Pierre Tisseyre. His son Charles Tisseyre became a television journalist and host of the science and technology series Découverte.
