= Diane Giguère =

Canadian writer living in Quebec (born 1937)

Diane Giguère (born December 6, 1937) is a Canadian writer living in Quebec.

== Biography ==
The daughter of Louis Giguère, Canadian senator, and Carmen Harvey, she was born in Montreal; her grandfather was the novelist Jean-Charles Harvey. She was educated at the Collège International Marie de France and the Conservatoire de musique et d'art dramatique du Québec. From 1956 to 1958, she performed as a comedian on stage and on television. She subsequently became a presenter for Radio Canada, where she hosted music broadcasts; she also worked as a researcher and editor for religious programming.

Her 1961 novel Le Temps des jeux, which explores a troubled relationship between mother and daughter, received the Prix du Cercle du livre de France. It was followed by the 1965 novel L'eau est profonde which was awarded the same prize. In 1993, she published the novel L'abandon.

English translations of her novels are:

- Innocence (1962) from Le Temps des jeux
- Wings in the Wind (1979) from Dans les ailes du vent (1976)

== Awards ==
- the Prix du Cercle du livre de France in 1961 and 1965
- the Prix France-Québec in 1976 for Dans les ailes du vent
- a Guggenheim Fellowship in 1969
