= Lise Blouin =

Canadian writer

Lise Blouin (born September 11, 1944) is a Quebec educator and novelist.

== Biography ==
She was born in Saint-Isidore-d'Auckland in Quebec's Eastern Townships and studied at the Université de Sherbrooke, receiving a BEd and a BA.

Blouin worked as an adult education teacher while pursuing her writing career.

She received the Prix littéraire Esso du Cercle du livre de France for her novel Miroir à deux visages, published in 1981. In 1993, she received the Prix Gaston-Gouin for L'absente. Her novel L'Or des fous received both the Prix Alfred-Desrochers in 2004 and the Prix du roman d'amour Prince-Maurice in 2005.

Blouin also has written a number of educational works, mainly for adult students.
