= Jocelyne Blouin =

Canadian meteorologist (1950–2019)

- Born: 17 October 1950
- Died: 27 May 2019; Longueuil
- Education: M.Sc. meteorology from Université du Québec à Montréal
- Occupation: Meteorologist
- Employers: Canadian Broadcasting Corporation (1978–2011); Environment and Climate Change Canada (1974–1980)

Jocelyne Blouin (17 October 1950 – 27 May 2019) was a Québécoise meteorologist and weather presenter. She worked for Canadian French-language public broadcaster Société Radio-Canada from 1978 to 2011, where she was known for her regular weather bulletins on the news.

== Biography ==
=== Education ===
Born 17 October 1950, Jocelyne Blouin obtained an honours degree in physics from the Université du Québec à Montréal (UQAM) in 1973. She was then hired by Environment Canada and followed the Operational Weather Training Course. She obtained a certificate in meteorology from UQAM in 1974. Blouin completed the academic part of a master's degree in meteorology in 1986.

=== Career ===
Blouin's first position with the Meteorological Service of Canada (MSC) was in 1974 in Edmonton, Alberta. During these early years, she taught Sea Scout weather courses and participated in the morning broadcast of CHFA Radio-Canada.

In 1976 the MSC repatriated her to Montreal. In 1978 Radio-Canada Television offered her a part-time position as a weather presenter. She resigned from the MSC in July 1980 to devote herself full-time to this new job.

In September 2005 Radio-Canada removed Blouin from the camera due to a "period of transition and testing". Several complaints were lodged in this respect and Blouin returned to her position the following week.

In June 2011 Blouin announced her departure from Le Téléjournal to retire after 33 years with Radio-Canada. She was replaced by Pascal Yiacouvakis. Over the course of her career, she presented nearly 15,000 weather bulletins.

On 12 July 2016, Blouin and Jean-Charles Beaubois, the former director of Belgian Radio-Television's weather department, launched the Blisly app. This smartphone program offers personalized health risk indexes from aggravating weather factors and is designed to help people suffering from non-food allergies, joint pain, respiratory or heart problems, or migraines.

Jocelyne Blouin died from cancer on 27 May 2019.

== Honours ==
Jocelyne Blouin was the recipient of many national and international awards. In 1993 she received the Alcide-Ouellet Award, named after a Canadian meteorologist. At the International Weather Festival, she received the Best Weather and Environment Report in 1999, the 2000 Scientists Award, and the Best Weather and Environment Report in 2002.
