= Sainte-Foy–Sillery =

Boroughs of Quebec City prior to October 31, 2009.

Current boroughs of Quebec City as of November 1.

Sainte-Foy–Sillery (French pronunciation: [sɛ̃t fwa silʁi]) is a former borough of Quebec City (Population (2006): 72,262). It comprised the former city of Sillery and most of Sainte-Foy, which were incorporated into the borough on January 1, 2002.

On November 1, 2009, the new borough of Sainte-Foy–Sillery–Cap-Rouge was created, including the area of the former city of Cap-Rouge and the part of Sainte-Foy that had not been incorporated earlier into the former borough; these had been incorporated into the borough of Laurentien in 2002. In the 2009 reorganization, Laurentien was dismembered and ceased to exist.

== See also ==
- 2000–06 municipal reorganization in Quebec
