= Éditions Pierre Tisseyre =

Éditions Pierre Tisseyre (founded in 1947 under the name Le Cercle du livre de France) is a Quebec publishing house. It played a major role in the history of Quebec publishing.

In 1946, two Americans Horace Marston and Charles Spilka created Le Cercle du livre de France in New York City. It was originally established to provide French books for French-speaking wives of American soldiers who had returned from World War II. From 1948 to 1964, Pierre Tisseyre worked as literary director for the company, choosing which books to publish; he also negotiated the right to publish Canadian French books. In 1949, he established a literary prize Prix du Cercle du livre de France. In 1964, Marston gave control of the Canadian part of the business to Tisseyre, who became sole owner in 1967. In 1987, the company was renamed Éditions Pierre Tisseyre.

The company was later managed by his sons François Tisseyre and then Charles Tisseyre. Its books are now targeted more towards young and adolescent readers.
