= Prix du Cercle du livre de France =

The Prix du Cercle du livre de France is a literary prize created by the Quebec publishing house Le Cercle du livre de France with the aim of promoting Quebec authors. From 1977 to 1985, the prize was offered by Esso Canada and was renamed Prix littéraire Esso du Cercle du livre de France.

== Prize recipients ==
- 1950 - Bertrand Vac - Louise Genest
- 1951 - André Langevin - Évadé de la nuit
- 1952 - Bertrand Vac - Deux portes, une adresse
- 1953 - André Langevin - Poussière sur la ville
- 1954 - Jean Vaillancourt - Les Canadiens errants
- 1955 - Jean Filiatrault - Chaînes
- 1956
  - Maurice Gagnon - L'Échéance
  - Eugène Cloutier - Les Inutiles
  - Jean Simard - Mon fils pourtant heureux...
- 1957 - Jean-Marie Poirier - Le Prix du souvenir
- 1958 - Claire Martin - Avec ou sans amour
- 1959 - Pierre Gélinas - Les Vivants, les morts et les autres
- 1960 - Claude Jasmin - La Corde au cou
- 1961 - Diane Giguère - Le Temps des jeux
- 1962 - No recipient
- 1963 - Louise Maheux-Forcier - Amadou
- 1964 - Georges Cartier - Le Poisson pêché
- 1965 - Bertrand Vac - Histoires galantes
- 1966 - André Berthiaume - La Fugue
- 1967 - Anne Bertrand - Cancer
- 1968 - Yvette Naubert - L'Été de la cigale
- 1969 - Jovette Bernier - Non monsieur
- 1970 - No recipient
- 1971 - Lise Parent - Les Îles flottantes
- 1972 - No recipient
- 1973 - Huguette Légaré - La Conversation entre hommes
- 1974 - Jean-Pierre Guay - Mise en liberté
- 1975 - Pierre Stewart - L'Amour d'une autre
- 1976 - No recipient
- 1977 - Simone Piuze - Les Cercles concentriques
- 1978 - Négovan Rajic - Les Hommes-taupes
- 1979 - Normand Rousseau - Les Jardins secrets
- 1980 - Françoise Dumoulin-Tessier - Le Salon vert
- 1981 - Lise Blouin - Miroir à deux visages
- 1982 - Josette Labbé - Jean-Pierre, mon homme, ma mère
- 1983 - Jean-François Somcynsky - La Frontière du milieu
- 1984 - Gilbert Choquette - La Forge et la flamme
- 1985 - Alexander Lahaye - Opération Bernhard II
