= Maizerets =

Coordinates: 46°50′15″N 71°12′44″W

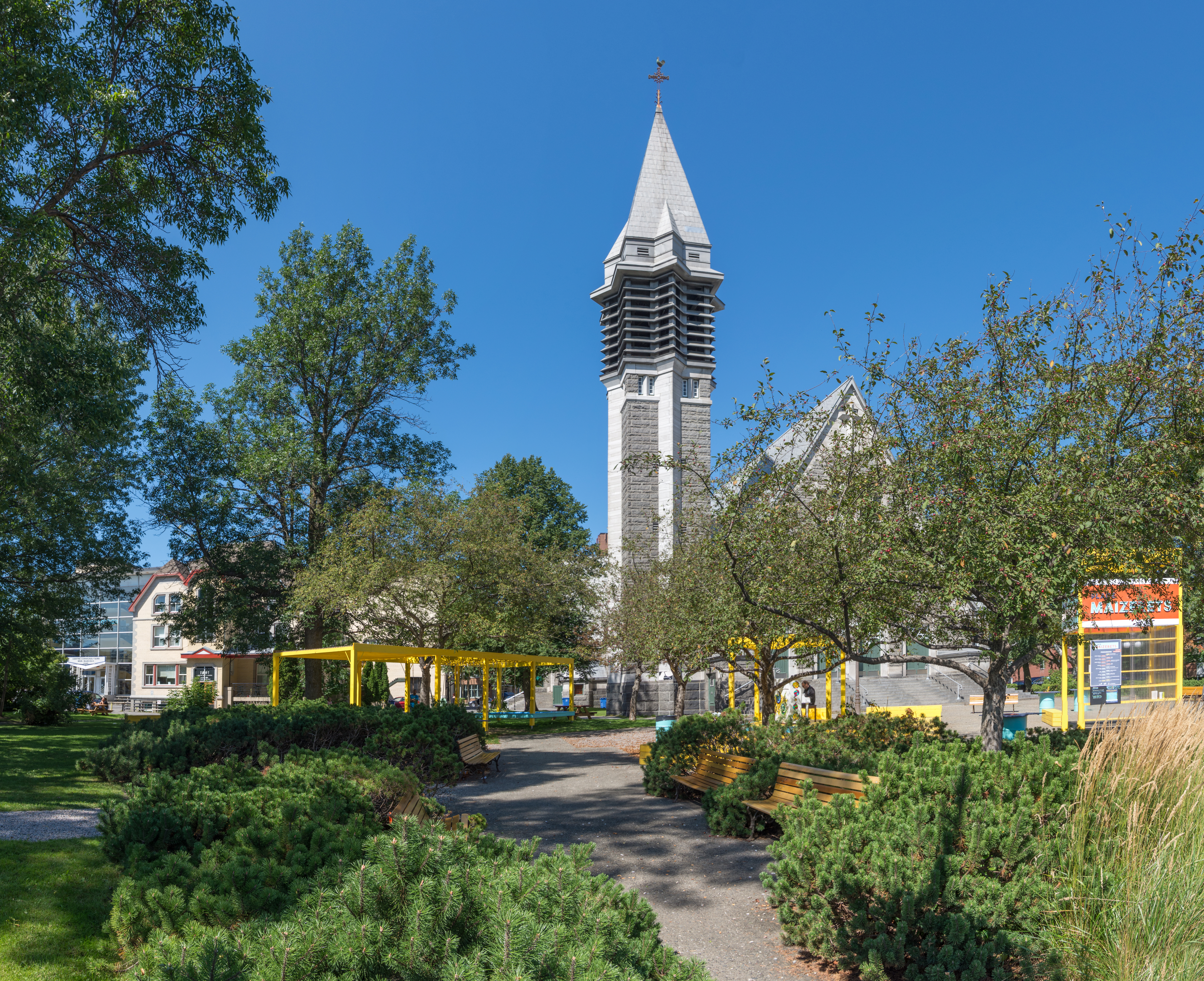
Church in Québec ville, Québec, Cánada

Maizerets (French pronunciation: [mɛzʁɛ]) is a neighbourhood of the la Cité-Limoilou borough of Quebec City, Quebec, Canada that had a population of 14 700 in 2011.

== Domaine de Maizerets ==
Le Domaine de Maizerets is a 27-hectare park owned by the Commission de la Capitale Nationale du Québec. The park is operated and maintained by the Société du domaine Maizerets, a non-profit organization that was mandated to that effect.

The park offers 11 kilometers of walking trails. Bird watchers and locals frequently visit the park for its beautiful oasis of nature, which is located inside an urban area. The park features an arboretum which was created in 1997 and replaces a vacant lot formerly used as a snow dumping site in the winter. The Arboretum has been recognized as one of the province of Québec's 20 most beautiful gardens.

In winter, the park is accessible for skiers and offers ice skating and trails for snowshoeing.

The park has several buildings, one of which is the Château Ango des Maizerets, an 18th-century mansion built by the French, as well as a modern observation tower overlooking the Saint Lawrence River.

The stone barn and the Château are two of the oldest buildings in the borough, and both are classified as patrimonial heritage by the City of Québec.

Access to the park is free and is regulated by the Quebec City by-laws.

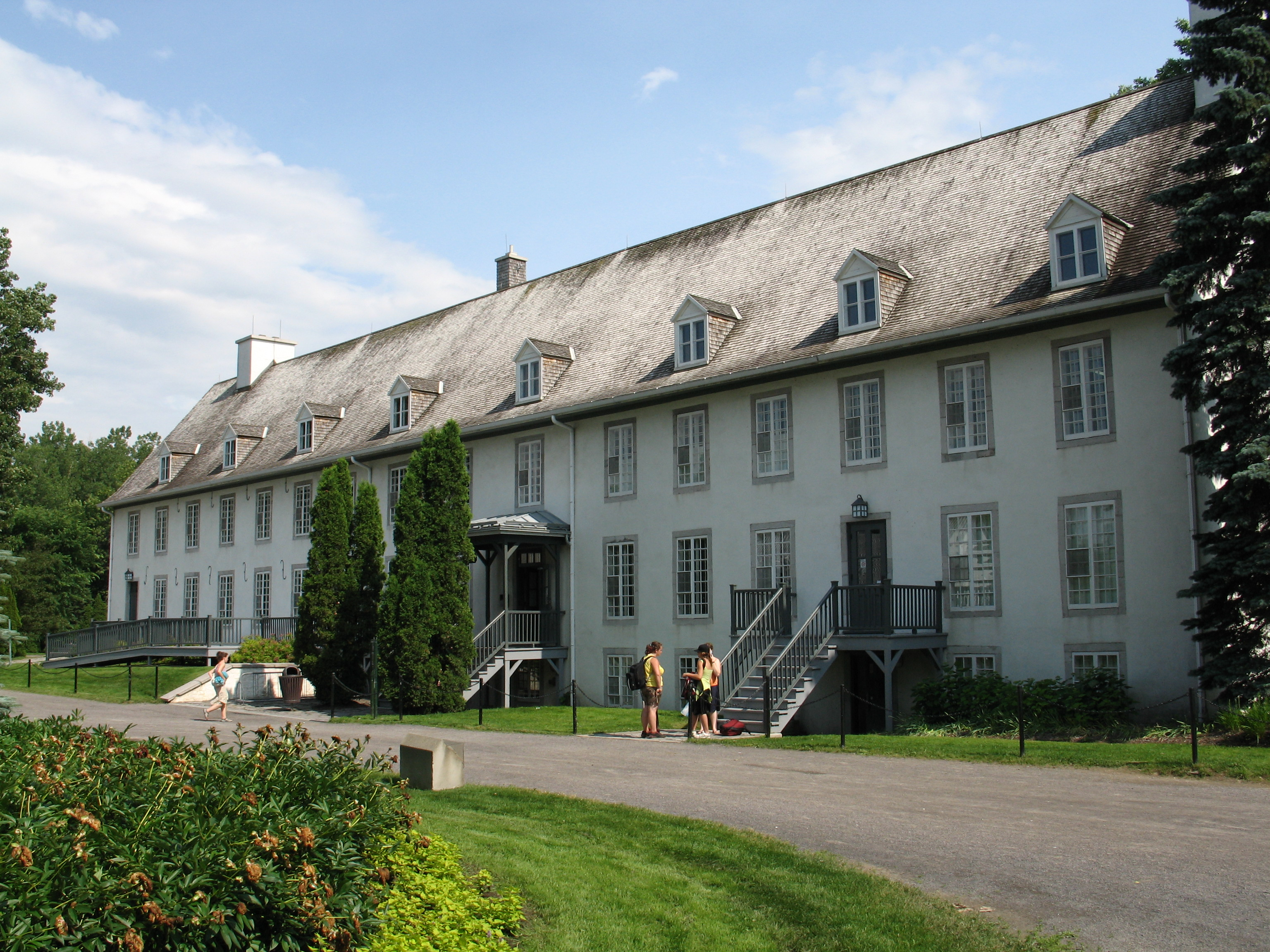
Château Ango, the mansion of the domain

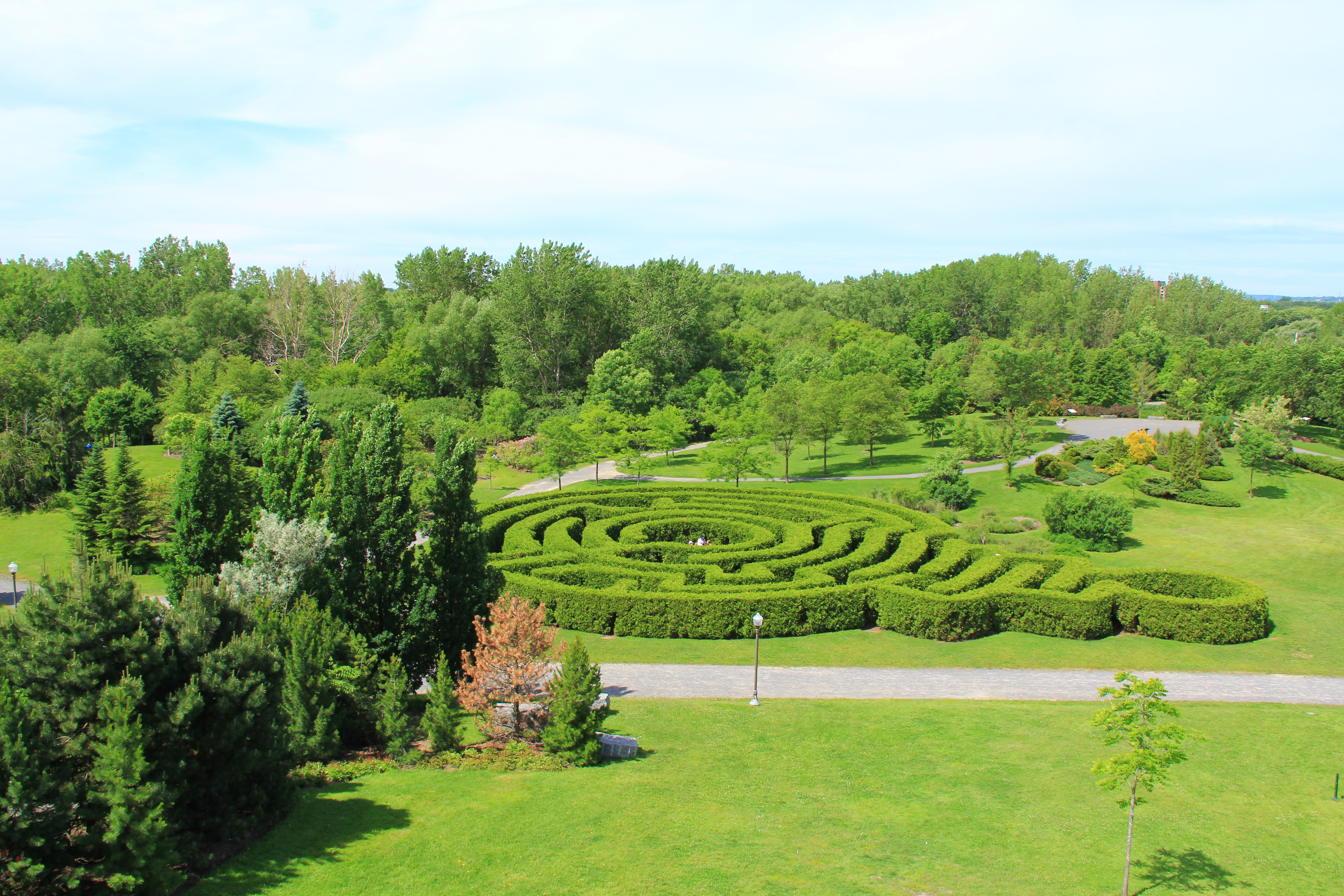
The arboretum and the garden maze

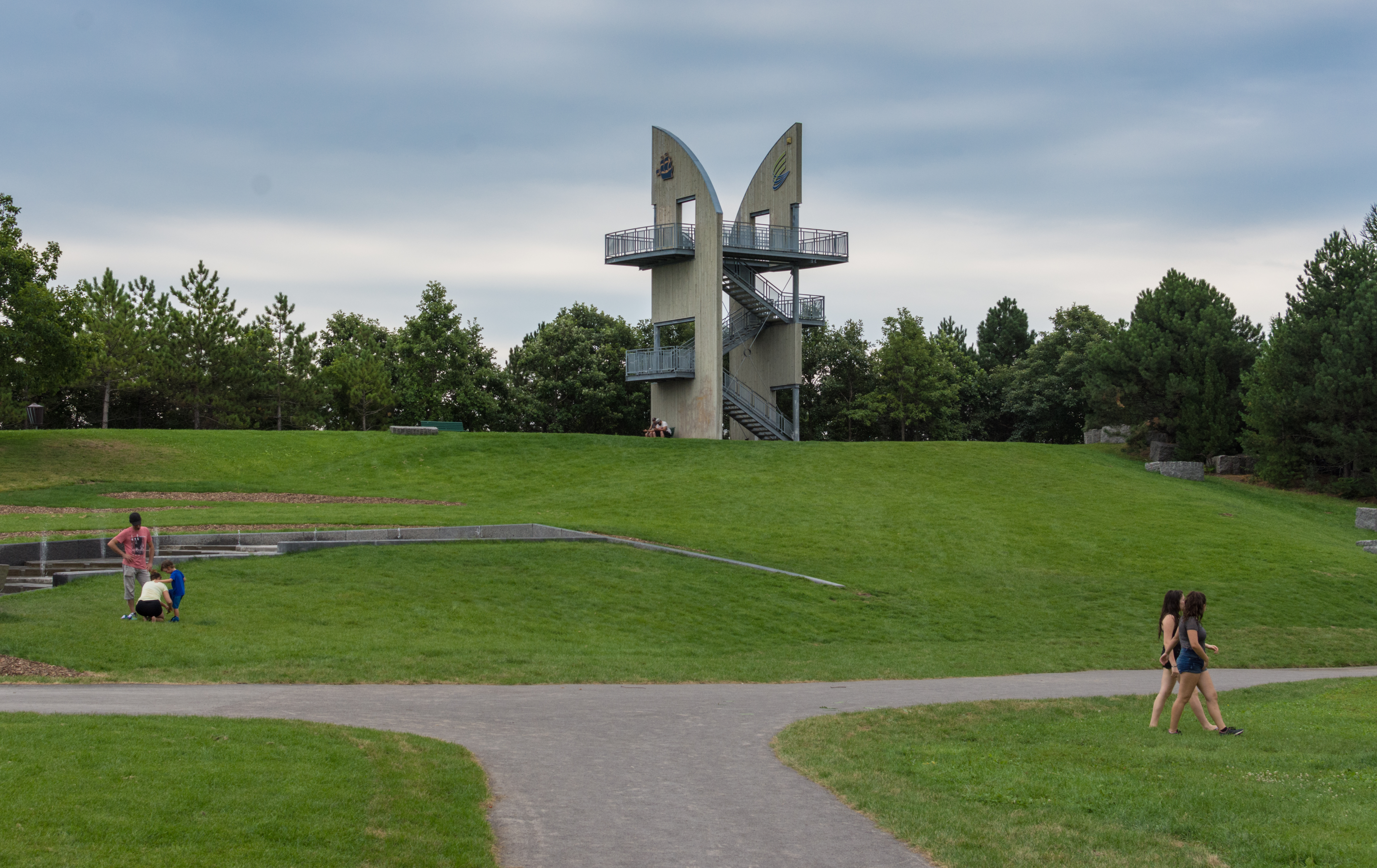
The Observation tower

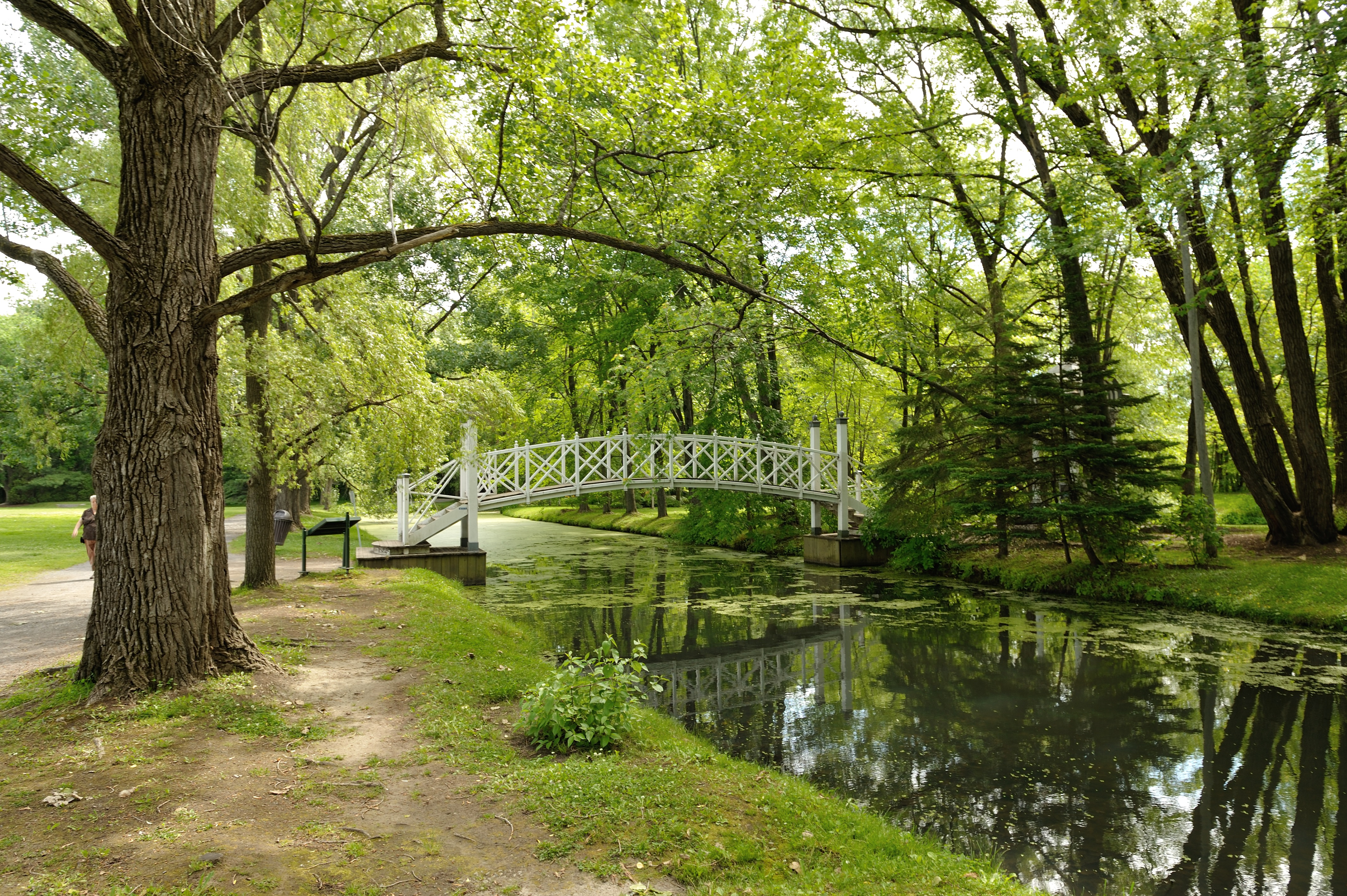
A bridge on the Du Moulin river

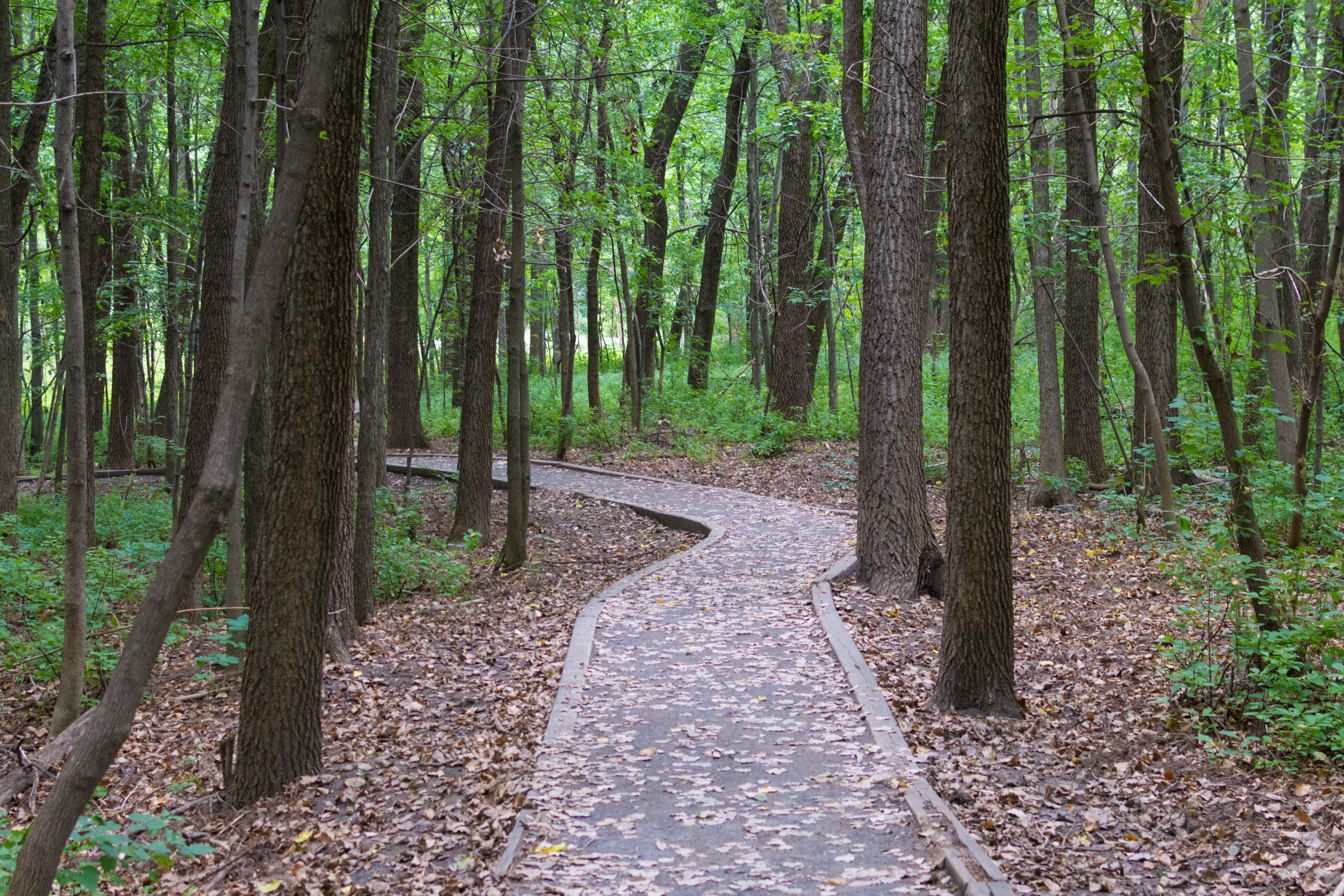
A path
