= La Cité-Limoilou =

Coordinates: 46.8219°N 71.2372°W

- Borough of Quebec City
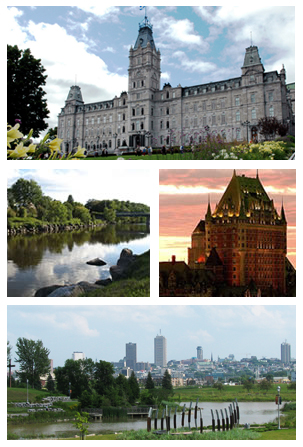
- Various scenes from La Cité-Limoilou.

- Location of La Cité-Limoilou in Quebec City.
- Country: Canada
- Province: Quebec
- Region: Capitale-Nationale
- Established: November 1, 2009

Government
  - Type: Borough

Area
  - Total: 22.18 km^{2} (8.56 sq mi)

Population (2021)
  - Total: 108,415
  - Density: 4,888/km^{2} (12,660/sq mi)
- Time zone: UTC-5 (EST)
  - Summer (DST): UTC-4 (EDT)
- Area code: Area code 418
- Website: ville.quebec.qc.ca/

La Cité-Limoilou (French pronunciation: [la site limwalu]) is the central borough of Quebec City, the oldest (in terms of architecture), and the most populous, comprising 19.73% of the city's total population. As an administrative division, it is very new, having only been formed on November 1, 2009, from the former boroughs of La Cité and Limoilou.

== Districts ==
The borough is composed of nine districts, six formerly part of La Cité and three formerly part of Limoilou:

La Cité

- Vieux-Québec–Cap-Blanc–colline Parlementaire
- Saint-Roch
- Saint-Jean-Baptiste
- Montcalm
- Saint-Sauveur
- Saint-Sacrement

Limoilou

- Vieux-Limoilou
- Lairet
- Maizerets

== La Cité ==
La Cité ("the city" or "the stronghold") is the historic heart of Quebec City. It was the entirety of the city until the nineteenth century expansions and amalgamations. The former borough was divided into six different districts before the 2009 reorganization. The central district of La Cité is Vieux-Québec—Cap-Blanc—colline Parlementaire. It is in turn centred on the old walled city, Old Quebec, and also includes nearby Parliament Hill, the Old Port, and the Petit Champlain shopping district. Other districts within La Cité are also home to much historic architecture and many important institutions.

== Limoilou ==
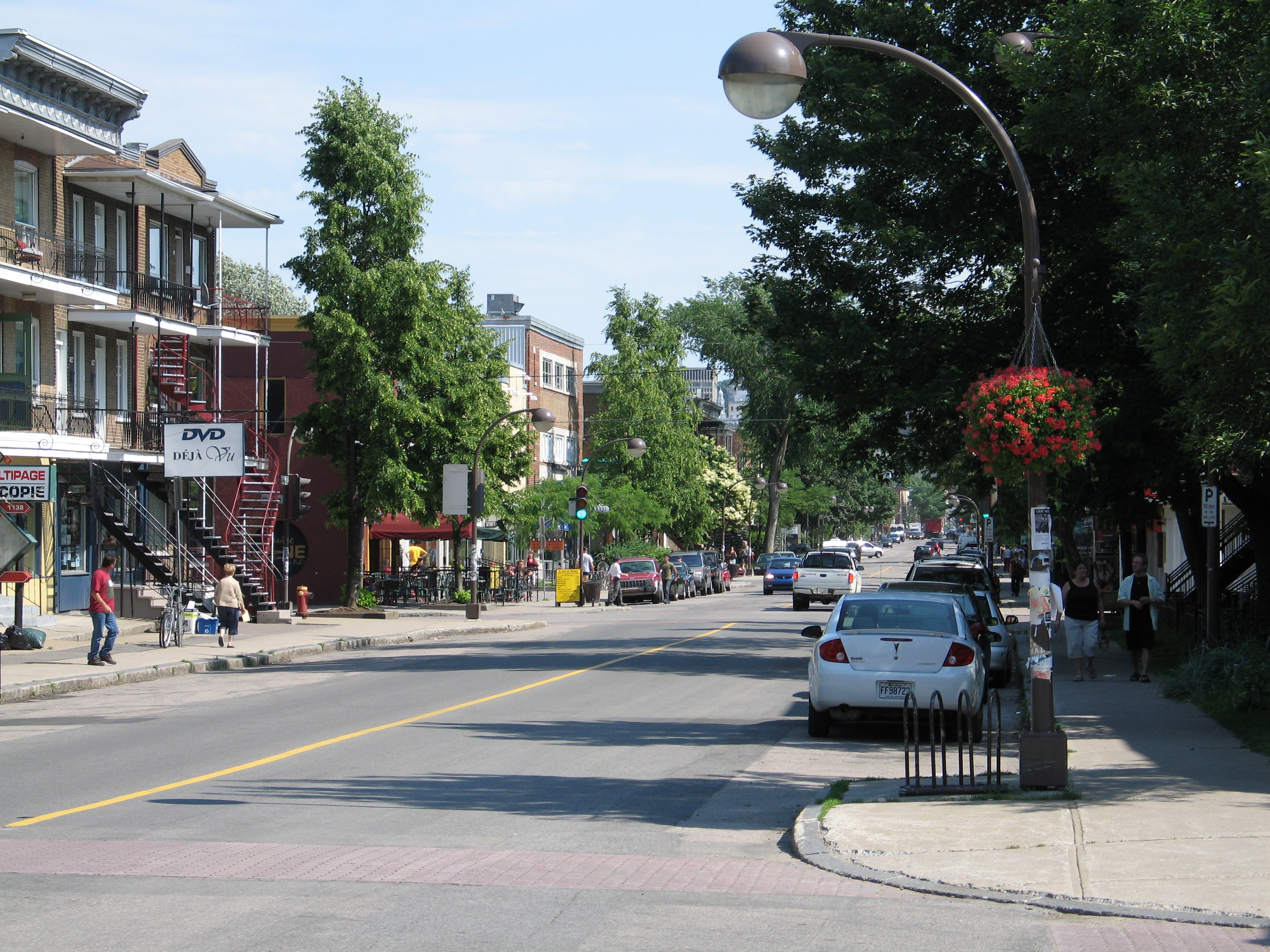
3rd Avenue, at the corner of 12th Street

Limoilou is a former borough of Quebec City. Population (2001): 44,980. It consisted of the neighbourhoods of Vieux-Limoilou, Lairet and Maizerets. It is bordered by the borough of Beauport in the northeast, by the borough of Charlesbourg in the northwest, by the borough of Les Rivières in the southwest, and by the former downtown borough of La Cité (now also part of La Cité-Limoilou) in the south. In terms of architecture, Limoilou is second only to La Cité as Quebec City's oldest neighbourhood. It is also Quebec City's second most densely populated borough, with 4,656 inhabitants/km^{2}. A defining characteristic of the neighbourhood is its grid pattern layout, and the numerical naming of its streets, such as 11th Street and 3rd Avenue.

=== History ===
The first recorded instance of the name "Limoilou" to designate this former municipality occurred in 1893. It is a variant of the word Limoëlou, the name of 16th century French explorer Jacques Cartier's manor in Saint-Malo, Brittany, France.

Up until the end of the 19th century, the territory of Limoilou was entirely rural. First the settlements of Stadacona and Hedleyville appeared along the shore of the Saint-Charles River. Originally a separate municipality, it was incorporated into Quebec City in 1909 with which came larger, more urban projects.

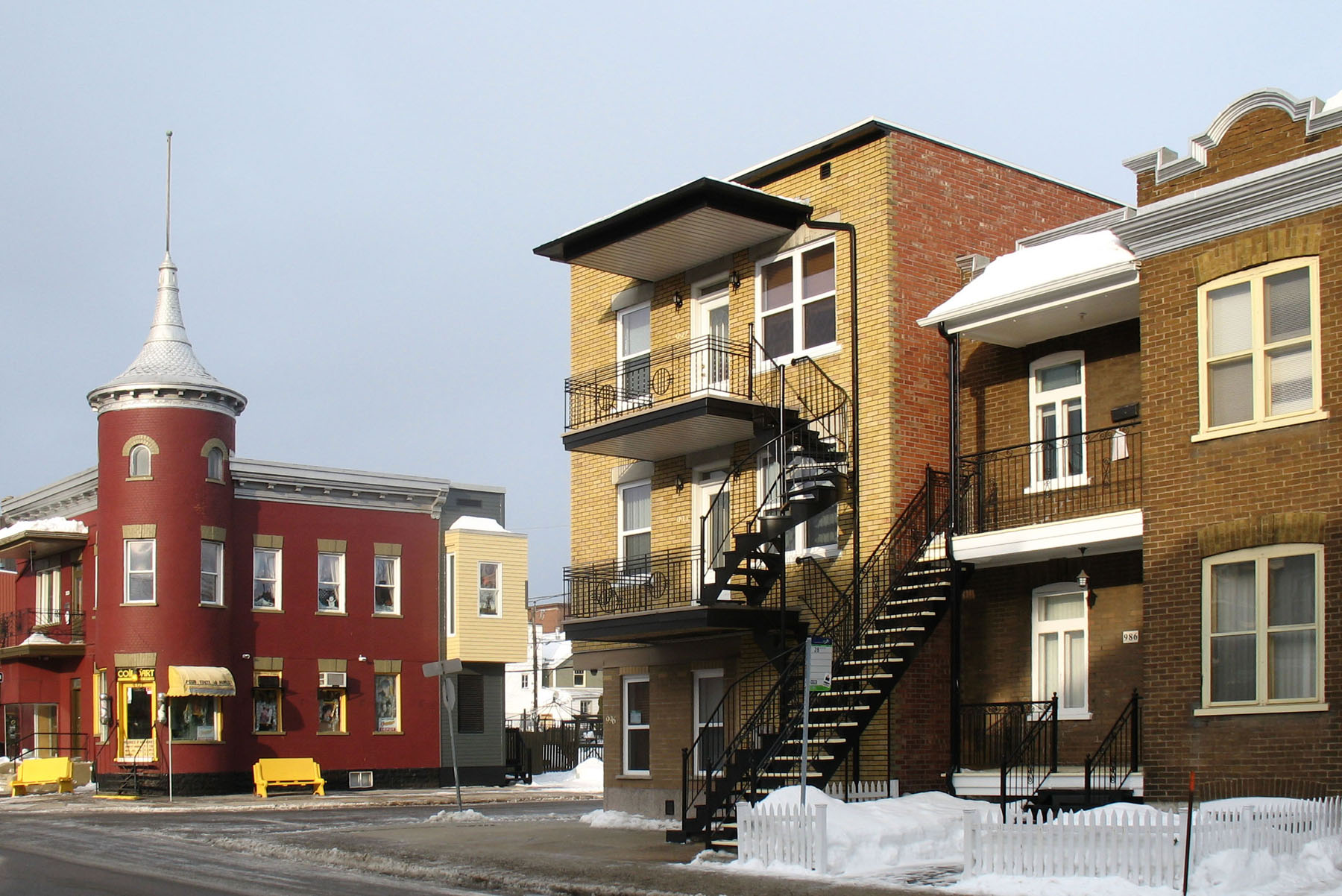
4th Avenue in Limoilou

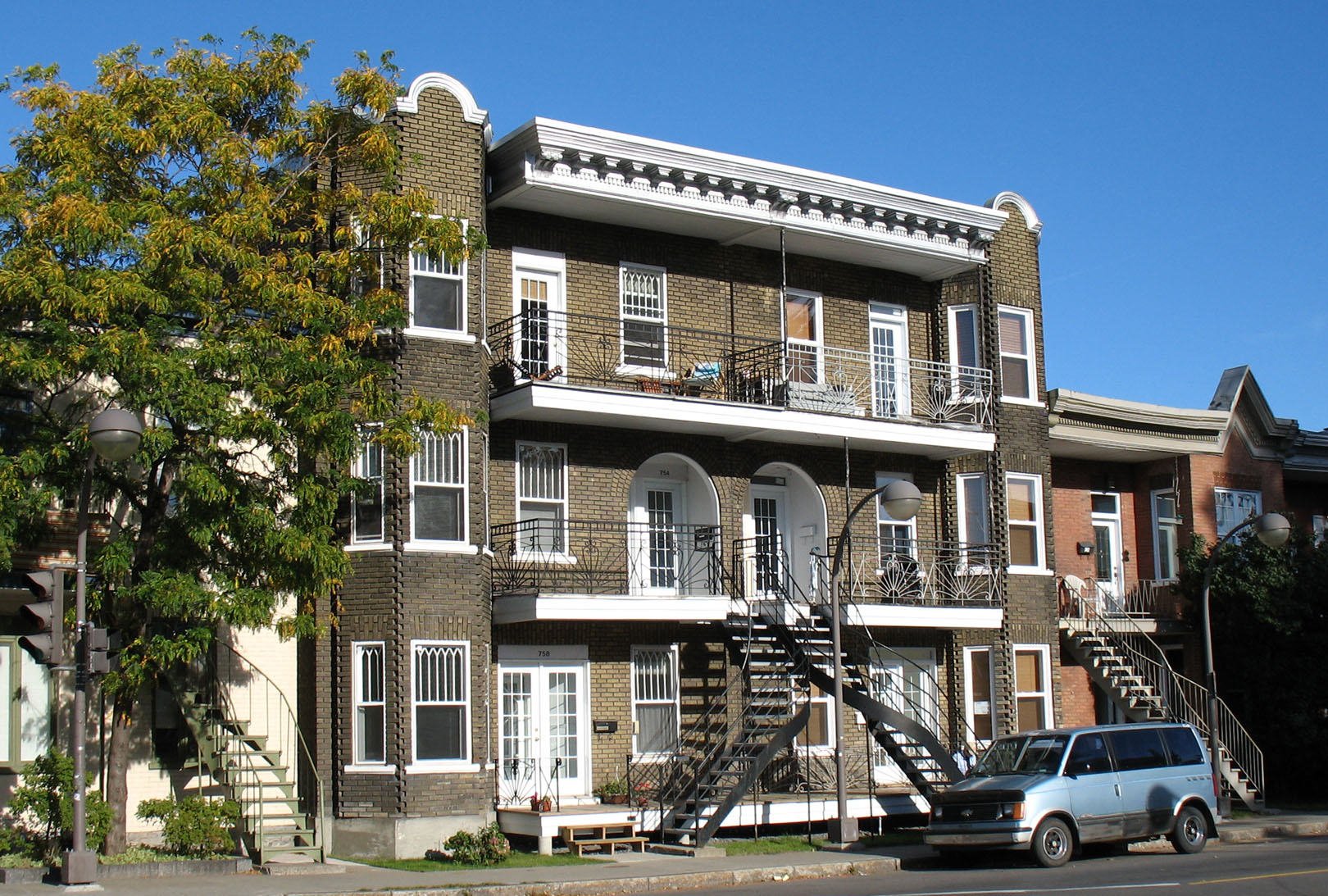
4th Avenue

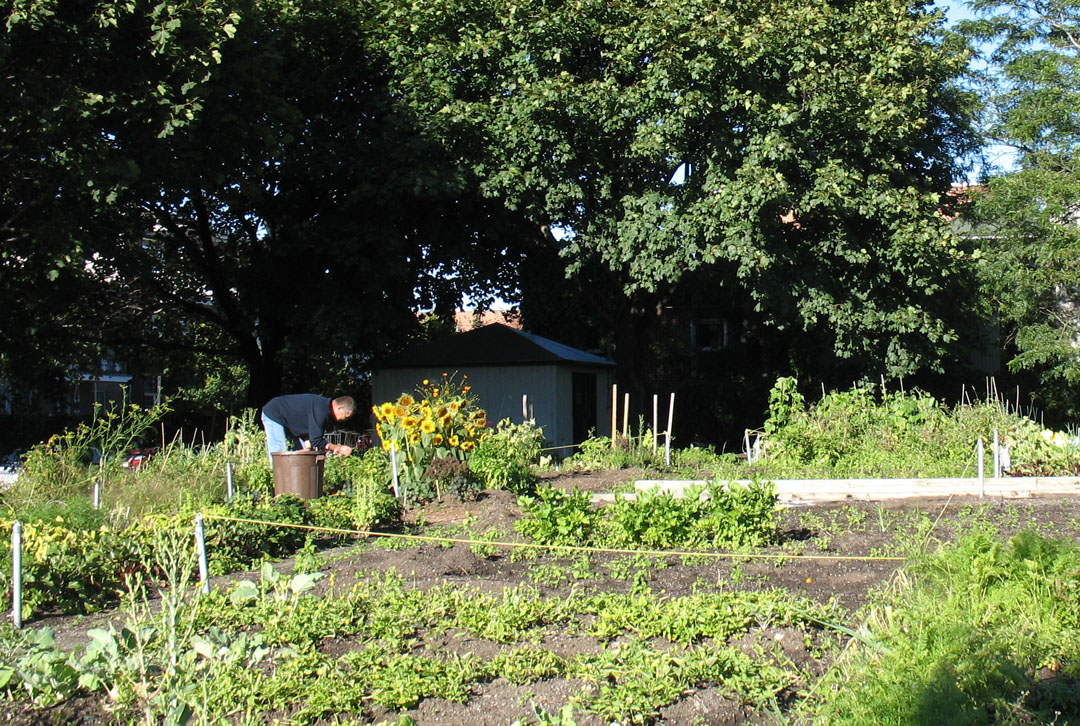
Community Garden, Rue des Sables

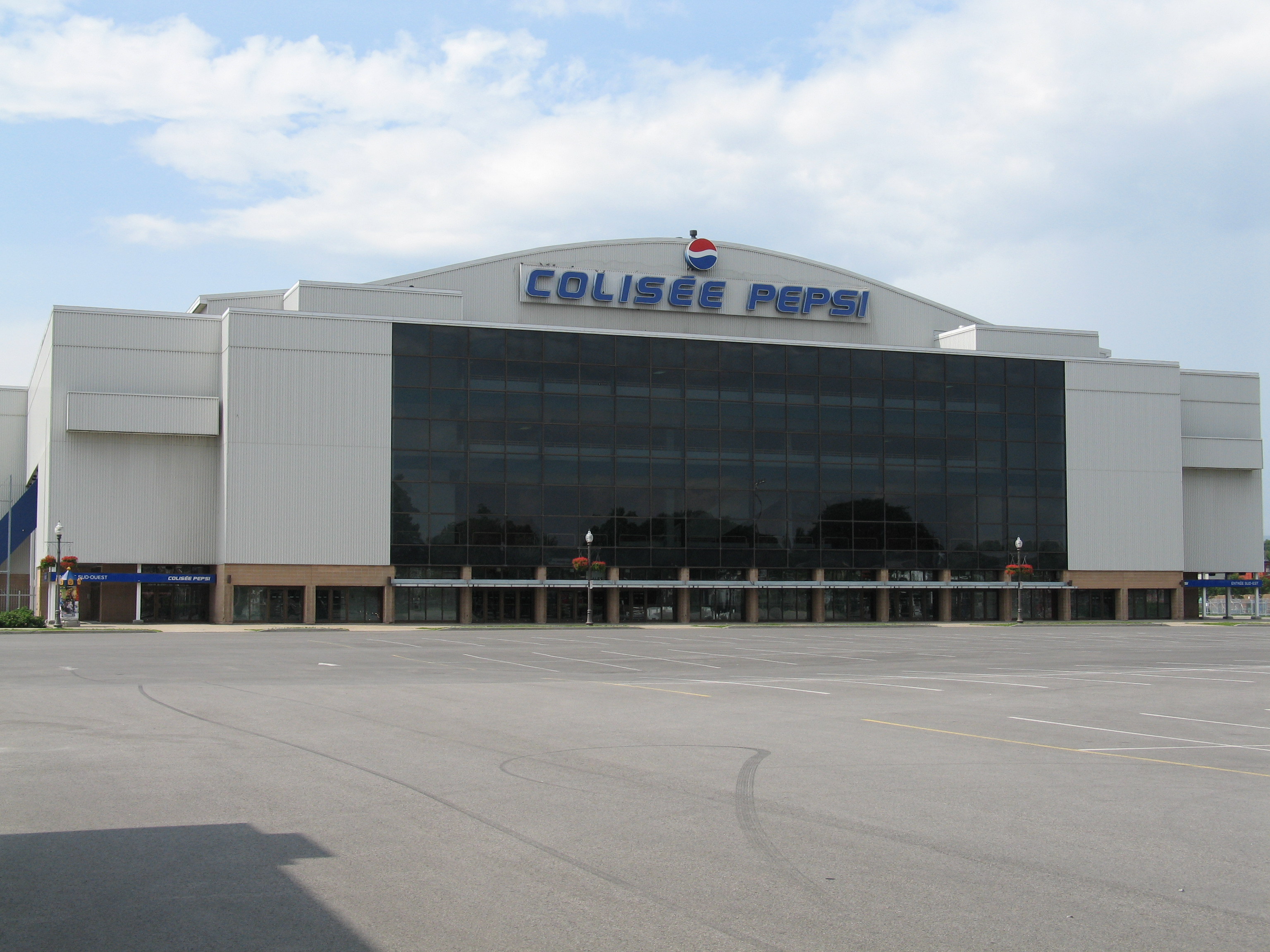
Le Colisée Pepsi

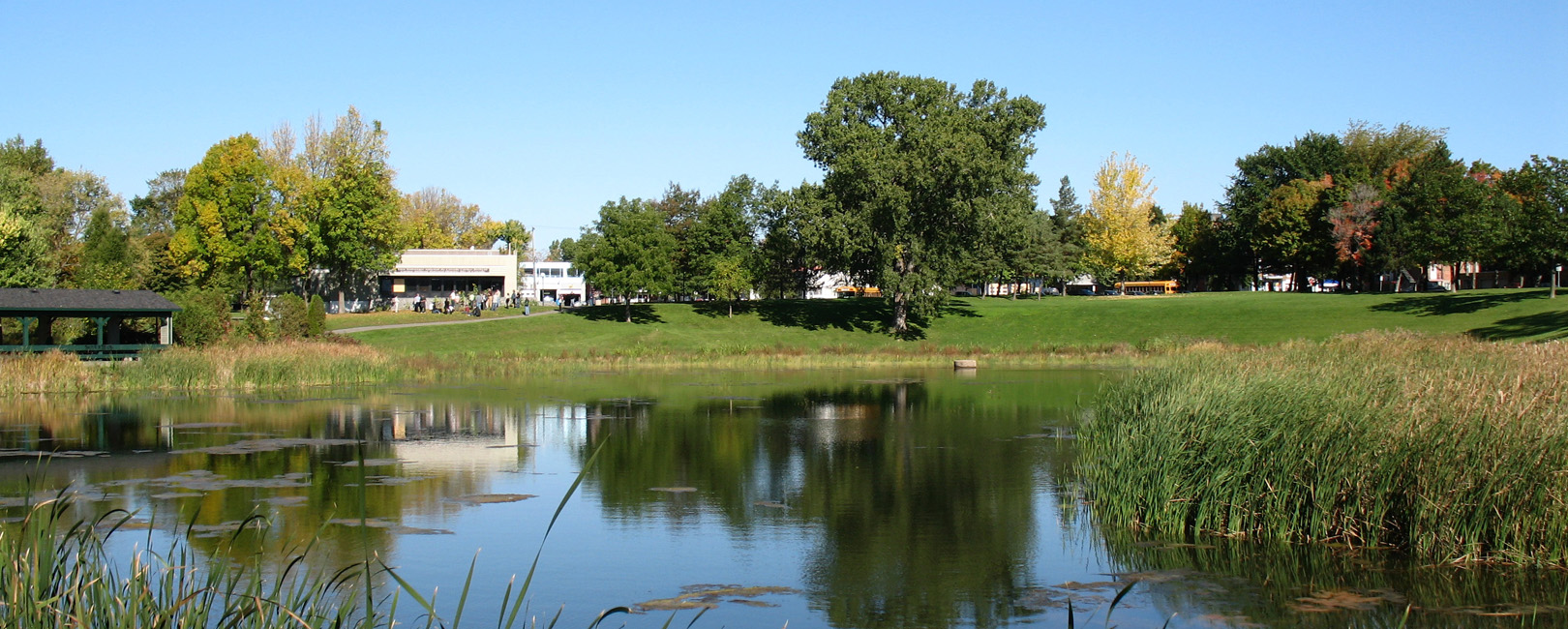
Parc Cartier-Brébeuf on the shore of the Saint-Charles River

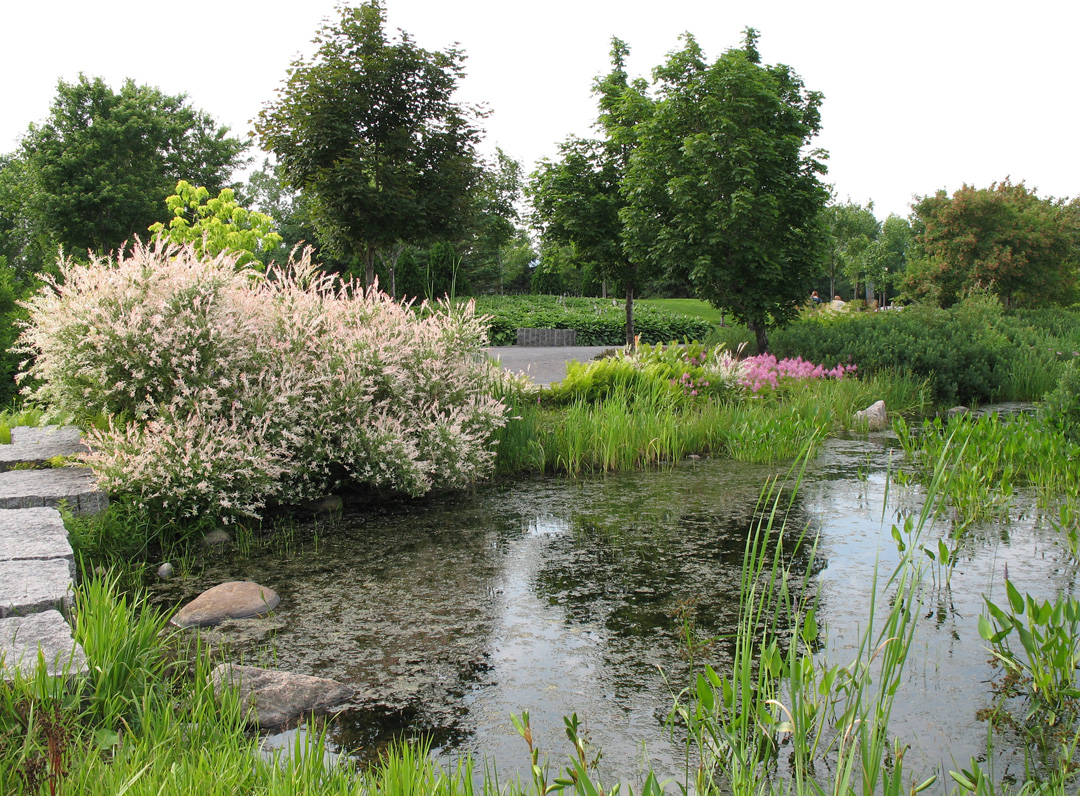
Parc du Domaine de Maizerets

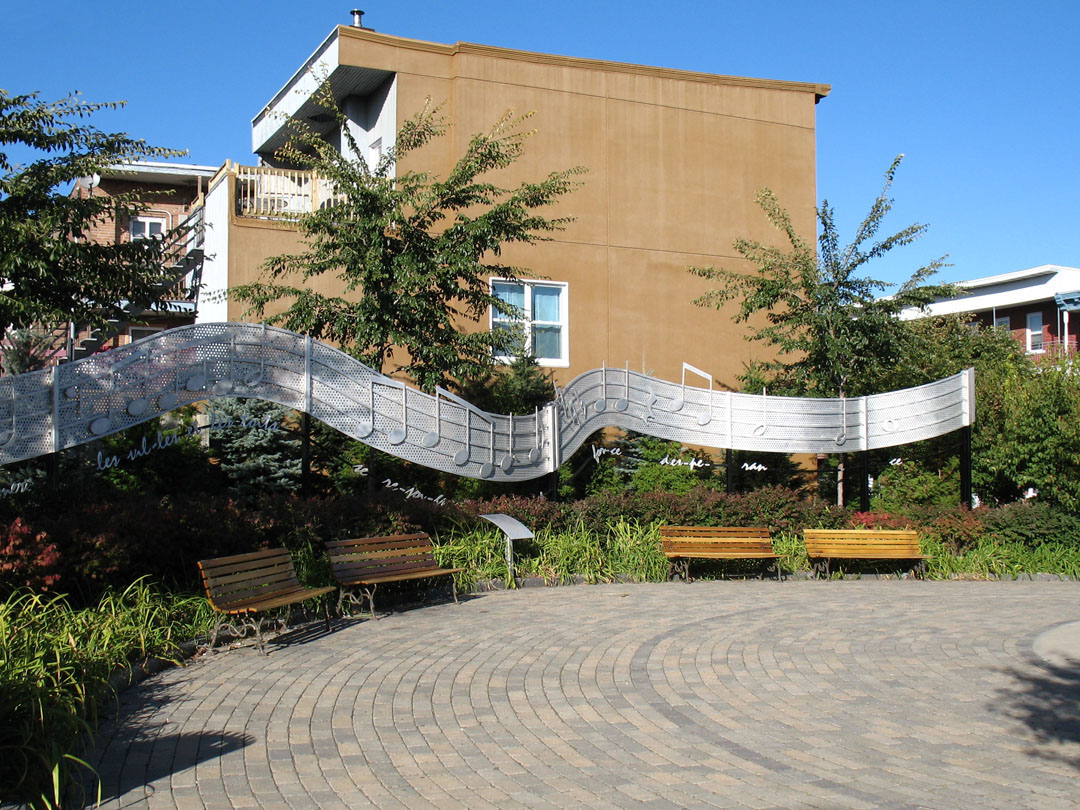
Parc Sylvain-Lelièvre, 4th Avenue

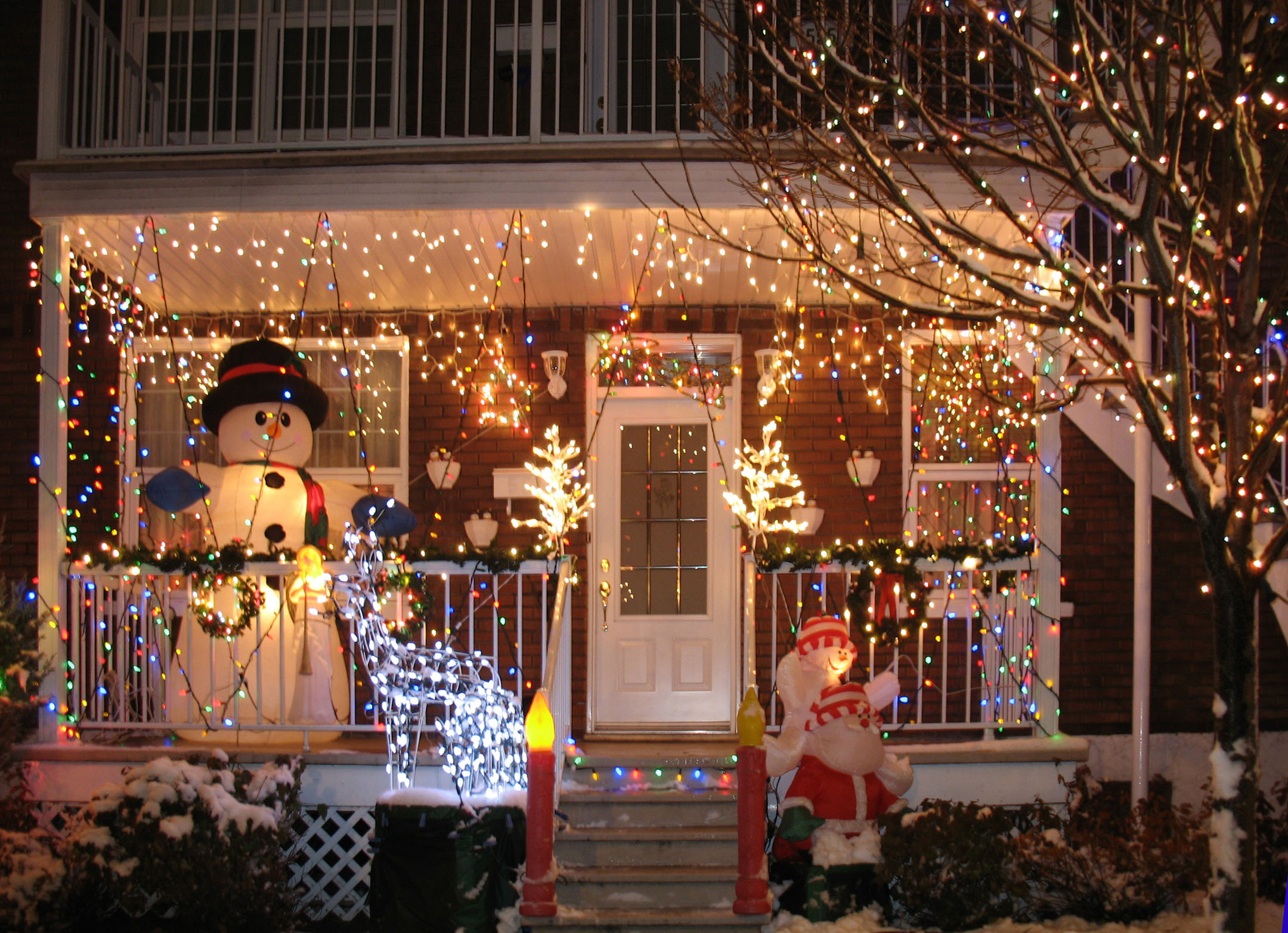
Christmas decorations in Limoilou

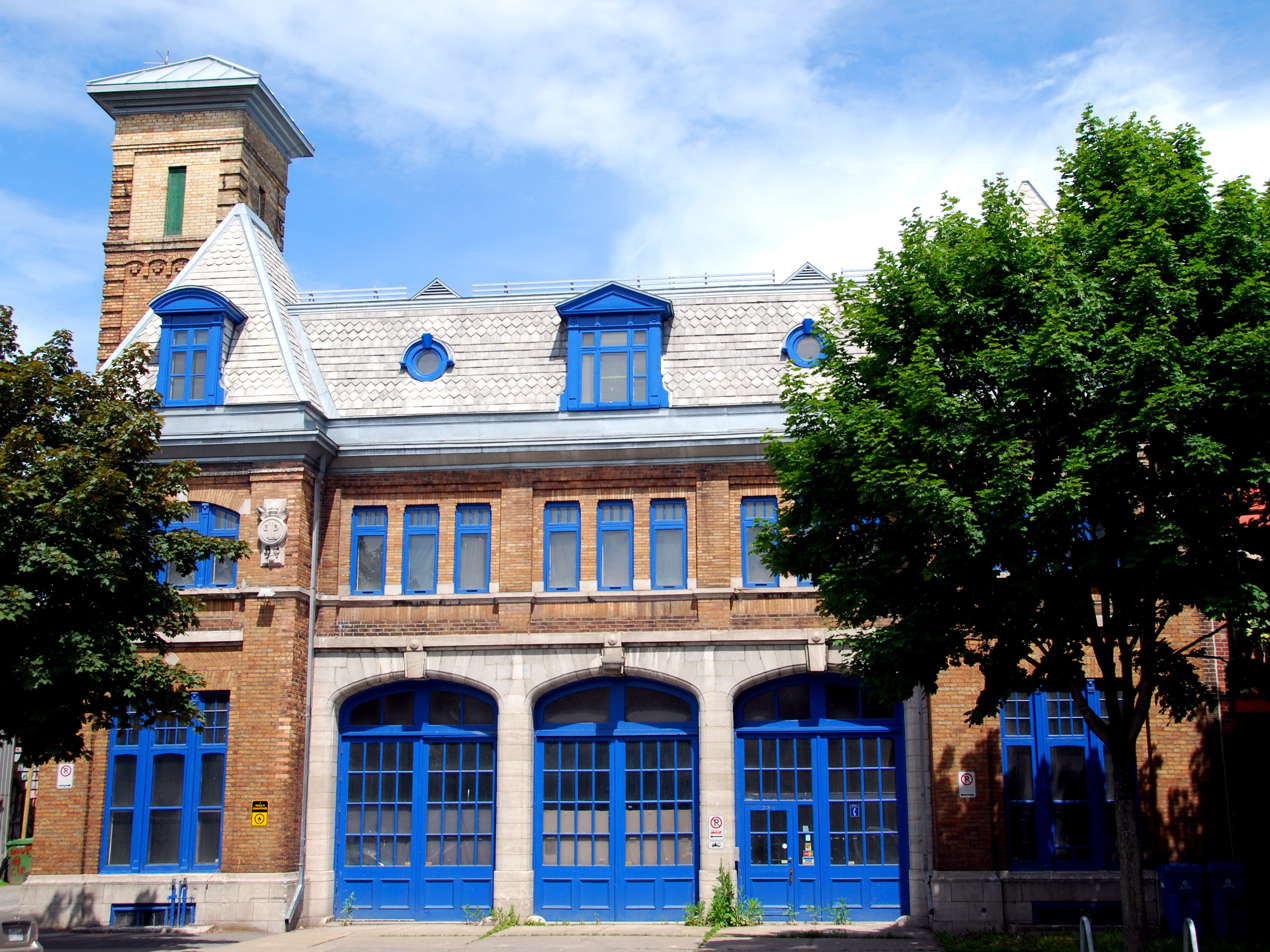
L'Autre Caserne is on the 5th Street in the Vieux-Limoilou neighbourhood

== See also ==
- List of former towns in Quebec
- Municipal reorganization in Quebec
