= Sainte-Foy, Quebec City =

Sainte-Foy
- Districts (French: quartiers)
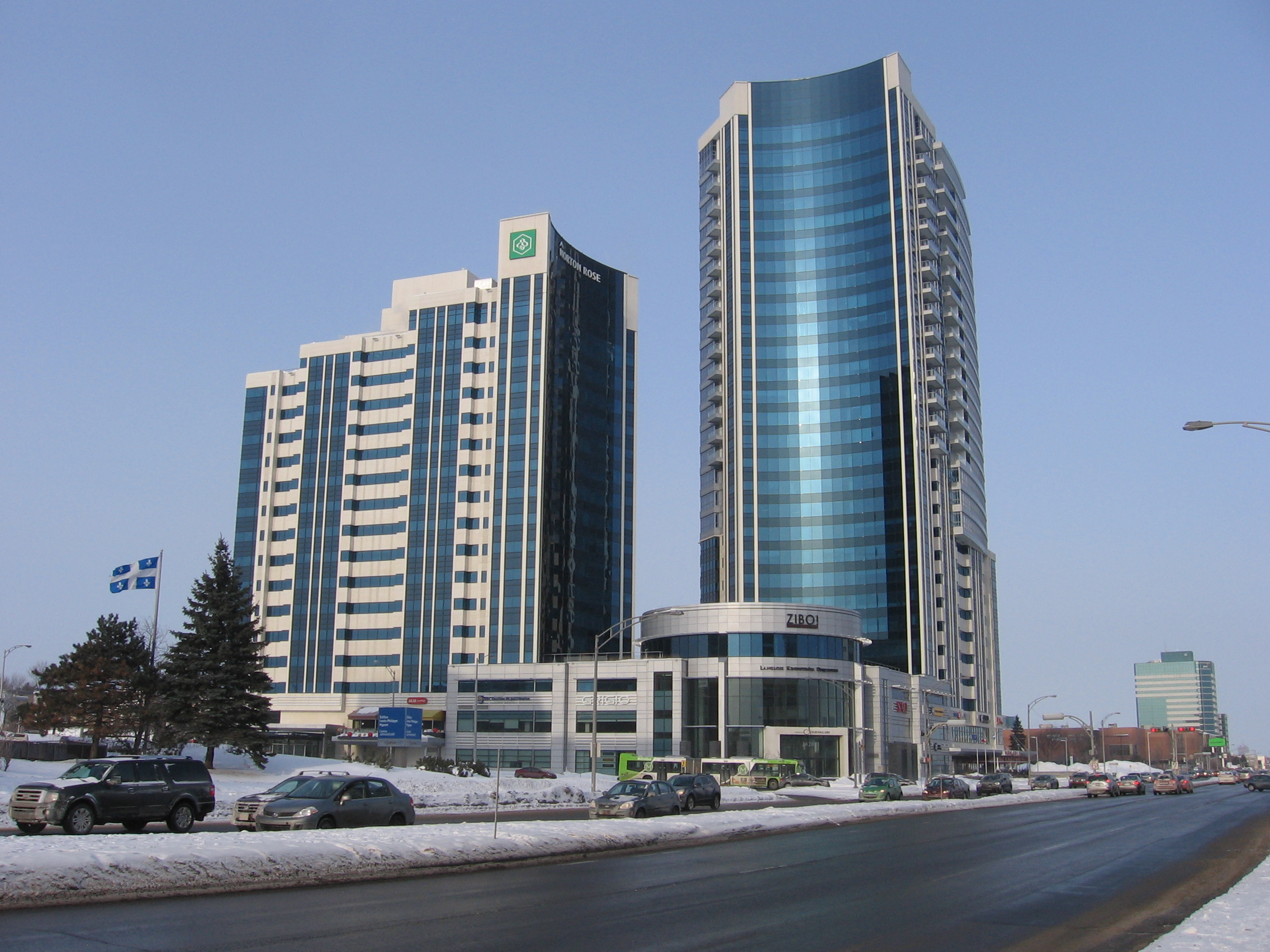
- Complexe Jules-Dallaire in Sainte-Foy

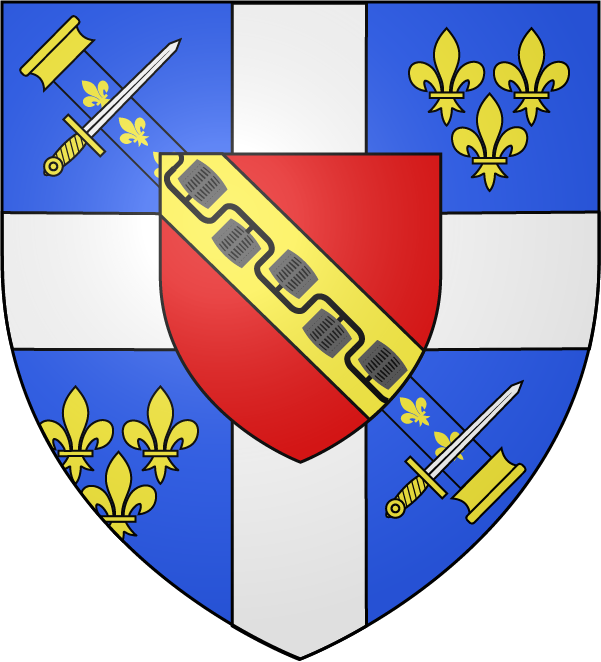
- Coat of arms
- Motto: "Fide Et Labore Valebo" (Latin) "My worthiness stems from my faith and labour"
- Sainte-Foy districts within the Sainte-Foy–Sillery–Cap-Rouge borough of Quebec City

- Sainte-Foy districts, Québec City
- Coordinates: 46°46′10″N 71°18′30″W
- Country: Canada
- Province: Quebec
- City: Quebec City
- Municipality: 1855
- District of Sainte-Foy–Sillery borough: 1 January 2002
- Districts of Sainte-Foy–Sillery–Cap-Rouge borough: Cité-Universitaire • Plateau • Saint-Louis • Pointe-de-Sainte-Foy: 1 November 2009

Government
  - Body: Conseil d'arrondissement

Area
  - Total: 83.87 km^{2} (32.38 sq mi)

Population (2006)^{[1]}
  - Total: 104,890
  - Density: 1,251/km^{2} (3,240/sq mi)
- Time zone: UTC−05:00 (EST)
  - Summer (DST): UTC−04:00 (EDT)

Sainte-Foy (English: /seɪntˈfwɑː/; French: [sɛ̃t fwa]) is a former city in central Quebec, Canada alongside the Saint Lawrence River. It was amalgamated into Quebec City at the start of 2002. Most of the formerly independent municipality of Sainte-Foy is located in the borough (French: arrondissement) of Sainte-Foy–Sillery–Cap-Rouge—initially as one of the two constituent districts of the former borough of Sainte-Foy–Sillery. On 1 November 2009, Sainte-Foy was subdivided into four separate districts: Cité-Universitaire, Plateau, Saint-Louis, Pointe-de-Sainte-Foy, when the borough of Sainte-Foy–Sillery–Cap-Rouge was formed.

Sainte-Foy is a major suburban neighbourhood west of downtown Quebec City. It plays a large part in Quebec City's economic life, with the Jean Lesage International Airport, Université Laval, multiple shopping malls, and both bridges to the south shore of the Saint Lawrence River.

== Demographics ==
According to the 2006 Canadian Census:

- Population: 76,262
- % change (2001–2006): +5.1
- Dwellings: 40,487
- Number of families: 20,680
- Area (km^{2}): 83.87 km^{2}
- Density (persons per km^{2}): 909.3

== History ==
In 1669, missionary priest Pierre-Joseph-Marie Chaumonot erected a chapel for the Wendat people (Huron), dedicated to Notre-Dame de la Foy. The name means Our Lady of Faith. Sainte-Foy developed around the chapel, first as a small settlement of Christian Indians, added to by traders and merchants.

The Battle of Sainte-Foy on April 28, 1760, sometimes called the Battle of Quebec, was a victory for the French in the Seven Years' War (known in the United States as the French and Indian War for the North American front). Their forces were commanded by Chevalier de Lévis and defeated the British army under James Murray. This battle proved to be much bloodier than the battle of the Plains of Abraham the previous September, with higher total casualties on both sides—833 French casualties and 1,124 British. Despite this the French were unable to take Quebec and it was to be the last French victory in the Seven Years' War, which the British ultimately won. France ceded its territories in North America east of the Mississippi River to the British.

Sainte-Foy's long-time flamboyant mayor, Andrée Boucher, was defeated when she ran for mayor of the amalgamated Quebec City. She became a radio host. In 2005, she ran again for mayor after Jean-Paul L'Allier retired. This time she won, without hiring an election team or paying for media advertisements, and with making very few public appearances or debates. She has since died since her last political position.

As a city, Sainte-Foy hosted international events such as the 1983 FINA Women's Water Polo World Cup and the 1995 World Aquatics U20 Water Polo Championships.

=== Amalgamation with Quebec City ===
On January 1, 2002, Sainte-Foy was merged, along with many other suburbs, with Quebec City. A referendum was held June 20, 2004, with 52.19% of voters in favour of a demerger. However, only 27.19% of voters turned out, short of the 35% threshold for the referendum to pass.

== Districts ==
- Cité universitaire – centred around Université Laval, it has a very large student population. The majority of Saint-Foy's commercial activity is found along Laurier Boulevard, such as Laurier Québec, Place Sainte-Foy and Place de la Cité shopping malls. A number of large hotels and office buildings line the boulevard and this area has become one of the city's major commercial centres.
- Saint-Louis – leafy residential area south of Laurier Boulevard towards the river. Contains the Aquarium du Québec.
- Plateau – sprawling suburban area north of Boulevard Laurier, featuring post-war single storey houses and an abundance of 1960s apartment blocks.

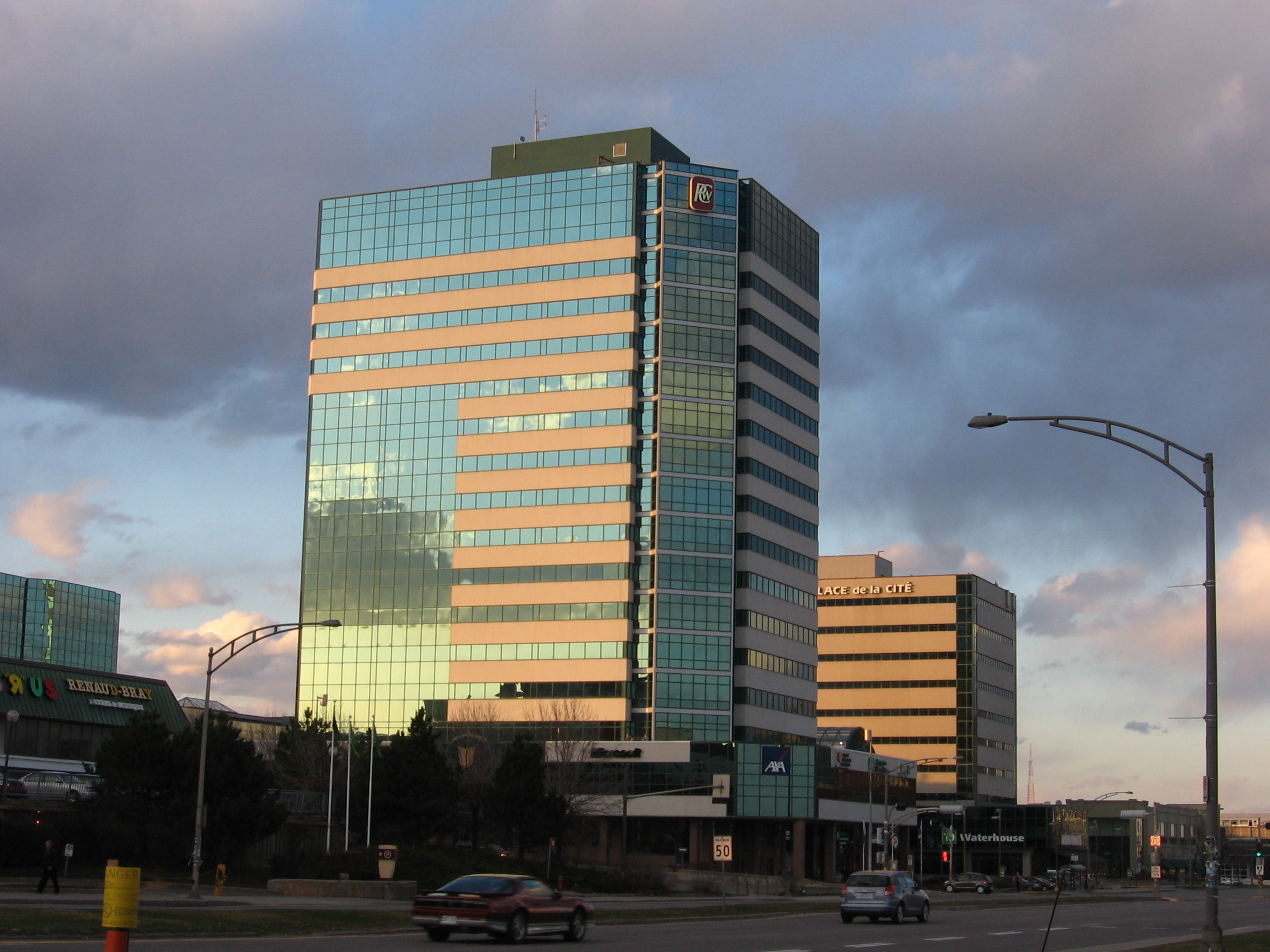
Commercial district

- Pointe-de-Sainte-Foy – recent large residential development, centred on the Campanile shopping street. The neighbourhood consists mostly of large modern condo and apartment blocks.
- L'Aéroport – industrial area centred on the Jean Lesage International Airport with many big-box stores. L'Aéroport district's land was initially part of the parish of Notre-Dame-de-Lorette—later the independent city of L'Ancienne-Lorette. L'Aéroport's territory was merged into the formerly independent city of Sainte-Foy's jurisdiction in 1971. However, L'Aéroport became a district of the former borough of Laurentien, in 2002. When Laurentien was dissolved as an administrative entity as part of the 2009 reorganization of Quebec City's boroughs, L'Aéroport became a district of Sainte-Foy–Sillery–Cap-Rouge.

== Economy ==
Aeropro has its head office on the grounds of Jean Lesage Airport in Sainte-Foy. It conducts business charters and recreational and sightseeing flights Prior to its dissolution, regional airline Air Nova had its Quebec offices in Sainte-Foy.

Major companies operating in the district include PriceWaterhouseCoopers, Ernst & Young, Microsoft and the headquarters of SSQ Financial Group.

Sainte-Foy is at the northern end of the Quebec Bridge, which links to the south shore of the Saint Lawrence River at Lévis.

== Education ==
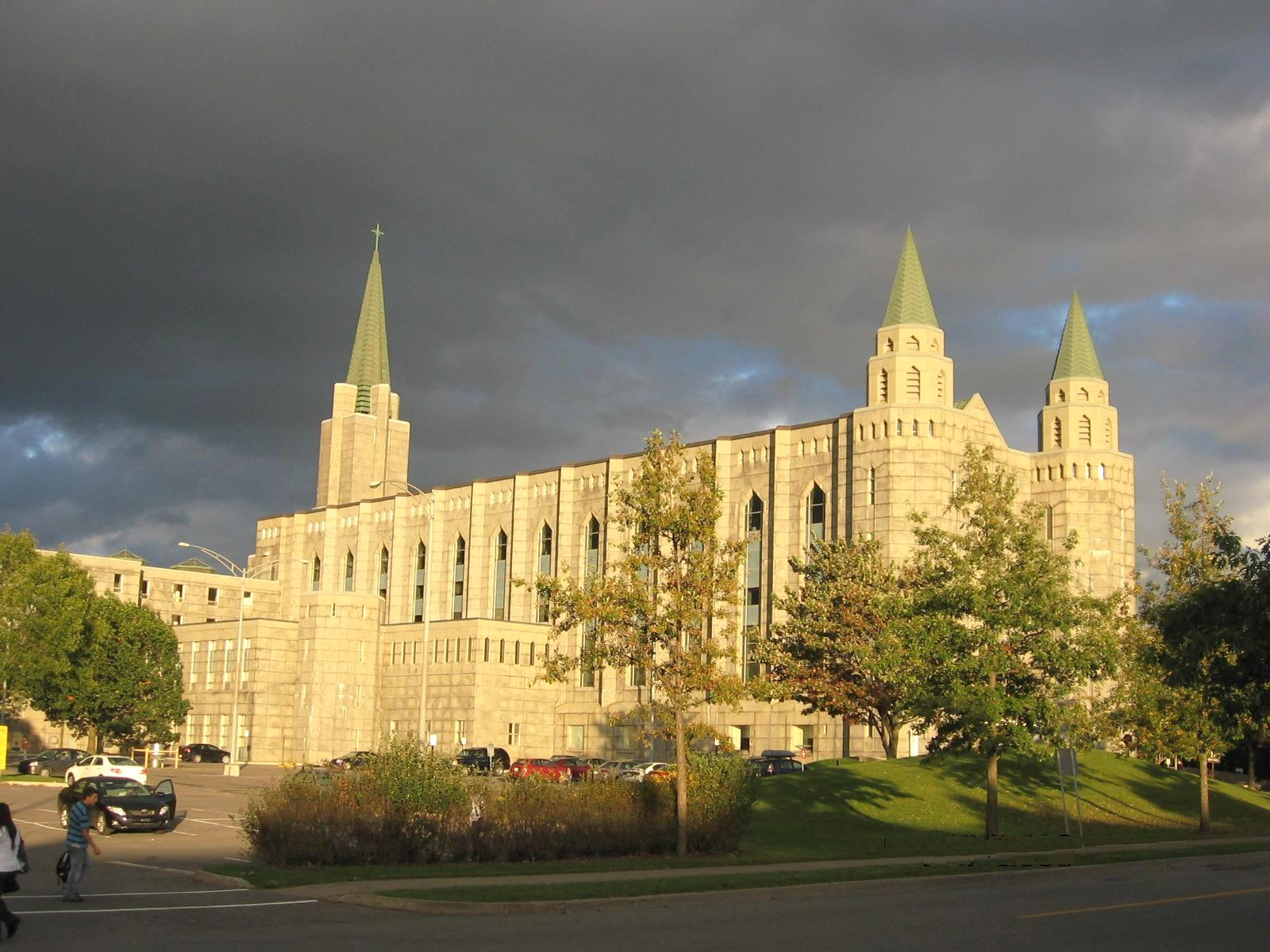
Louis-Jacques Casault Pavillon at Université Laval

Sainte-Foy is also the site of many educational institutions:

- Université Laval
- Cégep de Sainte-Foy
- Cégep Garneau
- Collège de Champigny
- Champlain College St. Lawrence
- Rochebelle High School –
- Collège des Compagnons –
- Université du Québec École Nationale d'Administration Publique (formerly)

== Transport ==
Sainte-Foy station is a VIA Rail station on the Quebec City–Windsor Corridor. It is roughly three kilometres from the Gare d'Autocar de Ste-Foy, and ten kilometres from Jean Lesage Airport.

The Gare d'Autocar is a regional hub for Orleans Express, Intercar, the Réseau de transport de la Capitale, the Société de transport de Lévis, and several regional government-funded shuttles, for example Portneuf.

Air France has a bus service from Sainte-Foy bus station to Montreal Dorval Airport for its customers only.

== Climate ==
Climate data for Sainte-Foy, Quebec City (Québec City Jean Lesage International Airport) WMO ID: 71708; coordinates 46°48′N 71°23′W; elevation: 74.4 m (244 ft); 1991–2020 normals, extremes 1875–present (Note: Based on station coordinates provided by Environment and Climate Change Canada, climate data was recorded in the area of Old Quebec from August 1875 to February 1959, and at Québec City Jean Lesage International Airport from March 1943 to present.)
Month	Jan	Feb	Mar	Apr	May	Jun	Jul	Aug	Sep	Oct	Nov	Dec	Year
Record high humidex	10.6	11.7	19.9	32.9	40.3	44.1	49.2	49.3	40.1	30.9	24.9	14.6	49.3
Record high °C (°F)	17.7 (63.9)	12.0 (53.6)	18.3 (64.9)	29.9 (85.8)	33.1 (91.6)	34.2 (93.6)	35.6 (96.1)	34.4 (93.9)	33.9 (93.0)	28.3 (82.9)	22.9 (73.2)	13.9 (57.0)	35.6 (96.1)
Mean maximum °C (°F)	4.6 (40.3)	4.6 (40.3)	9.5 (49.1)	19.9 (67.8)	28.0 (82.4)	30.4 (86.7)	31.1 (88.0)	30.0 (86.0)	27.1 (80.8)	20.8 (69.4)	14.6 (58.3)	6.2 (43.2)	31.9 (89.4)
Mean daily maximum °C (°F)	−7.1 (19.2)	−5.0 (23.0)	0.4 (32.7)	8.3 (46.9)	17.5 (63.5)	22.5 (72.5)	25.0 (77.0)	24.0 (75.2)	19.1 (66.4)	11.3 (52.3)	3.6 (38.5)	−3.3 (26.1)	9.7 (49.5)
Daily mean °C (°F)	−11.9 (10.6)	−10.4 (13.3)	−4.5 (23.9)	3.5 (38.3)	11.6 (52.9)	16.7 (62.1)	19.5 (67.1)	18.4 (65.1)	13.7 (56.7)	6.8 (44.2)	−0.1 (31.8)	−7.3 (18.9)	4.7 (40.5)
Mean daily minimum °C (°F)	−16.7 (1.9)	−15.7 (3.7)	−9.3 (15.3)	−1.2 (29.8)	5.6 (42.1)	10.8 (51.4)	13.9 (57.0)	12.8 (55.0)	8.3 (46.9)	2.4 (36.3)	−3.8 (25.2)	−11.4 (11.5)	−0.4 (31.3)
Mean minimum °C (°F)	−29.3 (−20.7)	−27.2 (−17.0)	−22.4 (−8.3)	−9.0 (15.8)	−1.2 (29.8)	4.6 (40.3)	8.4 (47.1)	6.7 (44.1)	0.8 (33.4)	−4.6 (23.7)	−13.6 (7.5)	−24.3 (−11.7)	−30.4 (−22.7)
Record low °C (°F)	−36.7 (−34.1)	−36.1 (−33.0)	−32.6 (−26.7)	−19.3 (−2.7)	−7.8 (18.0)	−1.3 (29.7)	3.9 (39.0)	2.2 (36.0)	−4.8 (23.4)	−10.0 (14.0)	−24.0 (−11.2)	−33.4 (−28.1)	−36.7 (−34.1)
Record low wind chill	−51.1	−52.4	−41.0	−29.0	−13.6	−1.7	0.0	0.0	−7.8	−17.3	−30.8	−48.4	−52.4
Average precipitation mm (inches)	86.7 (3.41)	65.7 (2.59)	77.7 (3.06)	94.4 (3.72)	91.8 (3.61)	114.7 (4.52)	118.7 (4.67)	108.7 (4.28)	111.3 (4.38)	115.8 (4.56)	90.9 (3.58)	96.2 (3.79)	1,172.6 (46.17)
Average rainfall mm (inches)	24.6 (0.97)	13.8 (0.54)	30.2 (1.19)	71.3 (2.81)	—	—	—	—	—	—	61.7 (2.43)	33.7 (1.33)	—
Average snowfall cm (inches)	69.1 (27.2)	64.3 (25.3)	50.3 (19.8)	13.1 (5.2)	—	—	—	—	—	—	25.6 (10.1)	75.7 (29.8)	—
Average precipitation days (≥ 0.2 mm)	18.2	14.7	14.0	13.7	13.6	13.5	14.7	13.0	12.3	14.9	14.9	18.5	175.9
Average rainy days (≥ 0.2 mm)	3.3	2.2	4.3	10.3	—	—	—	—	—	—	9.5	4.4	—
Average snowy days (≥ 0.2 cm)	15.4	13.2	10.2	4	—	—	—	—	—	—	7.0	16.5	—
Average relative humidity (%) (at 1500 LST)	70.0	65.5	61.1	56.5	52.2	56.9	59.3	60.1	62.7	65.4	70.6	75.1	63.0
Average dew point °C (°F)	−15.2 (4.6)	−14.1 (6.6)	−9.0 (15.8)	−2.7 (27.1)	4.7 (40.5)	11.0 (51.8)	14.6 (58.3)	13.9 (57.0)	9.9 (49.8)	3.1 (37.6)	−3.3 (26.1)	−9.9 (14.2)	0.3 (32.5)
Mean monthly sunshine hours	98.9	121.2	152.0	170.6	211.1	234.7	252.3	232.0	163.0	122.0	76.6	81.9	1,916.3
Percentage possible sunshine	35.5	41.8	41.3	41.9	45.3	49.6	52.7	52.7	43.1	36.0	27.1	30.7	41.5
Average ultraviolet index	1	2	3	4	6	7	7	6	5	3	1	1	4
Source 1: Environment and Climate Change Canada (sun 1981–2010) (extremes 1875–1959} and Weather Atlas (UV index)
Source 2: weatherstats.ca (for dewpoint and monthly/yearly average absolute maximum/minimum temperature)

== Recreation ==
Sainte-Foy possesses has three ice hockey rinks, one sports centre, 33 soccer fields, 2 Interior Pools, 13 exterior pools, three cinemas, one theatre, Laurier Québec, Place de La Cite, and La Pyramide. Sainte-Foy also has excellent representation in all sports: the Governors in hockey, the Caravelles and Arsenal in soccer, and the Musketeers ESCC in basketball.

== Notable residents ==
- Yves Bélanger, cinematographer and Canadian Screen Award recipient
- Sylvie Bernier, Olympic diver and 1984 gold medalist
- Lionel Fleury, president of the Canadian Amateur Hockey Association and Quebec Amateur Hockey Association
- Simon Gagné, ice hockey player
- Jean Leloup, singer and songwriter also known as "John the Wolf"
- Steve Penney, ice hockey goaltender
- Patrick Roy, ice hockey goaltender
- Marianna O'Gallagher, Irish-Quebecer historian

== See also ==
- Sainte-Foy–Sillery–Cap-Rouge
- Municipal reorganization in Quebec
- List of former cities in Quebec
- Sillery
- Cap-Rouge
- Laurentien
