= Collège de Champigny =

Coordinates: 46.7908°N 71.3610°W

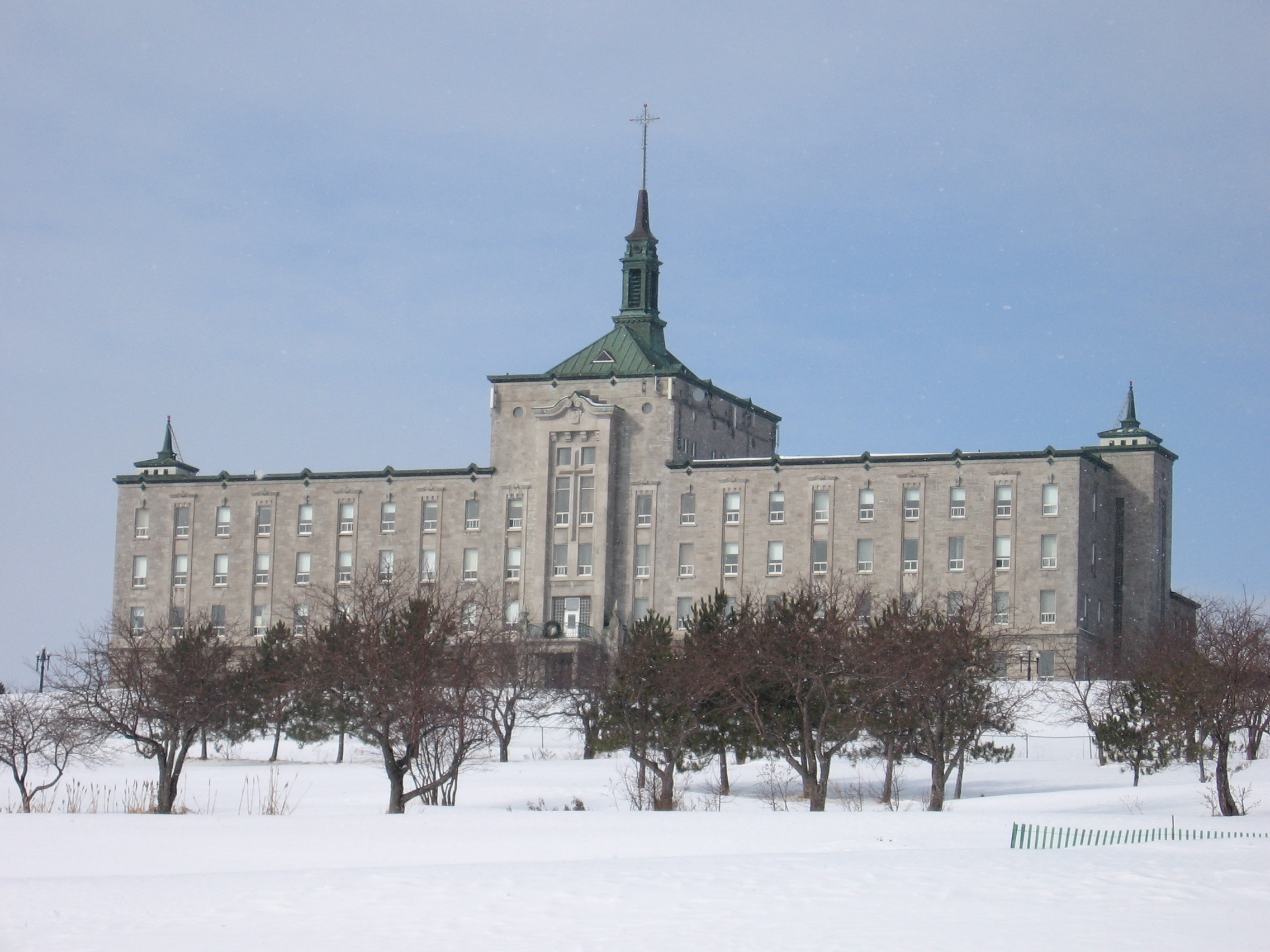
- 1400 route de l'Aéroport; Quebec City, Quebec; Canada

Information
- Type: Private
- Opened: 1969
- Director: Jean Garneau
- Language: French
- Website: www.collegedechampigny.com

The Collège de Champigny is a private secondary school. Founded by the Sacred Heart Brothers in 1969, it was established to provide education to everyone, according to the wishes of Father André Coindre, its founder.

It is the only private school in L'Ancienne-Lorette and in the Sainte-Foy sector of Québec City.

From 1945 to 1967, the mission of the Sacred Heart Brothers in the college was to form future priests and brothers. Part of the building still houses the brothers and former professors.
