= Laurentien, Quebec City =

Former borough of Quebec City, Quebec, Canada

Coordinates: 46°50′40″N 71°26′08″W

Boroughs of Quebec City prior to October 31, 2009.

Current boroughs of Quebec City as of November 1.

Laurentien (French pronunciation: [loʁɑ̃sjɛ̃]; 2001 census population 82,965) is a former borough of Quebec City. It comprised Val-Bélair, Cap-Rouge and part of Sainte-Foy.

Before January 1, 2006, Saint-Augustin-de-Desmaures and L'Ancienne-Lorette were also part of this borough, but they were restored as separate municipalities.

In the reorganization of Quebec City's boroughs on November 1, 2009, Laurentien was divided between the boroughs of Sainte-Foy–Sillery–Cap-Rouge and La Haute-Saint-Charles.

== See also ==
- Municipal reorganization in Quebec
