= Administrative divisions of Quebec =

Overview of political subdivisions of Quebec

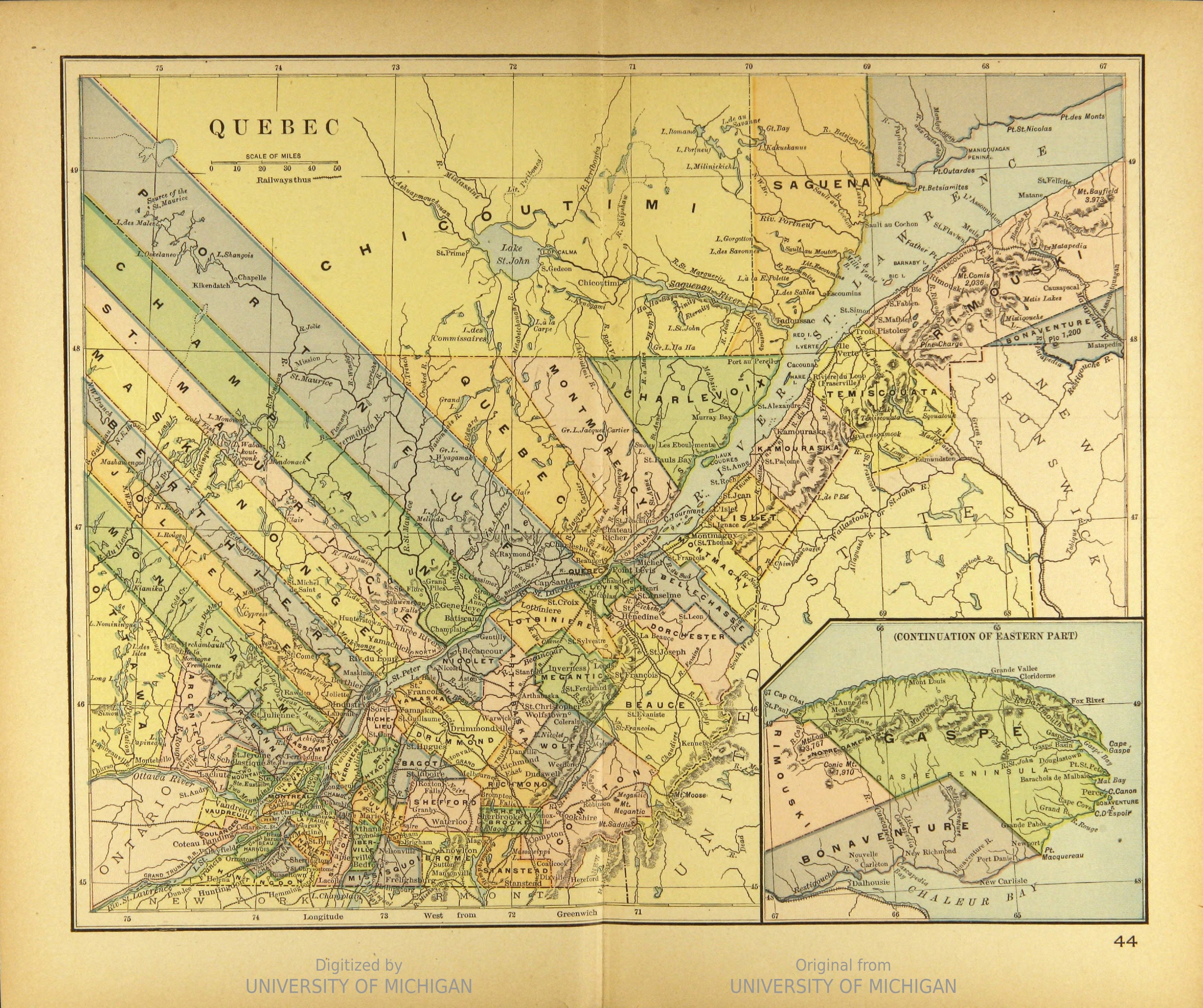
Administrative divisions of Quebec in 1894

The Province of Quebec is divided into entities that deliver local government, along with other types of functional divisions.

== Local municipalities ==
The primary level of local organization is the local municipality. This general term includes specific types of municipalities in Quebec such as city or town, municipality, village, parish, township, and northern village.

Municipal governments are authorities that are elected locally to provide services that are best managed locally. Revenue for services is mostly raised via property taxes and other local sources. They are created by the province under the Cities and Towns Act and the Municipal Code of Québec.

Municipalities have power over public transport, fire protection and emergency, municipal court, drinking water, sewage, and rubbish collection. Shared powers with the province include housing, roads, police, recreation and culture, parks, and urban planning.

Quebec has a multi-tier system, with a layer of government between the municipality and the province, for example urban agglomeration, regional county municipality, or metropolitan community. Montreal, Quebec City, Longueuil, Sherbrooke, Saguenay, Lévis, Métis-sur-Mer and Grenville-sur-la-Rouge are divided into arrondissements (boroughs), sub-municipal entities that have mayors and councillors.

Elections are held across the province on the same day in every municipality every four years.

=== Agglomerations ===
Urban agglomerations (UA) are collections of municipalities with certain shared services, managed by the agglomeration council. The council is formed from elected officials from all of the municipalities, and votes are weighted according to the relative population of each municipality. Each agglomeration contains a "central municipality" which has extended powers; the mayor of the central municipality becomes the ex-officio mayor of the agglomeration council. The UAs of Montréal, Québec, and Longueuil have each been delegated powers usually reserved for regional county municipalities.

The urban agglomerations are:

- Urban agglomeration of Montreal
- Urban agglomeration of Quebec City
- Urban agglomeration of Longueuil
- Urban agglomeration of Mont-Laurier
- Urban agglomeration of La Tuque
- Urban agglomeration of Les Îles-de-la-Madeleine
- Urban agglomeration of Sainte-Agathe-des-Monts
- Urban agglomeration of Mont-Tremblant
- Urban agglomeration of Cookshire-Eaton
- Urban agglomeration of Rivière-Rouge
- Urban agglomeration of Sainte-Marguerite–Estérel

Urban agglomerations came into effect after the 2000–2006 municipal reorganization in Quebec, which saw the provincial government merging municipalities in large cities against the wishes of many of the municipalities, themselves.

== Supralocal organizations ==
=== Regional county municipalities ===
Regional county municipalities coordinate among neighbouring municipalities on services. There are 86 in total. Most municipalities belong to an RCM. None of the municipalities in the Urban agglomeration of Montreal are in an RCM. Other municipalities have certain powers usually reserved for RCMs, including Québec, Saguenay, Trois-Rivières, Longueuil, Lévis, Shawinigan, Sherbrooke, Laval, Mirabel, Rouyn-Noranda, Gatineau, Les Îles-de-la-Madeleine and La Tuque.

RCMs have responsibility for territorial planning, realty assessment, waste management, emergency planning, local economic development and employment assistance as well as local financing of the local development centre or CLD.

The powers of the RCM are exercised by the RCM council. It is composed of the mayors of each of the member municipalities and possibly other elected municipal officials as well as a warden. Depending on the RCM, a warden can either be appointed by the council (in which case the warden must be one of the mayors) or elected by universal suffrage (in which case they cannot hold any other elective office).

The voting strength of each municipality on the council is determined in part by its population, but a formula is used to prevent a small number of large municipalities from making decisions unilaterally.

Unorganized territories are unincorporated areas that are not part of any municipality. Municipal authority is exercised the MRC or equivalent to which they belong.

==== Nord-du-Québec ====
The three territories equivalent to a regional county municipality

The Nord-du-Québec is divided into three territories each equivalent to a regional municipality:

- The Kativik Regional Government offers regional services to 14 northern villages and associated Inuit reserved lands as well as the Naskapi village municipality of Kawawachikamach. The Cree village Whapmagoostui, on the eastern shore of Hudson Bay, is an enclave and does not participate in the Kativik Regional Government.
- Jamésie: the four towns of Jamésie are not covered by a regional government, and supply their own services. It surrounds but does not administer the towns of Chibougamau, Chapais, Lebel-sur-Quévillon, and Matagami, as well as the unconstituted localities of Radisson, Valcanton, and Villebois.
- Eeyou Istchee James Bay Regional Government, offers regional services to its nine Cree village municipalities and their associated reserved lands. It an uncontiguous territory enclaved within Jamésie.

=== Metropolitan communities ===
Metropolitan communities have responsibility for areas of common interest to their constituent municipalities such as urban planning, economic development, promotion of international trade, artistic and cultural development, public transportation and waste management. Each CM also has specific areas of jurisdiction defined by the legislation governing it.

There are two metropolitan communities or CMs in Quebec:

- The Communauté métropolitaine de Montréal comprises 82 municipalities, encompassing four RCMs and parts of another six RCMs. The council is chaired by the mayor of Montreal. The CMM contains four RCMs and overlaps with six.
- The Quebec City metropolitan community consists of the Agglomoration of Quebec (containing four municipalities which do not belong to an RCM, and the municipalities in the RCMs of L'Île-d'Orleans parts of La Côte-de-Beaupré and La Jacques-Cartier. The council is chaired by the mayor of Quebec City.

== Other divisions of the province ==
=== Administrative regions ===
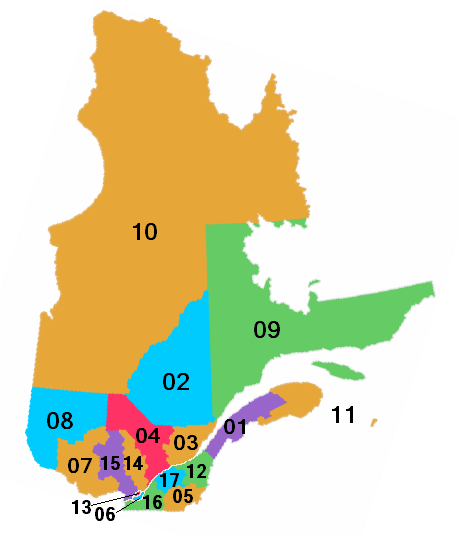
The seventeen administrative regions of Quebec.

There are 17 administrative regions of Quebec. They have no government, but serve to organize the provision of provincial services. They are:

- 01 Bas-Saint-Laurent
- 02 Saguenay–Lac-Saint-Jean
- 03 Capitale-Nationale
- 04 Mauricie
- 05 Estrie
- 06 Montréal
- 07 Outaouais
- 08 Abitibi-Témiscamingue
- 09 Côte-Nord
- 10 Nord-du-Québec
- 11 Gaspésie–Îles-de-la-Madeleine
- 12 Chaudière-Appalaches
- 13 Laval
- 14 Lanaudière
- 15 Laurentides
- 16 Montérégie
- 17 Centre-du-Québec

=== Census areas ===
Statistics Canada divides the province into census divisions, designated places, population centres, and economic regions.

=== Health authorities ===
The Ministry of Health and Social Services serves 18 health regions.

=== Protected areas ===
- Federally-protected areas include Forillon National Park, La Mauricie National Park, Mingan Archipelago National Park Reserve, Saguenay–St. Lawrence Marine Park, and the national historic site of Grosse-Île-et-le-Mémorial-des-Irlandais, National Wildlife Areas, migratory bird sanctuaries, and Gatineau Park.
- Provincially-run areas include 24 provincial parks, ecological reserves, exceptional forest ecosystems, and biodiversity reserves.
- Quebec has a natural world heritage site, Miguasha National Park.

=== Reserves ===
There are federally-administrated Indian reserves, as well as northern villages and Inuit reserved lands, and Cree and Naskapi territories.

=== Canadian Forces bases ===
Canadian Forces bases in the province include CFB Valcartier, Proof and Experimental Test Establishment, CFB Montreal, and CFB Bagotville.

=== Historical counties ===
Quebec was divided into counties until the early 1980s when they were dissolved and the province was divided into regional county municipalities.

The Eastern Townships was an administrative region in southeastern Quebec. Since 1987, most of the area is within the administrative region Estrie, and the term Eastern Townships is now used in tourist literature.

=== Judicial districts ===
The province is divided into 36 judicial districts.

== See also ==
- Lists of entities: boroughs, communities, municipalities, parish municipalities, towns, township municipalities, united township municipalities, unorganized territories, village municipalities, regional county municipalities
- Ministry of Municipal Affairs and Housing
- 21st-century municipal history of Quebec
- Municipal reorganization in Quebec
