= Grosse-Île, Quebec =

Grosse-Île
- Municipality
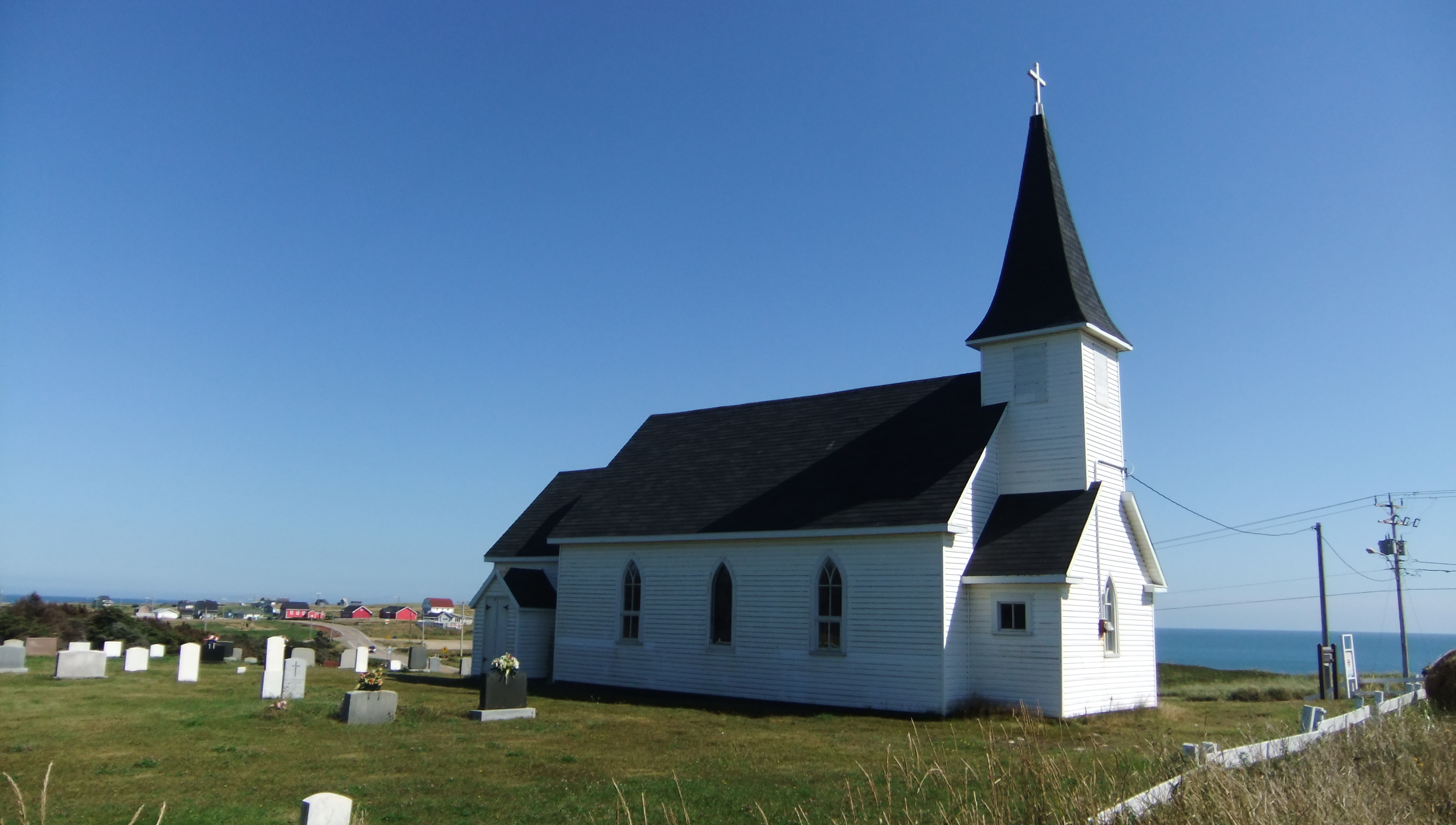
- Saint Peter's By the Sea, Old Harry, Grosse-Île

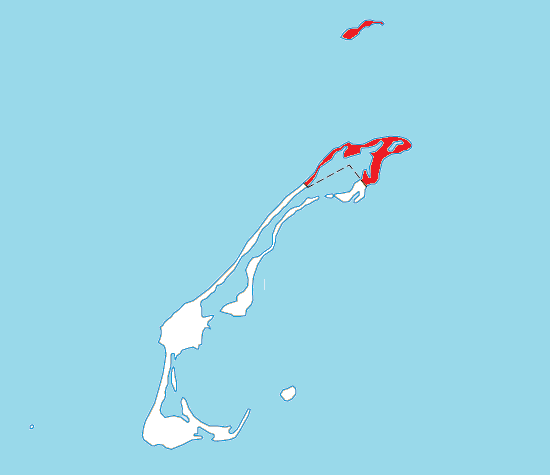
- Location within Les Îles-de-la-Madeleine TE.

- Location in eastern Quebec.
- Coordinates: 47°37′N 61°31′W
- Country: Canada
- Province: Quebec
- Region: Gaspésie–Îles-de-la-Madeleine
- RCM: None
- Agglomeration: Îles-de-la-Madeleine
- Constituted: January 1, 2006

Government
  - Mayor: Gordon Burke
  - Federal riding: Gaspésie—Les Îles-de-la-Madeleine—Listuguj
  - Prov. riding: Îles-de-la-Madeleine

Area
  - Total: 96.60 km^{2} (37.30 sq mi)
  - Land: 32.28 km^{2} (12.46 sq mi)

Population (2021)
  - Total: 464
  - Density: 14.4/km^{2} (37/sq mi)
  - Pop 2016-2021: ▼0.2%
  - Dwellings: 252
- Time zone: UTC−5 (EST)
  - Summer (DST): UTC−4 (EDT)
- Postal code(s): G4T 6B9
- Area codes: 418 and 581
- Highways: R-199
- Website: www.mungi.ca

Grosse-Île (French pronunciation: [ɡʁos il], lit. 'Big Island') is one of two municipalities forming the urban agglomeration of Îles-de-la-Madeleine in Quebec, Canada. It is part of the Gaspésie–Îles-de-la-Madeleine region, and its population was 464 as of the 2021 Census.

== History ==
As part of a municipal reorganization across Quebec, the seven communities (Fatima, Grande-Entrée, Grosse-Île, Havre-aux-Maisons, L'Étang-du-Nord, Havre-Aubert, and Cap-aux-Meules) of the Magdalen Islands amalgamated to form the municipality of Les Îles-de-la-Madeleine on January 1, 2002. However, after a 2004 referendum, Grosse-Île decided to split from the municipality, effective January 1, 2006.

Located on Grosse-Île island (French for Big Island) between the villages of Grande-Entrée (south) and House Harbour (southwest), it was settled during the late 18th century by Scots. French-speaking people would come and establish themselves just after, as seen by a Catholic parish founded in 1793.

Old Harry is a hamlet and fishing village located within the municipal boundaries of Grosse-Île, which lies at the junction of Île de la Grande Ouverte and Île de l'Est. It was first mapped by Joseph Frederick Wallet Des Barres (1769 and 1776) and later by Admiral Henry Wolsey Bayfield (1837), where the name was recorded as Old Harry Head. The toponym derives from Scotsman Harry Clarke, who was for many years the only occupant of the cape (or head). Many of his descendants still bear the surname Clarke.

== Geography ==
Grosse-Ile and Entry Island are the two communities where English is the main language spoken, in the field and at sea, the age-old and daily exchanges have created and still create close relationships between the English- and French-speaking communities and individuals of the archipelago.

== Demography ==
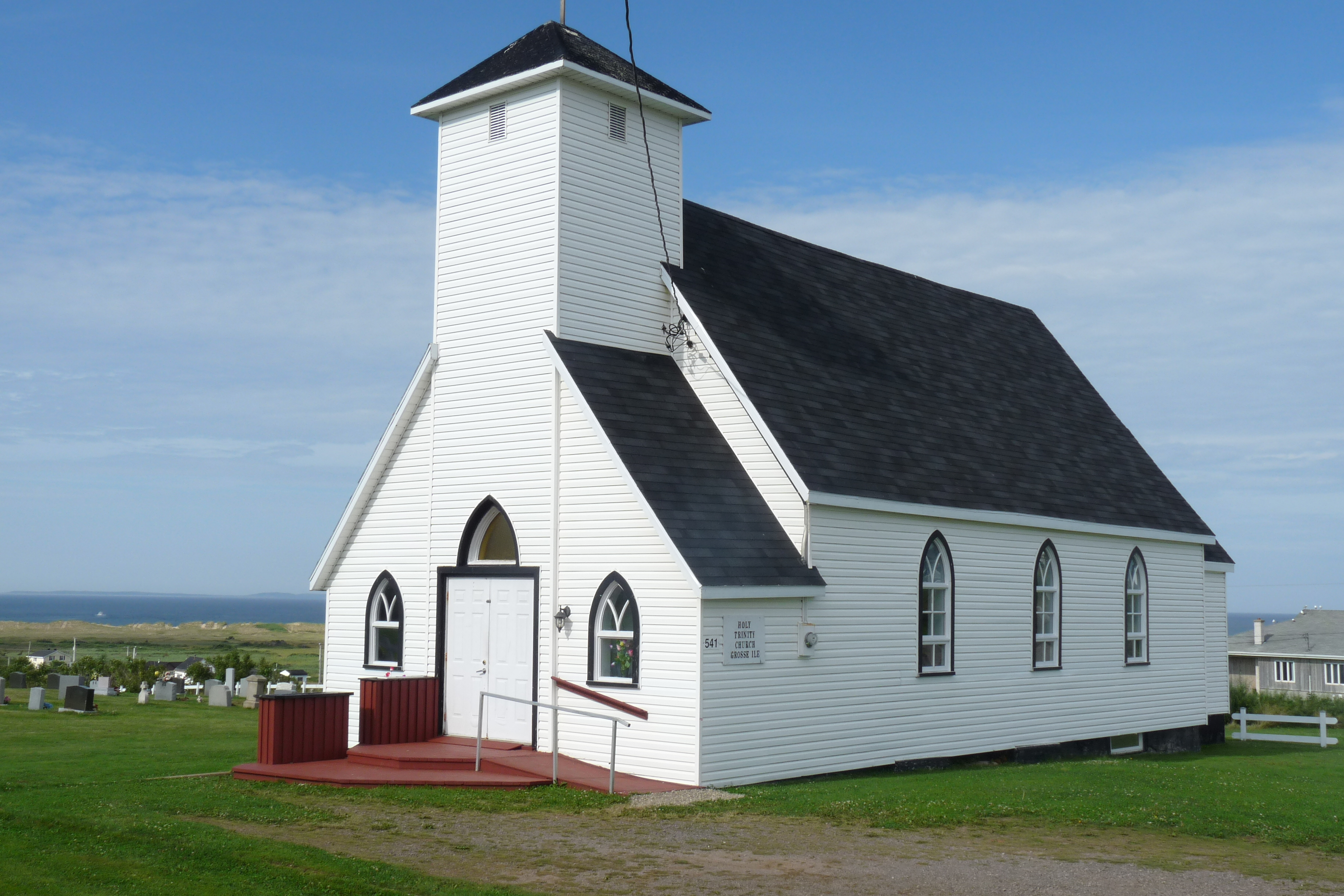
Grosse-Île Church

=== Population ===
Canada census – Grosse-Île community profile

	2021	2016	2011
Population	464 (-0.2% from 2016)	465 (-5.1% from 2011)	490 (-7.7% from 2006)
Land area	32.28 km^{2} (12.46 sq mi)	37.59 km^{2} (14.51 sq mi)	37.29 km^{2} (14.40 sq mi)
Population density	14.4/km^{2} (37/sq mi)	12.4/km^{2} (32/sq mi)	13.1/km^{2} (34/sq mi)
Median age	52.0 (M: 52.8, F: 51.6)	49.1 (M: 50.0, F: 48.9)	43.8 (M: 43.6, F: 44.0)
Private dwellings	252 (total) 220 (occupied)	254 (total)	229 (total)
Median household income	$86,000	$81,152	$.N/A

Notes: 2011 income data for this area has been suppressed for data quality or confidentiality reasons.
References: 2021 2016 2011

Historical Census Data - Grosse-Île, Quebec

Year	Pop.	±%
1901	624	—
1911	695	+11.4%
1921	767	+10.4%
1931	308	−59.8%
1941	281	−8.8%
1951	373	+32.7%
1956	388	+4.0%
1961	451	+16.2%
1966	487	+8.0%
1971	475	−2.5%

Year	Pop.	±%
1976	500	+5.3%
1981	532	+6.4%
1986	560	+5.3%
1991	569	+1.6%
1996	567	−0.4%
2001	543	−4.2%
2006	531	−2.2%
2011	490	−7.7%
2016	465	−5.1%
2021	464	−0.2%

=== Language ===
Canada Census Mother Tongue - Grosse-Île, Quebec
Census	Total	French			English			French & English			Other		
Year	Responses	Count	Trend	Pop %	Count	Trend	Pop %	Count	Trend	Pop %	Count	Trend	Pop %
2021	465	65	▲8.3%	14.0%	380	▼3.8%	81.7%	15	▲200.0%	3.2%	0	▼100.0%	0.0%
2016	465	60	▲20.0%	12.9%	395	▼8.1%	85.0%	5	▼50.0%	1.1%	5	▲ n/a	1.1%
2011	490	50	▲100.0%	10.2%	430	▼14.9%	87.8%	10	▲ n/a%	2.0%	0	0.0%	0.0%
2006	530	25	▼66.7%	4.7%	505	▲9.8%	95.3%	0	0.0%	0.0%	0	0.0%	0.0%
2001	535	75	▲25.0%	14.0%	460	▼8.0%	86.0%	0	▼100.0%	0.0%	0	0.0%	0.0%
1996	570	60	n/a	10.5%	500	n/a	87.7%	10	n/a	1.8%	0	n/a	0.0%

== Economy ==
Quebec's only salt mine is located on Grosse Île, and is operated by Seleine Mines, which is owned by Windsor Salt.

In 1972, the Société Québécoise d’Exploration Minière (SOQUEM) discovered 7 salt domes, including the one at Grosse-Île. In 1982, after investments of C$125 million, Seleine Mines inaugurated an active underground mine on Grosse Île. In 1988, the company was sold to the Canadian Salt Company (Windsor), and in 2009, the mine passed into the hands of the German group K+S and later to Stone Canyon Industries.

About 150 people work at Seleine Mines, and every year, more than 1,300,000 t (1,300,000 long tons; 1,400,000 short tons) metric tons of salt are extracted there, this salt is used for road deicing.

== Attractions ==
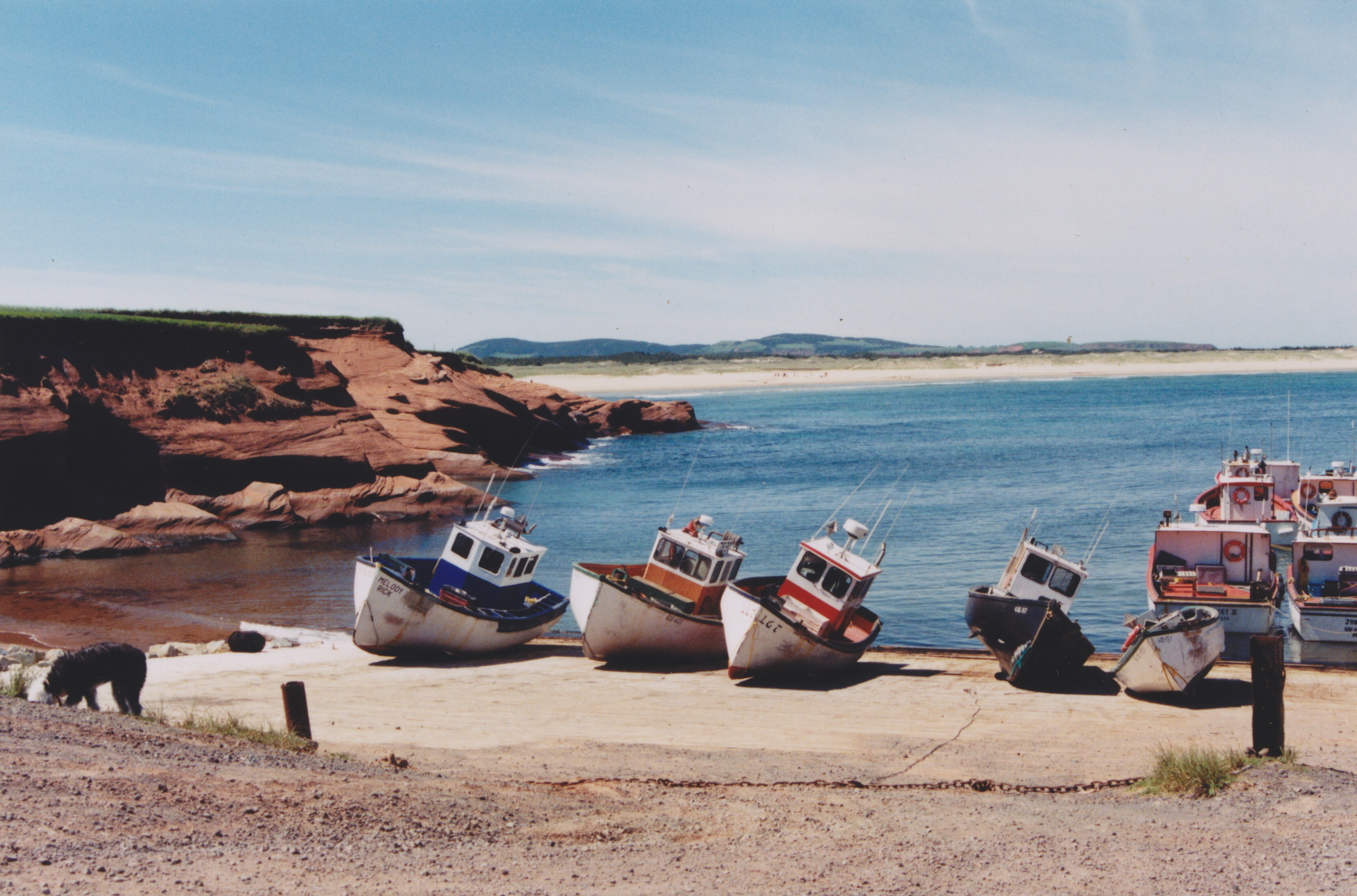
Old-Harry (Hamlet), in port, 5 boats pulled on the wood-covered beach (slips) 1996

The Grande Échourie Beach (Former name Old-Harry Beach) stretches over 9 km between Old Harry Point and East Point where is located the Pointe de l'Est National Wildlife Area, with its unique maritime environment, the area is currently used by more than 150 bird species and 10 or so mammal species.' The Pointe de l'Est National Wildlife Area is located on La Grosse Île, the reserve occupies an area of 748 hectares of the village of Grosse-Île territory's

The hamlet of Old-Harry is located on the point of the same name, in the municipality of Grosse-Île, at the junction of Île de la Grande Entrée and Île de l'Est.

== See also ==
- List of anglophone communities in Quebec
- List of municipalities in Quebec
