= Urban agglomeration of Rivière-Rouge =

Administrative division in Quebec, Canada

The Urban agglomeration of Riviére-Rouge is an urban agglomeration in Quebec that consists of:

- the city of Rivière-Rouge
- the municipality of La Macaza

== History ==
As part of the 2000–2006 municipal reorganization in Quebec, the City of Rivière-Rouge was created on December 18, 2002 by the merger of the villages of L'Annonciation and Sainte-Véronique and the municipalities of Marchand and La Macaza. Following a 2004 referendum La Macaza de-merged and became an independent municipality again on January 1, 2006.

However, the legislation governing the de-merger process provided for the creation of a new municipal structure, an urban agglomeration, which would continue to tie de-merged cities to their former partners for the provision of various municipal services.

== See also ==
- Urban agglomerations in Quebec
- 21st-century municipal history of Quebec
