= Urban agglomerations in Quebec =

Type of administrative division in Québec, Canada

An agglomeration, or urban agglomeration, is an administrative division of Quebec consisting of a number of municipalities. One municipality in each agglomeration is known as the "central municipality" and has special status; the others are known as "related municipalities".

== Definition ==
The Act Respecting the Exercise of Certain Municipal Powers in Certain Urban Agglomerations 2004 (CQLR c E-20.001, formerly RSQ, c E-20.001) defines the expression "urban agglomeration" as follows:

An urban agglomeration corresponds to the territory, as it exists on 17 December 2004, of Ville de Montréal, Ville de Québec, Ville de Longueuil, Ville de Mont-Laurier, Ville de La Tuque, Municipalité des Îles-de-la-Madeleine, Ville de Sainte-Agathe-des-Monts, Ville de Mont-Tremblant, Ville de Cookshire-Eaton, Ville de Rivière-Rouge or Ville de Sainte-Marguerite–Estérel.

One municipality in each agglomeration is known as the "central municipality" and has special status under the Act. The other municipalities are called "related municipalities".

The Act defines the powers exercised by the agglomeration and those exercised by the municipalities, known respectively as "agglomeration powers" (compétences d'agglomération) and "local powers" (compétences de proximité).

== History ==
Between 2000 and 2003, Quebec's provincial government merged many small municipalities into larger "super-cities". This municipal reorganisation proved to be controversial in several municipalities.

A new liberal government elected in 2003 held a referendum to allow voters to vote for de-amalgamation. Several municipalities voted in a 2004 referendum to reverse their amalgamation. However, the new municipalities did not fully regain their old autonomy. Urban agglomerations were introduced over each formerly-merged region, grouping together a number of municipalities that were abolished as independent entities on 1 January 2002 but reconstituted on 1 January 2006.

These municipalities were required to share major services, such as police, transit, and water, under an agglomeration council, in most cases controlled by the central municipality.

== Agglomeration and municipal powers ==
Urban agglomerations have certain powers that would ordinarily be exercised by individual municipalities.

Agglomeration powers are exercised by "agglomeration councils" (conseils d'agglomération). These powers are defined by statute and many are performed by the central municipality in each agglomeration. For example, the Montreal city police (SPVM) has jurisdiction in the neighbouring communities.

Some powers are shared, for example, regarding public transport. While other powers are reserved to the municipalities. This can lead to some fragmentation with Montreal and Quebec City, for example, said to have up to 5 levels of local government.

== List of constituent municipalities ==
For each agglomeration, the legally designated central municipality appears first.

- Urban agglomeration of Montreal (administered by the Montreal Agglomeration Council)
  - Ville de Montréal
  - Ville de Baie-D'Urfé
  - Ville de Beaconsfield
  - Ville de Côte Saint-Luc
  - Ville de Dollard-Des-Ormeaux
  - Ville de Dorval
  - Ville de Hampstead
  - Ville de Kirkland
  - Ville de L'Île-Dorval
  - Ville de Montréal-Est
  - Ville de Montréal-Ouest
  - Ville de Mont-Royal
  - Ville de Pointe-Claire
  - Ville de Sainte-Anne-de-Bellevue
  - Village de Senneville
  - Ville de Westmount
- Urban agglomeration of Quebec City
  - Ville de Québec
  - Ville de L'Ancienne-Lorette
  - Ville de Saint-Augustin-de-Desmaures
- Urban agglomeration of Longueuil
  - Ville de Longueuil
  - Ville de Boucherville
  - Ville de Brossard
  - Ville de Saint-Bruno-de-Montarville
  - Ville de Saint-Lambert
- Urban agglomeration of Mont-Laurier
  - Ville de Mont-Laurier
  - Municipalité de Saint-Aimé-du-Lac-des-Îles
- Urban agglomeration of La Tuque
  - Ville de La Tuque
  - Municipalité de La Bostonnais
  - Municipalité de Lac-Édouard
- Urban agglomeration of Les Îles-de-la-Madeleine
  - Municipalité des Îles-de-la-Madeleine
  - Municipalité de Grosse-Île
- Urban agglomeration of Sainte-Agathe-des-Monts
  - Ville de Sainte-Agathe-des-Monts
  - Municipalité d'Ivry-sur-le-Lac
- Urban agglomeration of Mont-Tremblant
  - Ville de Mont-Tremblant
  - Municipalité de Lac-Tremblant-Nord
- Urban agglomeration of Cookshire-Eaton
  - Ville de Cookshire-Eaton
  - Municipalité de Newport
- Urban agglomeration of Rivière-Rouge
  - Ville de Rivière-Rouge
  - Municipalité de La Macaza
- Urban agglomeration of Sainte-Marguerite–Estérel
  - Ville de Sainte-Marguerite-du-Lac-Masson
  - Ville d'Estérel

== See also ==
- Local government in Quebec
- Municipal reorganization in Quebec
- Metropolitan Community (Quebec)
- Sancton, Andrew; Young, Robert Andrew (2009-01-01). Foundations of Governance: Municipal Government in Canada's Provinces. University of Toronto Press. pp. 81-89. ISBN 978-0-8020-9709-5.
