= L'Ancienne-Lorette =

- City
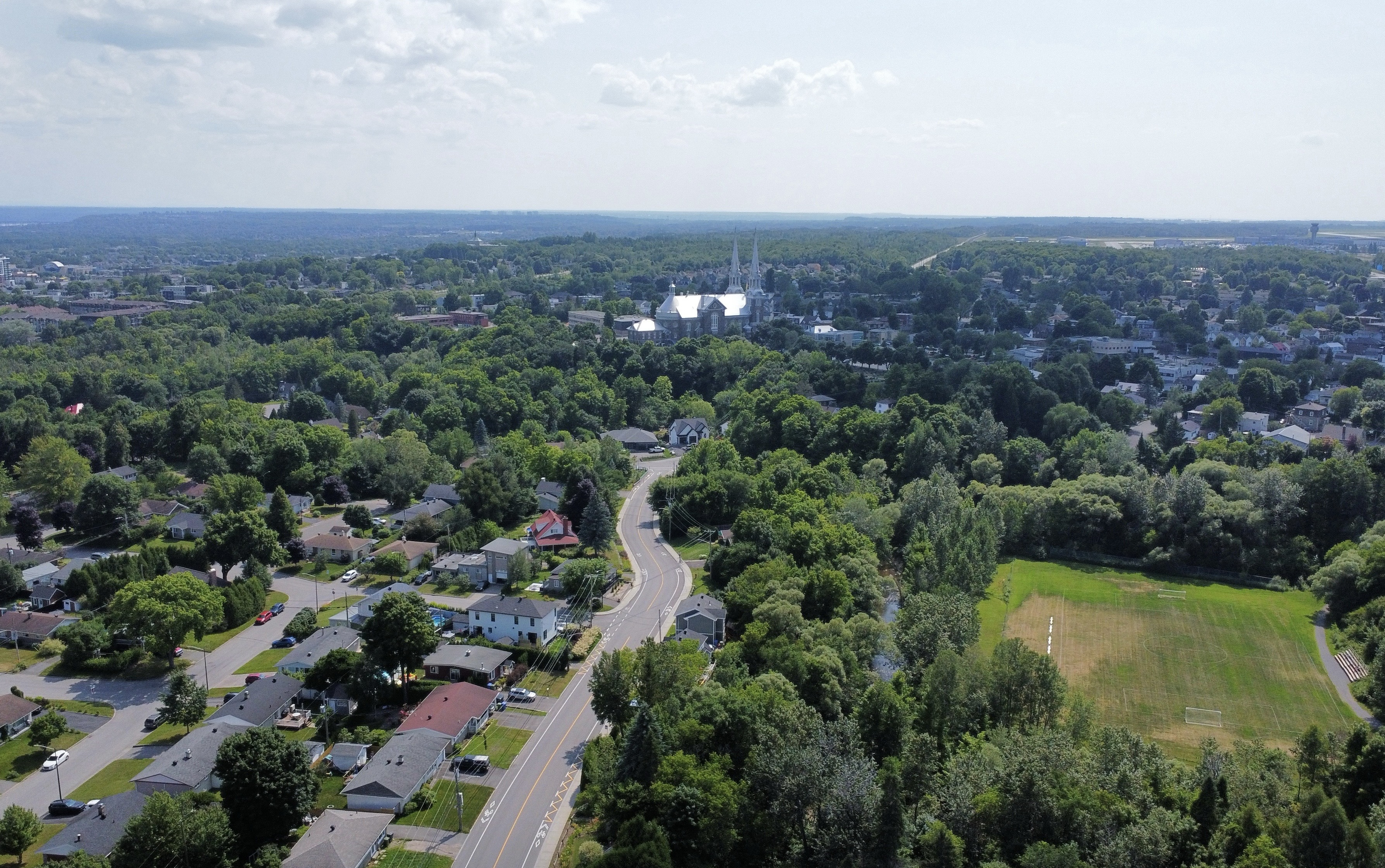

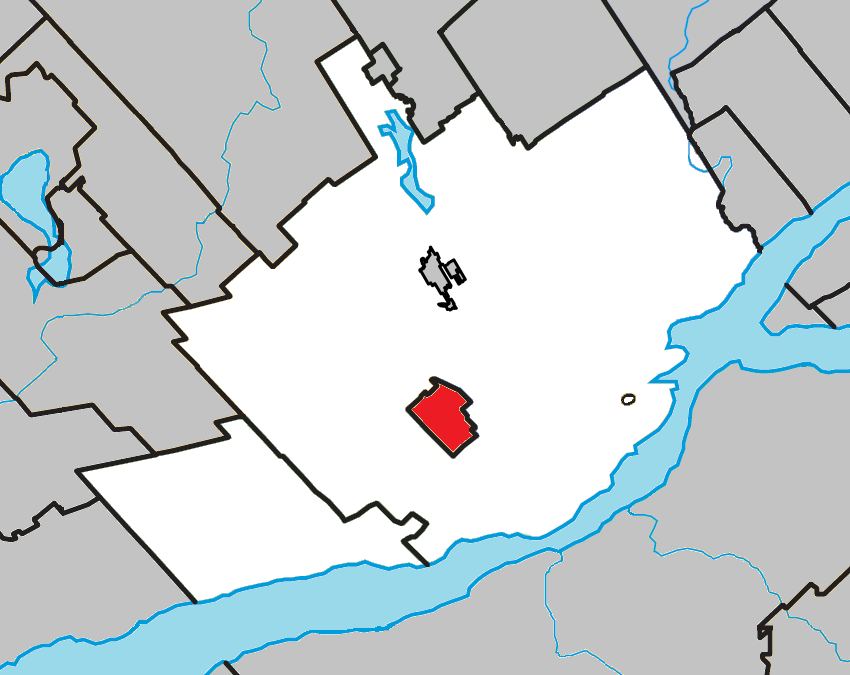
- Location within Quebec TE.

- Location in central Quebec
- Coordinates: 46°47′55″N 71°21′45″W
- Country: Canada
- Province: Quebec
- Region: Capitale-Nationale
- RCM: None
- Agglomeration: Quebec City
- Settled: 1674
- Constituted: January 1, 2006

Government
  - Mayor: Gaétan Pageau
  - Federal riding: Louis-Saint-Laurent—Akiawenhrahk
  - Prov. riding: La Peltrie

Area
  - Total: 7.70 km^{2} (2.97 sq mi)
  - Land: 7.72 km^{2} (2.98 sq mi)

Population (2021)
  - Total: 16,970
  - Density: 2,197/km^{2} (5,690/sq mi)
  - Pop 2016-2021: ▲2.6%
  - Dwellings: 7,516
- Time zone: UTC−5 (EST)
  - Summer (DST): UTC−4 (EDT)
- Postal code(s): G2E
- Area codes: 418 and 581
- Highways: R-138
- Website: www.lancienne-lorette.org

L'Ancienne-Lorette (French pronunciation: [lɑ̃sjɛn lɔʁɛt]) is a city in central Quebec, Canada. It is a suburb of and an enclave within Quebec City. It was merged with Quebec City on January 1, 2002, as part of a 2000–2006 municipal reorganization in Quebec, but, after a 2004 referendum, it was reconstituted as a separate city on January 1, 2006.

Its history dates to 1674, when a group of Wendat (Huron) fleeing war with the Haudenosaunee settled there under the protection of the French. It was founded as a mission village by the Jesuits. The Wyandot left after a few decades, and French settlers took over the land.

== History ==
The Jesuit missionary Pierre Chaumonot in 1674 founded a settlement here when he built a chapel for the Wendat (Huron). Following his third and final trip to the shrine of Loreto in Italy, Chaumonot was cured of a terrible headache. In gratitude, he placed the colony under the patronage of Our Lady of the Annunciation, but it is still commonly called Lorette.

In 1697, the Wendat left the village in search of better land for hunting and fishing. Afterward the site became known in French as Vieille-Lorette ("Old Loreto") or Ancienne-Lorette ("Former Loreto"). A new location became known as Nouvelle-Lorette ("New Loreto") or Jeune-Lorette ("Young Loreto"). That site roughly corresponds to the Loretteville of today. A year later in 1698, the Parish of Notre-Dame-de-l'Annonciation was established.

In 1948, the place was incorporated as the village municipality of Notre-Dame-de-Lorette. In 1967, it gained town status and took back its original name, L'Ancienne-Lorette, to distinguish itself from the Notre-Dame-de-Lorette Lac-Saint-Jean region.

Until 1971, L'Ancienne-Lorette was the gateway to Quebec's International Airport. It used to be known as L'Ancienne-Lorette Airport. In 1971 the rural section of the town that included the airport was annexed by Sainte-Foy.

On January 1, 2002, L'Ancienne-Lorette was merged with Quebec City as part of a province-wide municipal reorganization and became part of the Laurentien borough of that city. After a 2004 referendum, it regained independent city status on January 1, 2006.

== Demographics ==
In the 2021 Census of Population conducted by Statistics Canada, L'Ancienne-Lorette had a population of 16,970 living in 7,314 of its 7,516 total private dwellings, a change of 2.6% from its 2016 population of 16,543. With a land area of 7.72 km^{2} (2.98 sq mi), it had a population density of 2,198.2/km^{2} (5,693.3/sq mi) in 2021.

According to the Canada 2021 Census:

- Population: 16,970
- % Change (2016–2021): +2.6
- Private dwellings occupied by usual residents: 7,314 (total dwellings: 7,516)
- Area (km^{2}): 7.72 km^{2}
- Density (persons per km^{2}): 2,197.0
- Mother tongue:
  - English as first language: 1.1%
  - French as first language: 94.2%
  - English and French as first language: 0.8%
  - Other as first language: 3.5%

Population trend:

- Population in 2021: 16,970 (2006 to 2011 population change: 2.6%)
- Population in 2016: 16,543
- Population in 2011: 16,745
- Population in 2006: 16,516
- Population in 2001: 15,929
- Population in 1996: 15,895
- Population in 1991: 15,242
- Population in 1986: 13,747
- Population in 1981: 12,935
- Population in 1976: 11,694
- Population in 1971: 8,304
- Population in 1966: 5,691
- Population in 1961: 3,961
- Population in 1956: 3,464
- Population in 1951: 2,516

In 2021, L'Ancienne-Lorette was 94.3% White, 1.6% Black, 1.2% Latin American and 1% Arab.

== Economy ==
Quebecair Express, prior to its disestablishment, had its headquarters in the city.

== Notable people ==
- Félix Auger-Aliassime (raised in L'Ancienne-Lorette), Canadian professional tennis player, junior singles and doubles US Open champion
- Patrice Bergeron, retired NHL hockey centre
- Mario Marois, NHL defenceman, principally for the Quebec Nordiques
- Antoine Plamondon (ca. 1804–1895), artist
- Évelyne Viens, Olympic gold medal-winning soccer player

== See also ==
- Wendat Nation
- Wendake, Quebec
