= Saint-Augustin-de-Desmaures =

- City
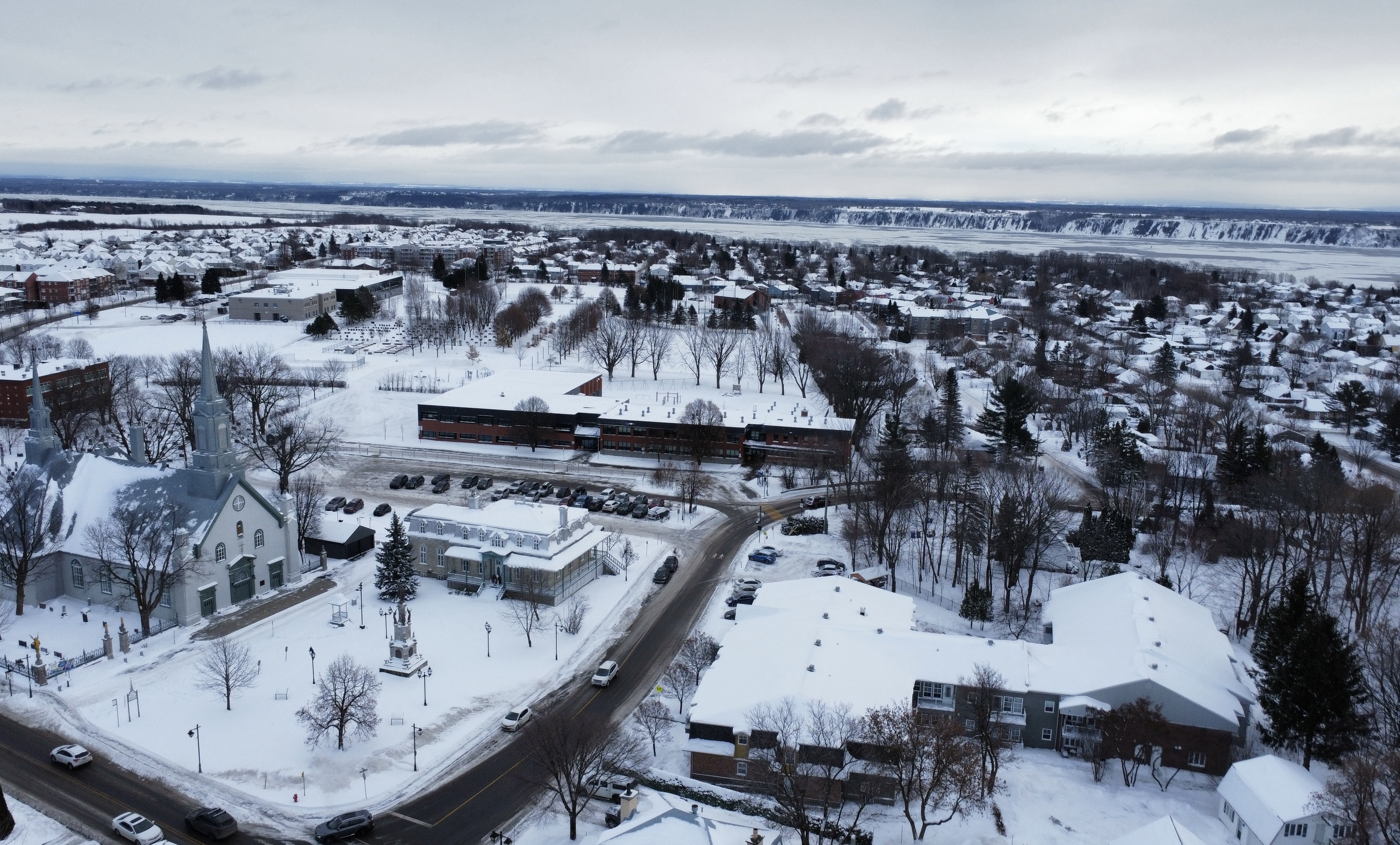

- Coat of arms

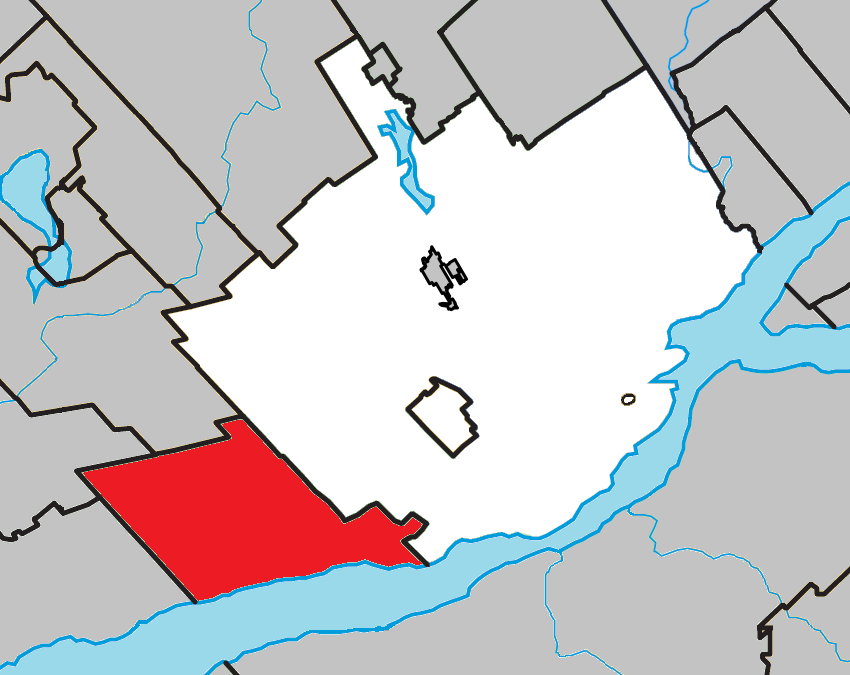
- Location within Quebec TE.

- Location in central Quebec
- Coordinates: 46°44′N 71°28′W
- Country: Canada
- Province: Quebec
- Region: Capitale-Nationale
- RCM: None
- Agglomeration: Quebec City
- Settled: 1679
- Constituted: January 1, 2006

Government
  - Mayor: Sylvain Juneau
  - MP: Joël Godin (C)
  - MNA: Marcos Archambault (C)

Area
  - Total: 105.00 km^{2} (40.54 sq mi)
  - Land: 85.80 km^{2} (33.13 sq mi)

Population (2021)
  - Total: 19,907
  - Density: 232/km^{2} (600/sq mi)
  - Pop 2016-2021: ▲5.8%
  - Dwellings: 8,453
- Time zone: UTC−5 (EST)
  - Summer (DST): UTC−4 (EDT)
- Postal code(s): G3A
- Area codes: 418 and 581
- Highways A-40: R-138; R-358; R-367
- Website: www.ville. st-augustin.qc.ca

Saint-Augustin-de-Desmaures (French pronunciation: [sɛ̃t‿oɡystɛ̃ də demɔʁ]) is a city in central Quebec, Canada, on the Saint Lawrence River, adjacent to Quebec City.

The town was founded in 1691 by three families (Desroches, Racette, Couture). It was merged with Quebec City on January 1, 2002 as part of the 2000–2006 municipal reorganization in Quebec and became part of the Laurentien borough of that city. However, together with various other former municipalities in the Province, after a 2004 referendum it was re-established as a separate city on January 1, 2006.

The local post office was previously named Saint-Augustin-de-Portneuf from 1852, then Saint-Augustin-de-Québec from 1918 until this was renamed to the community's current name in 1986.

== Demographics ==
In the 2021 Census of Population conducted by Statistics Canada, Saint-Augustin-de-Desmaures had a population of 19,907 living in 8,143 of its 8,453 total private dwellings, a change of 5.8% from its 2016 population of 18,820. With a land area of 85.8 km^{2} (33.1 sq mi), it had a population density of 232.0/km^{2} (600.9/sq mi) in 2021.

Population trend:

- Population in 2021: 19,907 (2016 to 2021 population change: 5.8%)
- Population in 2016: 18,820
- Population in 2011: 18,141
- Population in 2006: 17,281
- Population in 2001: 15,732
- Population in 1996: 14,771
- Population in 1991: 12,680

Mother tongue:

- English as first language: 1.1%
- French as first language: 97.5%
- English and French as first language: 0.2%
- Other as first language: 1.2%

In 2006, Saint-Augustin-de-Desmaures was 98.0% White, 0.5% Aboriginal, and 1.5% Visible Minorities.

== Notable people ==
- Sabrina Duchesne, Paralympic swimmer

== See also ==
- Municipal reorganization in Quebec
