= Urban agglomeration of Mont-Laurier =

Administrative division in Quebec, Canada

The Urban agglomeration of Mont-Laurier is an urban agglomeration in Quebec that consists of:

- the city of Mont-Laurier
- the municipality of Saint-Aimé-du-Lac-des-Îles

== History ==
As part of the 2000–2006 municipal reorganization in Quebec, the City of Mont-Laurier was created on January 8, 2003, by the merger of the city of Mont-Laurier, the municipality of Des Ruisseaux, and the municipality of Saint-Aimé-du-Lac-des-Îles. Following a 2004 referendum Saint-Aimé-du-Lac-des-Îles de-merged and became an independent municipality again on January 1, 2006.

However, the legislation governing the de-merger process provided for the creation of a new municipal structure, an urban agglomeration, which would continue to tie de-merged cities to their former partners for the provision of various municipal services.

== See also ==
- Urban agglomerations in Quebec
- 21st-century municipal history of Quebec
