= Capitale-Nationale =

Administrative region of Quebec, Canada

- Administrative region
- Coordinates: 47°20′N 71°30′W
- Country: Canada
- Province: Québec
- Regional County Municipalities (RCM) and Equivalent Territories (ET): 6 RCM, 1 ET: Charlevoix; Charlevoix-Est; La Côte-de-Beaupré; L'Île-d'Orléans; La Jacques-Cartier; Portneuf; Agglomeration of Quebec City (ET)

Government
  - Forum des élus de la région de la Capitale-Nationale (Regional conference of elected officers): Jean Fortin (President)

Area
  - Land: 18,684.78 km^{2} (7,214.23 sq mi)

Population (2021)
  - Total: 757,950
  - Density: 40.6/km^{2} (105/sq mi)
- Time zone: UTC−05:00 (EST)
  - Summer (DST): UTC−04:00 (EDT)
- Postal code prefix: G
- Area codes: 418, 581
- Website: www.mamh.gouv.qc.ca/organisation-municipale/organisation-territoriale/regions-administratives/capitale-nationale/

Capitale-Nationale (French pronunciation: [kapital nɑsjɔnal]; English: National Capital region) is one of the 17 administrative regions of Quebec. It is anchored by the provincial capital, Quebec City, and is largely coextensive with that city's metropolitan area. It has a land area of 18,684.78 km^{2}. It reported a total resident population of 757,950 as of the 2021 Canadian census, with Quebec City having 77.7 percent of the total.

It was established in 1966 as one of the original administrative regions of Quebec. Prior to January 2000, it was known as the Québec administrative region.

== Administrative divisions ==
=== Regional county municipalities ===
Regional County Municipality (RCM)	Population 2021 Canadian census	Land Area	Density (pop. per km^{2})	Seat of RCM
Charlevoix	13,371	3,736.80 km^{2} (1,442.79 sq mi)	3.6	Baie-Saint-Paul
Charlevoix-Est	15,409	2,288.97 km^{2} (883.78 sq mi)	6.7	Clermont
La Côte-de-Beaupré	30,240	4,845.19 km^{2} (1,870.74 sq mi)	6.2	Château-Richer
L'Île-d'Orléans	6,817	194.58 km^{2} (75.13 sq mi)	35.0	Sainte-Famille-de-l'Île-d'Orléans
La Jacques-Cartier	47,813	3,183.75 km^{2} (1,229.25 sq mi)	15.0	Shannon
Portneuf	55,523	3,887.88 km^{2} (1,501.12 sq mi)	14.3	Cap-Santé

=== Equivalent territory ===
Territory Equivalent to a RCM (TE)	Population Canada 2021 Census	Land Area	Density (pop. per km^{2})	Seat of RCM
Agglomeration of Quebec City	588,777	547.60 km^{2} (211.43 sq mi)	1,075.2	Quebec City

=== Independent parish municipality ===
- Notre-Dame-des-Anges

=== Native People's Reserve ===
- Wendake

== Major communities ==
- Baie-Saint-Paul
- Boischatel
- Donnacona
- L'Ancienne-Lorette
- La Malbaie
- Lac-Beauport
- Pont-Rouge
- Quebec City (Ville de Québec)
- Saint-Augustin-de-Desmaures
- Sainte-Brigitte-de-Laval
- Sainte-Catherine-de-la-Jacques-Cartier
- Saint-Raymond
- Shannon
- Stoneham-et-Tewkesbury

== School Districts ==
25 francophone districts managed by 5 school service centres:

- 5 of Commission scolaire de Charlevoix (Charlevoix and Charlevoix-Est).
- 5 of Commission scolaire des Découvreurs
- 5 of Commission scolaire de la Capitale
- 5 of Commission scolaire de Portneuf
- 5 of Commission scolaire des Premières-Seigneuries

Anglophone district:

- Central Quebec School Board

== See also ==
- List of Quebec regions
