= Rivière-Rouge =

- City

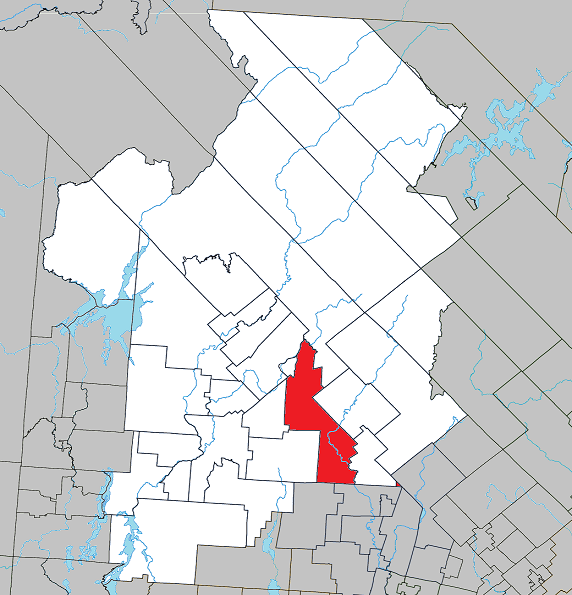
- Location within Antoine-Labelle RCM

- Location in central Quebec
- Coordinates: 46°25′N 74°52′W
- Country: Canada
- Province: Quebec
- Region: Laurentides
- RCM: Antoine-Labelle
- Constituted: December 18, 2002

Government
  - Mayor: Denis Lacasse
  - Federal riding: Laurentides—Labelle
  - Prov. riding: Labelle

Area
  - Total: 499.64 km^{2} (192.91 sq mi)
  - Land: 451.43 km^{2} (174.30 sq mi)

Population (2021)
  - Total: 4,631
  - Density: 10.3/km^{2} (27/sq mi)
  - Pop. 2016-2021: ▲7.1%
  - Dwellings: 3,082
- Time zone: UTC−5 (EST)
  - Summer (DST): UTC−4 (EDT)
- Postal code(s): J0T 1T0 & J0T 2X0
- Area code: 819
- Highways: R-117 (TCH); R-321
- Website: www.riviere-rouge.ca

Rivière-Rouge (French pronunciation: [ʁivjɛʁ ʁuʒ], lit. 'Red River') is a city located in the Antoine-Labelle Regional County Municipality, Quebec, Canada. The population as of the 2021 Canadian census was 4,631.

== History ==
As part of the 2000–2006 municipal reorganization in Quebec, the city was created on December 18, 2002 by the amalgamation of the villages of L'Annonciation, La Macaza, Sainte-Véronique, and Canton Marchand. After a referendum in 2004, La Macaza regained its independent status on January 1, 2006 but remains part of the Urban agglomeration of Rivière-Rouge. The urban agglomeration is responsible for managing aspects that are common to all municipalities that were once merged, examples are 911 service, public safety, recycling and many other city functions that were merged into the city. The original villages are now the sectors of L'Annonciation, Marchand, and Sainte-Véronique. Although the city is named Rivière-Rouge, most people still call each town by its historical name.

The city is named for Rouge River that runs through the area. It is a tributary of the Ottawa River (French: Rivière des Outaouais). The region was always known as La Vallée de la Rouge (English: The Valley of the Red), and the city name was probably chosen for this reason. The now defunct local Air Cadet Squadron number 883 was also called Rivière-Rouge.

The village of l'Annonciation was created in 1908 from the "Downtown" area of the municipality of Marchand, so in one sense it has been re-absorbed into the whole. The two municipalities had done many things in cooperation prior to the merger.

== Demographics ==
In the 2021 Census of Population conducted by Statistics Canada, Rivière-Rouge had a population of 4,631 living in 2,328 of its 3,082 total private dwellings, a change of 7.1% from its 2016 population of 4,322. With a land area of 451.43 km^{2} (174.30 sq mi), it had a population density of 10.3/km^{2} (26.6/sq mi) in 2021.

Canada census – Rivière-Rouge community profile

	2021	2016	2011
Population	4,631 (+7.1% from 2016)	4,322 (-7.0% from 2011)	4,645 (+11.9% from 2006)
Land area	451.43 km^{2} (174.30 sq mi)	455.65 km^{2} (175.93 sq mi)	455.35 km^{2} (175.81 sq mi)
Population density	10.3/km^{2} (27/sq mi)	9.5/km^{2} (25/sq mi)	10.2/km^{2} (26/sq mi)
Median age	58.0 (M: 58.0, F: 58.0)	55.7 (M: 56.1, F: 55.3)	52.2 (M: 52.8, F: 51.7)
Private dwellings	3,082 (total)	3,053 (total)	2,960 (total)
Median household income	$54,000	$45,163	$44,857

References: 2021 2016 2011

Historical census populations – Rivière-Rouge
Year	Pop.	±%
2006	4,625	—
2011	4,645	+0.4%
2016	4,322	−7.0%
2021	4,631	+7.1%
Source: Statistics Canada

=== Language ===
All official government actions take place in French, the official language of Quebec. French is the primary language spoken in Rivière-Rouge, though some people, especially those who deal often with tourists, are able to speak and understand English.

Mother tongue (2021):

- English as first language: 2.0%
- French as first language: 96.2%
- English and French as first language: 0.6%
- Other as first language: 0.9%

== Government ==
List of former mayors:

- Déborah Bélanger (2002–2017)
- Denis Charette (2017–2021)
- Denis Lacasse (2021–present)

== Economy ==
Society of commercial development. A commercial development corporation (SDC) operates on the territory of the city's downtown area and the village core of the Sainte-Véronique sector, its office being located in the L'Annonciation train station (1903). The SDC de Rivière-Rouge, formerly SIDAC de L'Annonciation, has been in existence since 1992 and has more than a hundred members.

In the summer of 2020, to revive the economy during the COVID-19 pandemic, the SDC joined the Committee for the Economic Recovery of Rivière-Rouge.

Rouge Economic Development Corporation (REDC) The Corporation de développement économique de la Rouge (CDER) is an economic development organization working on behalf of the agglomeration of Rivière-Rouge[30]. The organization is responsible for managing the FICDER (Fonds d'Investissement de la Corporation de Développement Économique de la Rouge) as well as the Rouge Valley Industrial Park located at the southernmost point of the City's territory.

Primary sector: Agriculture, along with forestry, was an economic driver for the region in the early stages of its development. In 2010, the area of the agricultural zone occupied 5% (2,145 ha) of the territory of Rivière-Rouge[8]. Also in 2010, 12 companies were registered with MAPAQ and they generated $5 million in gross revenues. 6 were oriented towards animal production (mainly beef cattle) and the other 6 were oriented towards crop production (largely forage). These companies alone occupied 1,119 ha, or 52% of the city's agricultural zone. Of these 1,119 ha, only 345 ha of the agricultural zone (31%) were cultivated. "Natural pastures" occupied 109 ha, "woodlands, maple syrup plantations and plantations" occupied 614 ha and 21 ha were considered as "Other uncultivated areas".

Forestry was also one of the economic engines of the region, but its importance has been declining for decades. Several sawmills have had to close their doors.

Secondary sector: The City of Red River has an industrial park[30] organized under the Rouge Economic Development Corporation. This industrial park is located at the southern entrance to the city. It has a total area of 320,000 m2 on sandy land. It is home to house and framing companies as well as the Rouge Environmental Complex (CER), formerly the Rouge Intermunicipal Waste Board (RIDR).

Tertiary sector: Air transport A seaplane base is located on the territory of the city of Rivière-Rouge. It is the head office of Air Mont-Laurier Outfitters and is located on Lake Tiberias.

The La Macaza-Mont-Tremblant International Airport is located 15 minutes from downtown Rivière-Rouge, very close to La Macaza and Lac Chaud in the neighbouring municipality (Municipalité de La Macaza) which is part of the agglomeration of Rivière-Rouge. The airport is more than 30 minutes from Mont Tremblant.

Tourism Activities such as fishing and the outdoors are popular in Rivière-Rouge[3]. The environment of Rivière-Rouge has several attractions that allow tourists and vacationers to practice activities; there are many lakes, a beach in the Sainte-Véronique sector, the Red River, campgrounds, outfitters, the Club de plein air les 6 cantons, the Kiamika Reservoir Regional Park, the P'tit train du Nord linear park, etc.

== Infrastructure ==
=== Transportation ===
The provincial government has over the years looked into creating a bypass of the Trans-Canada Highway Route 117 that runs through the L'Annonciation sector, in order to alleviate traffic problems caused by a combination of heavy truck traffic, heavy weekend tourist traffic and a main street that was not built for the amount of traffic. The currently planned new route would cut traffic in the downtown L'Annonciation area by an estimated 75%. The road would split off the current highway south of the village and pass the village to the west, and rejoin the main road just to the north near highway 321. There would also be one additional exchange built off the new highway, about halfway, that would join up to Montée Marois, a street in the center of the village where the only traffic light is. Much of the land acquisition surveying, and clearing has been undertaken over the past two years. It was expected to be completed by the end of 2009; as of 2011 is still under construction.

=== Hospitals ===
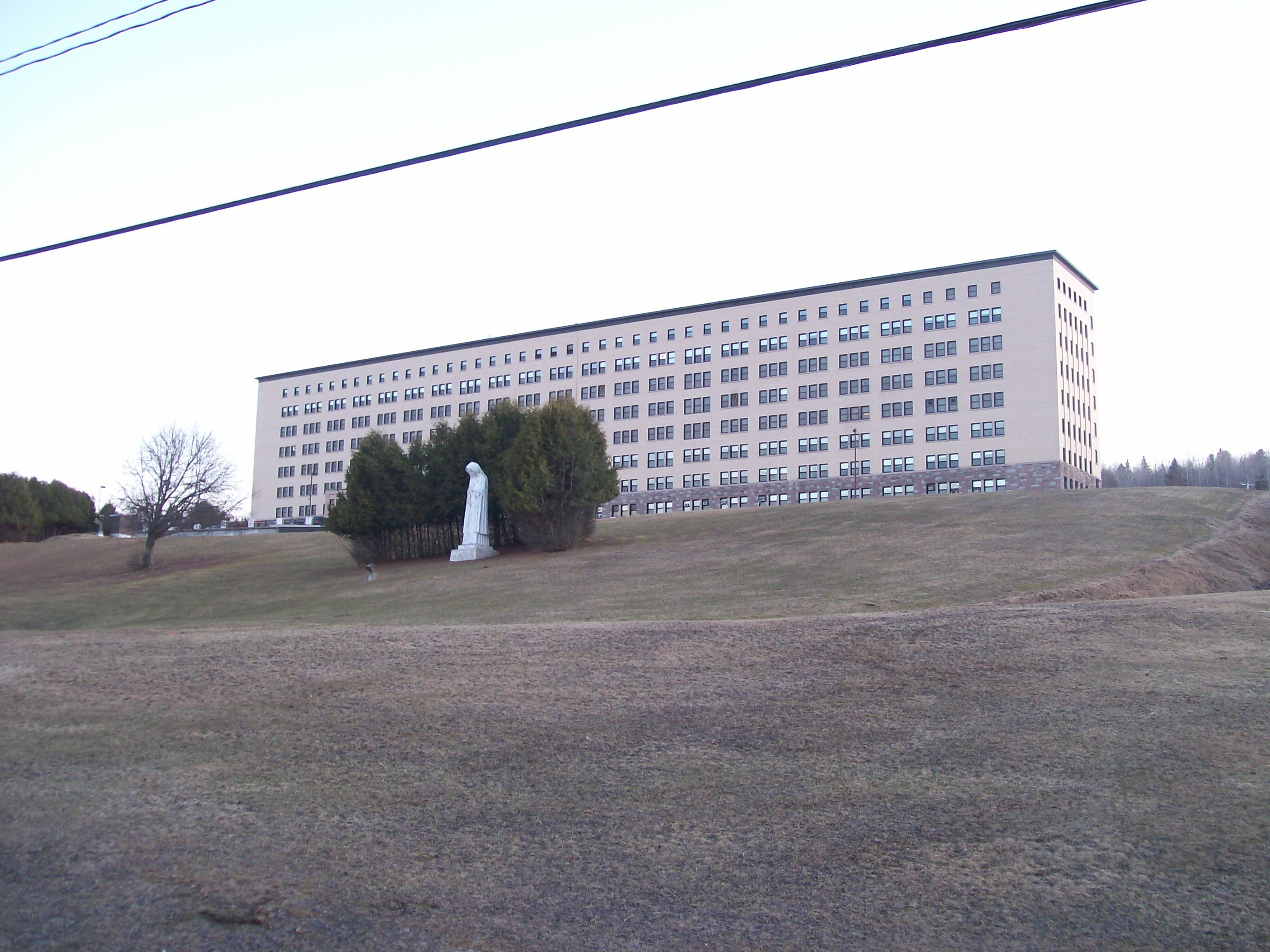
Centre Hospitalier Des Laurentides

The city also is home to the regional hospital, Le Centre Hospitalier Des Laurentides (CHDL), which is located in the L'Annonciation sector along the Trans-Canada highway. The hospital is in theory a full-service hospital, but each year the provincial health care budget changes considerably and cuts or expansions in services occur. A large portion of the hospital is allocated to the mental ward and to the care of psychiatric patients.

=== Police ===
The city does not have a municipal police or public safety force and must rely on the Mont-Laurier precinct of the Sûreté du Québec for police services.

=== Fire ===
The city has a volunteer fire department with two fire stations, one serving the Ste-Veronique sector and one serving both the L'Annonciation and Marchand sectors. Prior to the creation of the city, the villages of L'Annonciation and Canton Marchand operated a joint fire department. The city continued to use the same buildings and equipment from the villages.

== Education ==
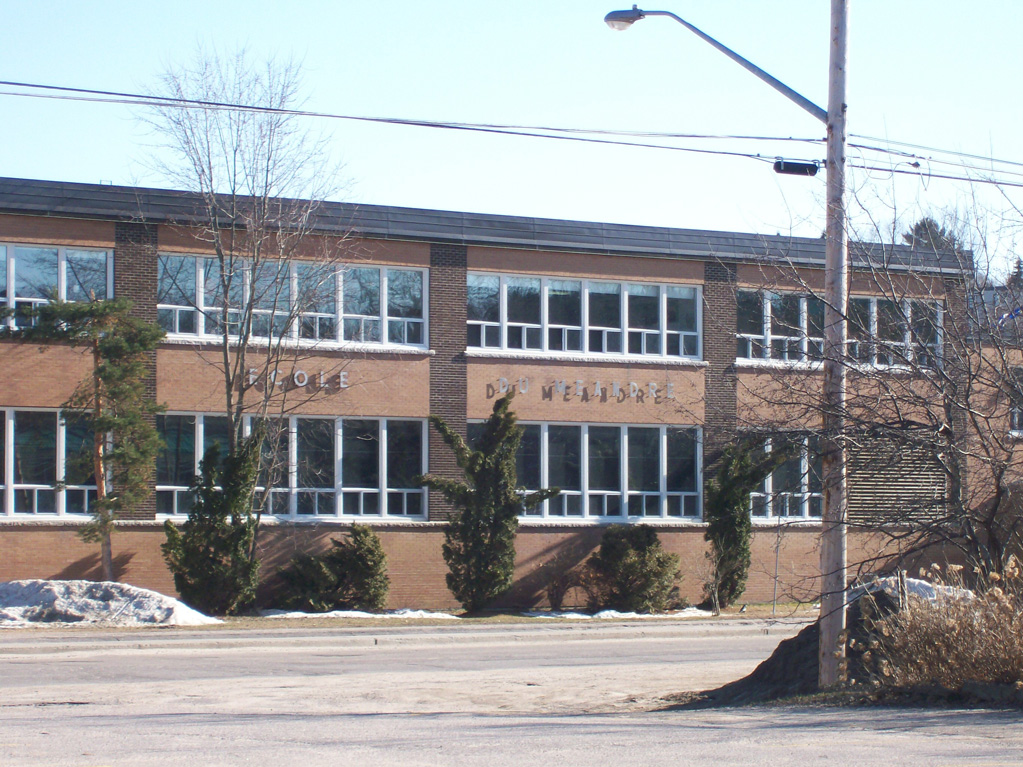
Du Méandre School

Commission scolaire Pierre-Neveu (CSPN) operates Francophone schools serving all sectors of Rivière-Rouge. It operates the two public schools in Rivière-Rouge.

- École du Meandre (known as Ecole Ste-Croix before the province of Quebec restructured their school systems) is located in the L'Annonciation sector. The school goes from kindergarten to secondary 3 (9th grade). It serves as the grade school for the L'Annonciation and Marchand sectors as well as the regional junior high school (secondary 1 through 3, or grades 7 through 9) for Rivière-Rouge, La Macaza, L’Ascension, Nominingue, Ste-Veronique, Lac Saguay and unincorporated areas in between.
- École du Christ-Roi, a part of École des Trois Sentiers, is a k-6 grade school located in the Ste-Veronique sector.
- Students must complete their last two years of high school at École Polyvalente St-Joseph in the nearby city of Mont-Laurier.

Saint Agathe Academy of the Sir Wilfrid Laurier School Board in Sainte-Agathe-des-Monts serves English-speaking students in all sectors of Rivière-Rouge.

== See also ==
- List of cities in Quebec
