= Urban agglomeration of Cookshire-Eaton =

Administrative division in Quebec, Canada

Coordinates: 45.4136°N 71.6249°W

The Urban agglomeration of Cookshire-Eaton is an urban agglomeration in Quebec that consists of:

- the city of Cookshire-Eaton
- the municipality of Newport

== History ==
As part of the 2000–2006 municipal reorganization in Quebec, the City of Cookshire-Eaton was created on July 24, 2002, by the merger of the city of Cookshire, the municipality of Eaton, and the township municipality of Newport. Following a 2004 referendum Newport de-merged and became an independent municipality again on January 1, 2006.

However, the legislation governing the de-merger process provided for the creation of a new municipal structure, an urban agglomeration, which would continue to tie de-merged cities to their former partners for the provision of various municipal services.

== See also ==
- Urban agglomerations in Quebec
- 21st-century municipal history of Quebec
