= Urban agglomeration of Sainte-Marguerite–Estérel =

Administrative division in Quebec, Canada

The Urban agglomeration of Sainte-Marguerite–Estérel is an urban agglomeration in Quebec that consists of:

- the city of Sainte-Marguerite-du-Lac-Masson
- the city of Estérel

== History ==
As part of the 2000–2006 municipal reorganization in Quebec, the City of Sainte-Marguerite–Estérel was created on October 17, 2001 by the merger of the parish municipality of Sainte-Marguerite-du-Lac-Masson and the city of Estérel. Following a 2004 referendum Estérel de-merged and became an independent city again on January 1, 2006. The remaining part of the formerly merged city changed its name back to Sainte-Marguerite-du-Lac-Masson.

However, the legislation governing the de-merger process provided for the creation of a new municipal structure, an urban agglomeration, which would continue to tie de-merged cities to their former partners for the provision of various municipal services.

== See also ==
- Urban agglomerations in Quebec
- 21st-century municipal history of Quebec
