= Urban agglomeration of Mont-Tremblant =

The Urban agglomeration of Mont-Tremblant is an urban agglomeration in Quebec that consists of the city of Mont-Tremblant and the municipality of Lac-Tremblant-Nord.

== History ==
As part of the 2000–2006 municipal reorganization in Quebec, the city of Mont-Tremblant was created on November 8, 2001 by the merger of the municipality of Mont-Tremblant, the city of Saint-Jovite, the parish municipality of Saint-Jovite, and the municipality of Lac-Tremblant-Nord. Following a 2004 referendum Lac-Tremblant-Nord de-merged and became an independent municipality again on January 1, 2006.

However, the legislation governing the de-merger process provided for the creation of a new municipal structure, an urban agglomeration, which would continue to tie de-merged cities to their former partners for the provision of various municipal services.

== See also ==
- 21st-century municipal history of Quebec
