= Urban agglomeration of Sainte-Agathe-des-Monts =

Administrative division in Quebec, Canada

The Urban agglomeration of Sainte-Agathe-des-Monts is an urban agglomeration in Quebec that consists of:

- the city of Sainte-Agathe-des-Monts
- the municipality of Ivry-sur-le-Lac

== History ==
As part of the 2000–2006 municipal reorganization in Quebec, the City of Sainte-Agathe-des-Monts was created on February 27, 2002 by the merger of the city of Sainte-Agathe-des-Monts, the municipality of Sainte-Agathe-Nord, and the municipality of Ivry-sur-le-Lac. Following a 2004 referendum Ivry-sur-le-Lac de-merged and became an independent municipality again on January 1, 2006.

However, the legislation governing the de-merger process provided for the creation of a new municipal structure, an urban agglomeration, which would continue to tie de-merged cities to their former partners for the provision of various municipal services.

== See also ==
- Urban agglomerations in Quebec
- 21st-century municipal history of Quebec
