= Metropolitan Community (Quebec) =

The two metropolitan communities (French: communautés métropolitaines) or CMs are multi-functional institutions of local government in the Canadian province of Quebec. They cover, respectively, the metropolitan areas of Greater Montreal and Quebec City.

CMs were created in 2000 by the Quebec legislature, on analogous lines to the regional districts in British Columbia. They have responsibility for areas of common interest to their constituent municipalities such as urban planning, economic development, promotion of international trade, artistic and cultural development, public transportation and waste management. Each CM also has specific areas of jurisdiction defined by the legislation governing it.

== Communauté métropolitaine de Montréal (CMM) ==
For a list of the municipalities of the Communauté métropolitaine de Montréal, see Greater Montreal.

The CMM comprises 82 local municipalities in all, of which 21 do not belong to any Regional County Municipality (RCM), including Montreal itself. The CMM further encompasses the entire territory of four RCMs and parts of another six RCMs.

=== Powers ===
The powers of the CMM are defined in the Act respecting the Communauté métropolitaine de Montréal. The CMM has jurisdiction in the following fields:

- land planning;
- economic development;
- arts and culture promotion;
- social and affordable housing;
- facilities, infrastructure, services and activities of metropolitan importance;
- public transit and metropolitan arterial road network;
- waste management planning;
- air quality;
- wastewater.

It also plays a role in protecting and enhancing the metropolitan blue and green spaces and produces information tools for use in geomatics."

== Communauté métropolitaine de Québec (CMQ) ==
The CMQ consists of some 28 local municipalities, of which four do not belong to an RCM, including Quebec City itself. The CMQ also covers all of MRC de L'Île-d'Orleans and parts of La Côte-de-Beaupré and La Jacques-Cartier RCMs.

== See also ==
- List of municipalities in Quebec
- Administrative subdivisions of Quebec#Metropolitan communities
