= Quebecair Express =

Canadian airline

| IATA | ICAO | Call sign |
|---|---|---|
| Q0 | - | - |
- Commenced operations: 2003
- Ceased operations: 2005
- Fleet size: See Fleet below
- Destinations: See Services below
- Headquarters: L'Ancienne-Lorette, Quebec, Canada

Quebecair Express was an airline based in L'Ancienne-Lorette, Quebec, Quebec, Canada. It was established in 2003 and operated scheduled services. It was grounded at the end of January 2005, and is in negotiations to avert bankruptcy.

== Former code data ==
- IATA code: Q0

== Destinations ==
The airline served the areas around Côte-Nord, Gaspésie and Magdaline Islands in the province of Quebec.

As of January 2005, Quebecair Express operated services to the following domestic scheduled destinations: Chevery, Gaspé, Gethsemani, Baie-Comeau, Blanc-Sablon, Havre-Saint-Pierre, Îles de la Madeleine, Mont-Joli, Montreal, Grande-Rivière, Pakuashipi, Quebec City and Sept-Îles.

== Fleet ==
- Saab 340

== See also ==
- List of defunct airlines of Canada
