= Centre de services scolaire Pierre-Neveu =

Coordinates: 46.5523°N 75.4982°W

The Centre de services scolaire Pierre-Neveu serves five school districts in the Antoine-Labelle Regional County Municipality in the Laurentides region of the Canadian province of Quebec. The board, established in 1972, was named after Pierre Neveu, a religious figure in Quebec during the twentieth century.

The school board headquarters are in the École du Sacré-Cœur in Mont-Laurier.

== Current issues ==
The last school board elections take place on Sunday, November 2, 2014. The position of chairman has been chosen by universal suffrage. This is for a three-year term. The school board elections before this took place in 2007.

== Schools ==
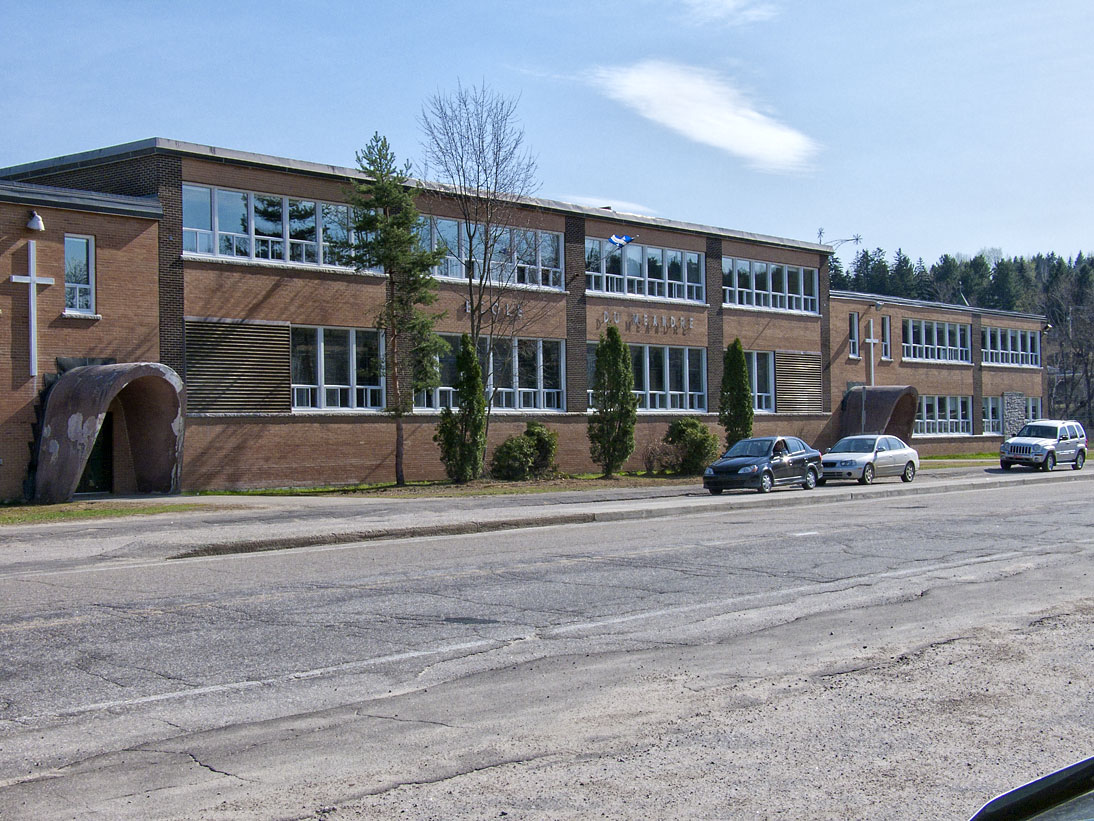
École du Méandre, previously école Sainte-Croix, located in the L'Annonciation sector of Rivière-Rouge.

=== Secondary schools ===
- École Polyvalente Saint-Joseph, including the main École Saint-Joseph and Le Pavillon (two campuses in Mont-Laurier)

=== Primary and secondary schools ===
- École du Méandre - L'Annonciation, Rivière-Rouge

=== Primary schools ===
They are ordered by region:

- École de la Madone et de la Carrière (all campuses in Mont-Laurier)
  - École de la Carrière (regional office)
  - École de la Madone
- École de Ferme-Neuve et des Rivières
  - École du Sacré-Cœur (regional office, at Ferme-Neuve)
  - École de Notre-Dame-du-Saint-Sacrement (Ferme-Neuve)
  - École du Sacré-Cœur (Mont-Saint-Michel)
  - École de Sainte-Anne (Sainte-Anne-du-Lac)
- École de la Lièvre-Sud
  - École de l'Amitié (regional office, Notre-Dame-du-Laus)
  - École de Notre-Dame (Notre-Dame-de-Pontmain)
- École aux Quatre Vents
  - École Notre-Dame (regional office, in Lac-des-Écorces)
  - École de Saint-Gérard (Kiamika)
  - École de Saint-François (Lac-des-Écorces)
  - École de Saint-Joseph (Lac-des-Écorces)
  - École Henri-Bourassa (Chute-Saint-Philippe)
- École du Val-des-Lacs (all campuses in Mont-Laurier)
  - École de Saint-Jean-l'Évangéliste (regional office)
  - École de Saint-Joachim
- École des Trois Sentiers
  - École du Saint-Rosaire (regional office, in Nominingue)
  - École de l'Aventure (L'Ascension)
  - École du Christ-Roi (Sainte-Veronique sector of Rivière-Rouge)
- École Jean-XXIII (all campuses in Mont-Laurier)
  - École Jean-XXIII (regional office)
  - École du Sacré-Cœur
- École Saint-Eugène (Mont-Laurier)
