= La Macaza =

- Municipality
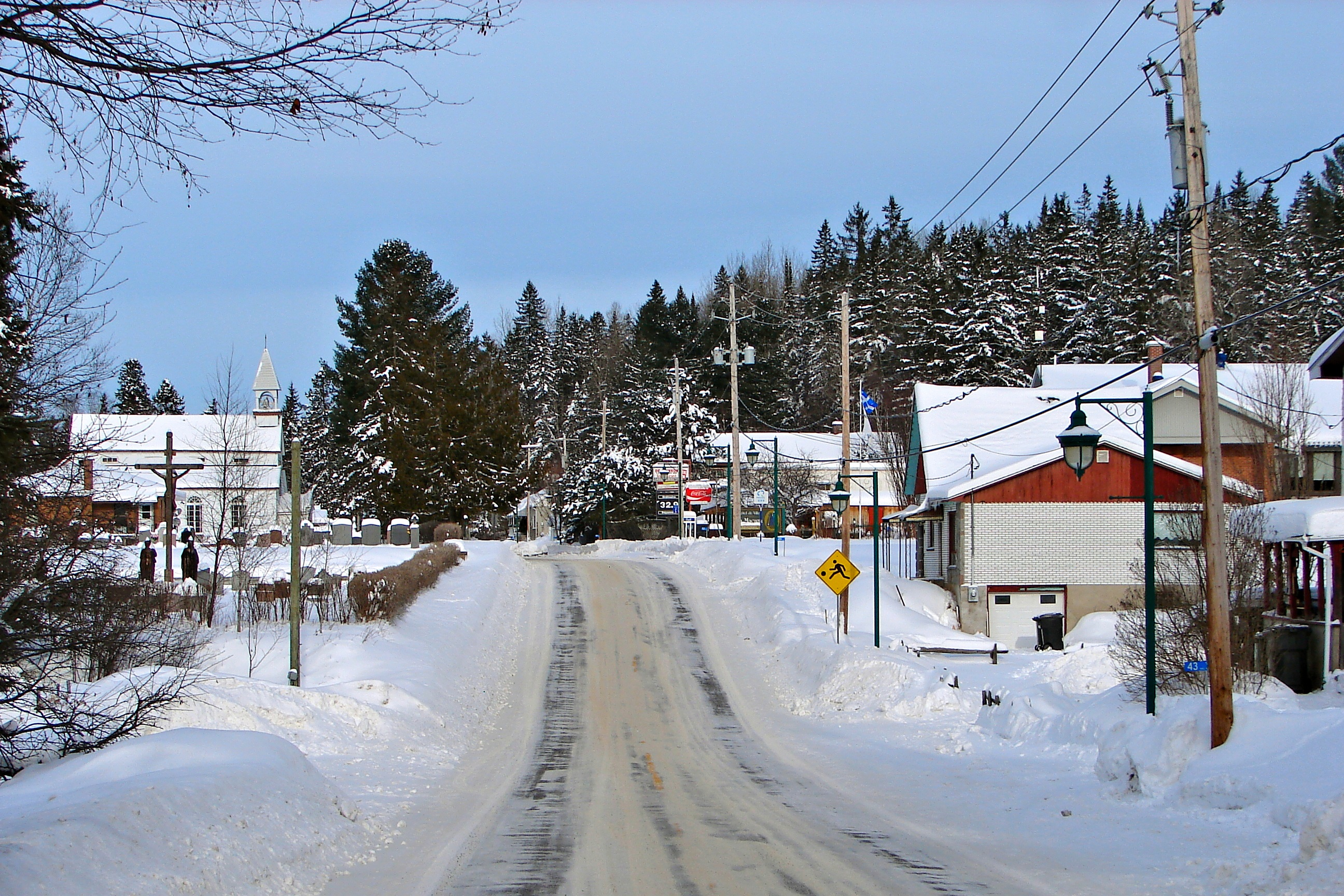

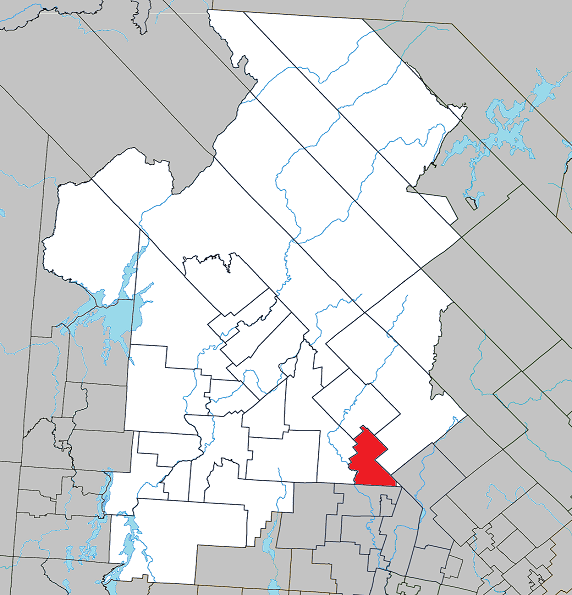
- Location within Antoine-Labelle RCM

- Location in central Quebec
- Coordinates: 46°22′N 74°46′W
- Country: Canada
- Province: Quebec
- Region: Laurentides
- RCM: Antoine-Labelle
- Settled: 1866
- Constituted: January 1, 2006

Government
  - Mayor: Simon Laplante
  - Federal riding: Laurentides—Labelle
  - Prov. riding: Labelle

Area
  - Total: 175.92 km^{2} (67.92 sq mi)
  - Land: 161.42 km^{2} (62.32 sq mi)

Population (2021)
  - Total: 1,094
  - Density: 6.8/km^{2} (18/sq mi)
  - Pop (2016–21): ▼4.9%
  - Dwellings: 997
- Time zone: UTC−5 (EST)
  - Summer (DST): UTC−4 (EDT)
- Postal code(s): J0T 1R0
- Area code: 819
- Highways: No major routes
- Website: www.munilamacaza.ca

La Macaza (French pronunciation: [la makaza]) is a municipality and village in the province of Quebec, Canada. The village is located in the Laurentian Mountains, in the Laurentian region, in Antoine-Labelle Regional County Municipality. Its population was at 1,094 in the 2021 Canadian census.

It is home to the La Macaza – Mont Tremblant International Airport that serves the region. The La Macaza Institution, a medium security federal penitentiary operated by the Correctional Service of Canada, is located adjacent to the airport.

There is a covered bridge that runs over the Macaza River, built in 1904, and is an international tourist attraction. There are many lakes and beaches in the municipality.

According to the Geographic Names of the province of Quebec (1921), "Macaza is the name of a native chief from the region", possibly the name of an old Amerindian who camped on the shores of Lake Macaza.

== History ==
Although indigenous peoples had lived in the area, the first European settlers arrived circa 1866. In 1904, La Macaza was established when the parish of Notre-Dame-du-Divin-Pasteur (Our Lady of Divine Shepherd) was founded. In 1930, the municipality was formed when its territory was detached from the municipality of Marchand (now part of Rivière-Rouge).

It was first a farming community and later on its inhabitants worked mostly in logging, but today La Macaza receives a flood of vacationers each year.

On December 18, 2002, La Macaza was merged into the new town of Rivière-Rouge when the Québec government forced certain province-wide mergers that were alleged to save citizens money. In 2004 the residents voted to separate from the city and on January 1, 2006, the municipality was reinstated.

== Geography ==
=== Climate ===
Climate data for La Macaza 1981−2010 normals, extremes 1976–present
Month	Jan	Feb	Mar	Apr	May	Jun	Jul	Aug	Sep	Oct	Nov	Dec	Year
Record high °C (°F)	12.0 (53.6)	12.2 (54.0)	20.0 (68.0)	30.0 (86.0)	35.0 (95.0)	36.0 (96.8)	35.0 (95.0)	35.0 (95.0)	35.0 (95.0)	26.1 (79.0)	19.5 (67.1)	12.5 (54.5)	36.0 (96.8)
Mean daily maximum °C (°F)	−7.1 (19.2)	−4 (25)	2.0 (35.6)	10.1 (50.2)	18.0 (64.4)	23.1 (73.6)	25.1 (77.2)	23.8 (74.8)	18.6 (65.5)	10.7 (51.3)	3.6 (38.5)	−3.8 (25.2)	10.0 (50.0)
Daily mean °C (°F)	−13.3 (8.1)	−11.1 (12.0)	−4.8 (23.4)	4.0 (39.2)	11.0 (51.8)	16.3 (61.3)	18.6 (65.5)	17.4 (63.3)	12.8 (55.0)	5.8 (42.4)	−0.5 (31.1)	−8.9 (16.0)	3.9 (39.1)
Mean daily minimum °C (°F)	−19.5 (−3.1)	−18 (0)	−11.4 (11.5)	−2.3 (27.9)	3.9 (39.0)	9.4 (48.9)	12.2 (54.0)	11.1 (52.0)	6.9 (44.4)	0.9 (33.6)	−4.7 (23.5)	−13.9 (7.0)	−2.1 (28.2)
Record low °C (°F)	−45 (−49)	−41.7 (−43.1)	−39 (−38)	−21.5 (−6.7)	−8 (18)	−2.5 (27.5)	−0.6 (30.9)	−1.5 (29.3)	−6.7 (19.9)	−12.0 (10.4)	−26.1 (−15.0)	−41 (−42)	−45 (−49)
Average precipitation mm (inches)	68.8 (2.71)	54.1 (2.13)	62.7 (2.47)	72.4 (2.85)	93.6 (3.69)	102.8 (4.05)	115.9 (4.56)	100.9 (3.97)	99.7 (3.93)	98.3 (3.87)	88.1 (3.47)	71.5 (2.81)	1,028.8 (40.51)
Average rainfall mm (inches)	18.7 (0.74)	15.4 (0.61)	33.4 (1.31)	64.1 (2.52)	93.3 (3.67)	102.8 (4.05)	115.9 (4.56)	100.9 (3.97)	99.6 (3.92)	95.3 (3.75)	67.8 (2.67)	21.1 (0.83)	828.3 (32.6)
Average snowfall cm (inches)	50.1 (19.7)	38.7 (15.2)	29.3 (11.5)	8.3 (3.3)	0.4 (0.2)	0.0 (0.0)	0.0 (0.0)	0.0 (0.0)	0.1 (0.0)	3.0 (1.2)	20.3 (8.0)	50.4 (19.8)	200.6 (78.9)
Average precipitation days (≥ 0.2 mm)	13.5	10.5	10.5	11.8	12.7	13.3	13.7	12.5	13.4	14.6	14.0	13.8	154.3
Average rainy days (≥ 0.2 mm)	2.2	2.2	4.9	10.9	12.7	13.3	13.7	12.5	13.3	14.3	9.4	3.3	112.7
Average snowy days (≥ 0.2 cm)	11.8	9.1	6.5	1.9	0.07	0.0	0.0	0.0	0.03	0.65	5.5	11.0	46.55
Source: Environment Canada

== Demographics ==
Canada census – La Macaza community profile

	2021	2016	2011
Population	1,094 (-4.9% from 2016)	1,150 (9.2% from 2011)	1,053 (7.4% from 2006)
Land area	161.42 km^{2} (62.32 sq mi)	163.48 km^{2} (63.12 sq mi)	162.78 km^{2} (62.85 sq mi)
Population density	6.8/km^{2} (18/sq mi)	7.0/km^{2} (18/sq mi)	6.5/km^{2} (17/sq mi)
Median age	58.4 (M: 57.2, F: 59.2)	55.6 (M: 54.7, F: 56.4)	53.7 (M: 53.9, F: 53.4)
Private dwellings	997 (total) 509 (occupied)	1,043 (total)	1,020 (total)
Median household income	$58,000	$42,944	$29,096

References: 2021 2016 2011

Historical census populations – La Macaza

Year	Pop.	±%
1931	421	—
1941	470	+11.6%
1951	537	+14.3%
1956	536	−0.2%
1961	604	+12.7%
1966	1,144	+89.4%

Year	Pop.	±%
1971	1,168	+2.1%
1976	651	−44.3%
1981	840	+29.0%
1986	863	+2.7%
1991	900	+4.3%
1996	1,020	+13.3%

Year	Pop.	±%
2001	1,015	−0.5%
2006	980	−3.4%
2011	1,053	+7.4%
2016	1,150	+9.2%
2021	1,094	−4.9%

Source: Statistics Canada

Mother tongue (2021):

- English as first language: 3.9%
- French as first language: 91%
- English and French as first language: 1.7%
- Other as first language: 3.9%

== Government ==
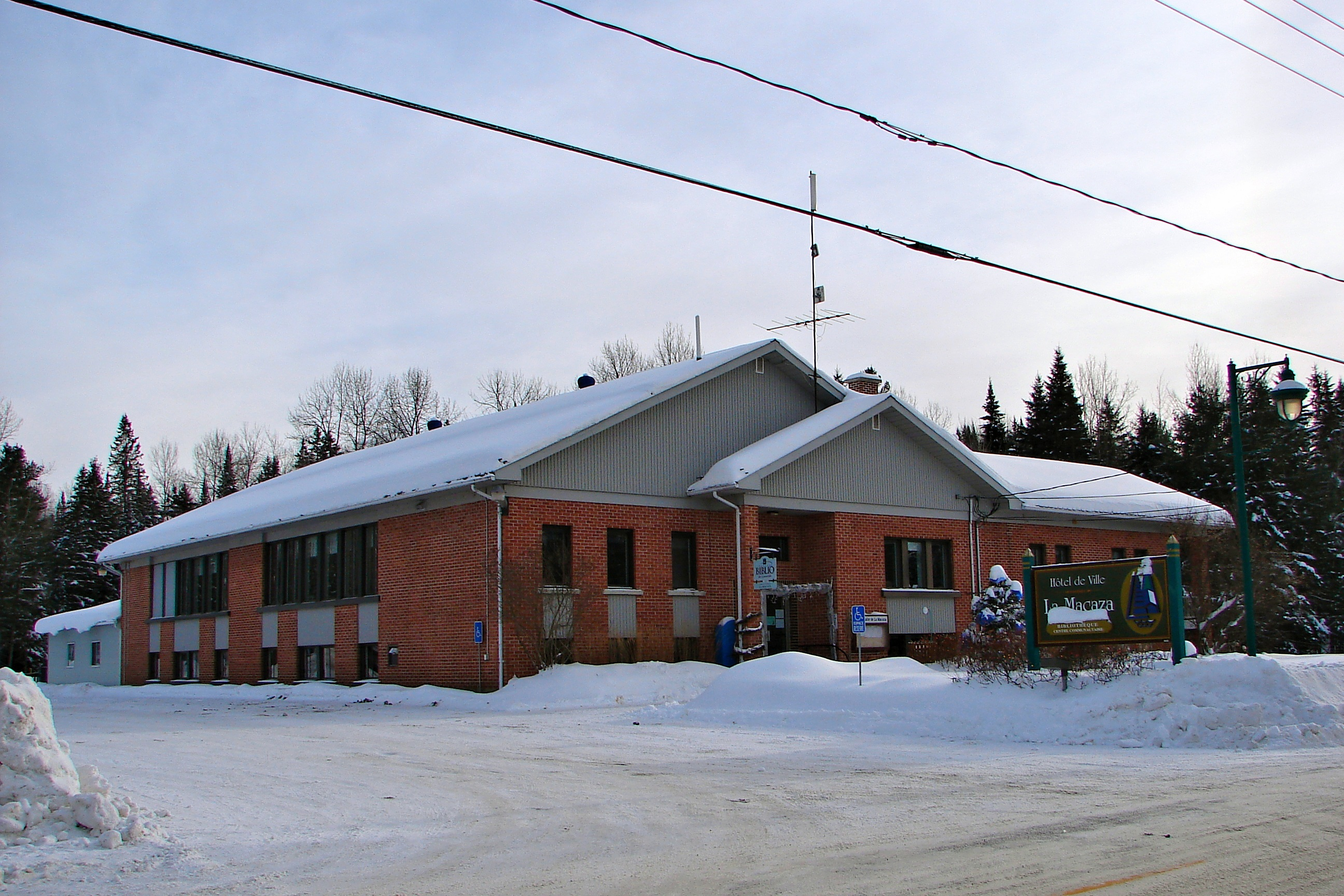
La Macaza municipal hall

List of former mayors:

- Christian Bélisle (2006–2013)
- Céline Beauregard (2013–2021)
- Yves Bélanger (2021–2025)
- Simon Laplante (2025–present)

== Education ==
Sainte Agathe Academy (of the Sir Wilfrid Laurier School Board) in Sainte-Agathe-des-Monts serves English-speaking students in this community for both elementary and secondary levels.

== See also ==
- List of municipalities in Quebec
