= Urban agglomeration of Quebec City =

Coordinates: 46.4900°N 71.1300°W

The urban agglomeration of Quebec City (French: agglomération urbaine de Québec) is an urban agglomeration in Quebec. It may also be referred to as the urban agglomeration of the city of Québec.

It consists of:

- Quebec City (Central municipality)
- L'Ancienne-Lorette
- Saint-Augustin-de-Desmaures

That is, it consists of the elements of the amalgamated city of Quebec City as it existed after amalgamation on January 1, 2002, including the two municipalities that chose to de-merge on January 1, 2006.

It differs from the census division of Quebec City in that the census division includes the Indian reserve of Wendake and the parish municipality of Notre-Dame-des-Anges, which are enclaves of Quebec City but do not belong to the agglomeration.

== See also ==
- Urban agglomerations of Quebec
- Municipal reorganization in Quebec
- 21st-century municipal history of Quebec
- Communauté métropolitaine de Québec
