= List of regions of Quebec =

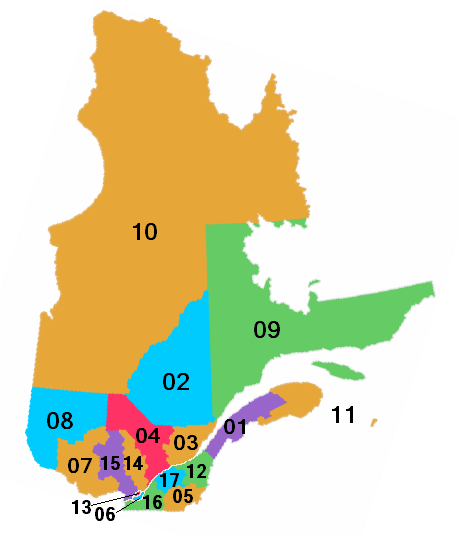
The seventeen administrative regions of Quebec.

The province of Quebec, Canada, is officially divided into 17 administrative regions. Traditionally (and unofficially), it is divided into around twenty regions. They have no government of their own, but rather serve primarily to organize the provision of provincial government services, most significantly the allocation of regional economic development funding. As of the 2021 Canadian census, the population of Quebec was 8,501,833, the land area was 1,298,599.75 km^{2} (501,392.17 sq mi) and the population density was 6.54 inhabitants per square kilometre (16.9/sq mi).

== Function ==
Administrative regions are used to organize the delivery of provincial government services. They were also the basis of organization for regional conferences of elected officers (French: conférences régionales des élus, CRÉ), with the exception of the Montérégie and Nord-du-Québec regions, which each had three CRÉs or equivalent bodies. In the Nord-du-Québec region, the Kativik Regional Government and Cree Regional Authority, in addition to their other functions, played the role of a CRÉ. The subregions of Montérégie and Nord-du-Québec had their own regional conference of elected officers (CRÉ).

=== Administrative regions ===
Along with the administrative regions, municipalities with 20,000-plus populations in the 2021 Census are also indicated, with those 50,000 or more shown in bold print.

Code	Region	Population Canada 2021 Census	Land area	Density (pop. per km^{2})	Major cities
01	Bas-Saint-Laurent	199,039	22,188.19 km^{2} (8,566.91 sq mi)	9.0	Rimouski, Rivière-du-Loup
02	Saguenay–Lac-Saint-Jean	275,552	95,542.70 km^{2} (36,889.24 sq mi)	2.9	Alma, **Saguenay**
03	Capitale-Nationale	757,950	18,684.78 km^{2} (7,214.23 sq mi)	40.6	**Quebec City**
04	Mauricie	273,055	35,475.80 km^{2} (13,697.28 sq mi)	7.7	Shawinigan, **Trois-Rivières**
05	Estrie	337,701	10,197.88 km^{2} (3,937.42 sq mi)	33.1	**Granby**, Magog, **Sherbrooke**
06	Montréal (Note: Coextensive with the urban agglomeration of the same name)	2,004,265	498.29 km^{2} (192.39 sq mi)	4,022.3	Côte-Saint-Luc, Dollard-des-Ormeaux, Mont-Royal, **Montreal**, Pointe-Claire
07	Outaouais	405,158	30,457.52 km^{2} (11,759.71 sq mi)	13.3	**Gatineau**
08	Abitibi-Témiscamingue	147,082	57,325.74 km^{2} (22,133.59 sq mi)	2.6	Rouyn-Noranda, Val-d'Or
09	Côte-Nord	88,525	234,442.27 km^{2} (90,518.67 sq mi)	0.4	Baie-Comeau, Sept-Îles
10	Nord-du-Québec	45,740	707,306.52 km^{2} (273,092.57 sq mi)	0.06	
11	Gaspésie–Îles-de-la-Madeleine	89,342	20,271.24 km^{2} (7,826.77 sq mi)	4.4	
12	Chaudière-Appalaches	433,312	15,071.51 km^{2} (5,819.14 sq mi)	28.8	**Lévis**, Saint-Georges, Thetford-Mines
13	Laval (Note: Coextensive with the equivalent territory and municipality of the same name)	438,366	246.13 km^{2} (95.03 sq mi)	1,781.0	**Laval**
14	Lanaudière	528,598	12,300.62 km^{2} (4,749.30 sq mi)	43.0	Joliette, L'Assomption, **Mascouche**, **Repentigny**, Saint-Lin-Laurentides, **Terrebonne**
15	Laurentides	636,083	20,557.42 km^{2} (7,937.26 sq mi)	30.9	**Blainville**, Boisbriand, **Mirabel**, Saint-Eustache, **Saint-Jérôme**, Sainte-Thérèse
16	Montérégie	1,591,620	11,111.82 km^{2} (4,290.30 sq mi)	143.2	Beloeil, Boucherville, **Brossard**, Candiac, Chambly, **Châteauguay**, La Prairie, **Longueuil**, Saint-Bruno-de-Montarville, Saint-Constant, **Saint-Hyacinthe**, **Saint-Jean-sur-Richelieu**, Saint-Lambert, Saint-Lazare, Sainte-Julie, Salaberry-de-Valleyfield, Sorel-Tracy, Varennes, Vaudreuil-Dorion
17	Centre-du-Québec	250,445	6,921.32 km^{2} (2,672.34 sq mi)	36.2	**Drummondville**, Victoriaville
	**Total**	**8,501,833**	**1,298,599.75 km^{2} (501,392.17 sq mi)**	**6.5**	

- Mauricie–Bois-Francs was split in 1997 to create Mauricie and Centre-du-Québec administrative regions (note, the notion of Mauricie as a traditional region long predates this)
- In January 2000, Québec administrative region was renamed Capitale-Nationale.

== Historical and traditional names ==
Quebec has a number of regions that go by historical and traditional names. Often, they have similar but distinct French and English names.

- Abitibi
- Lower Saint Lawrence (Bas-Saint-Laurent)
- Beauce (within Chaudière-Appalaches)
- Bois-Francs (within Centre-du-Québec)
- Charlevoix (eastern part of the Capitale-Nationale administrative region)
- Chateauguay Valley
- North Shore/Lower North Shore
- Eastern Townships (Cantons-de-l'Est)
- Gaspésie/Gaspé
- Lac-Saint-Jean/Lake St. John
- Magdalen Islands (Îles de la Madeleine)
- James Bay (Jamésie)
- Lanaudière
- Laurentians (Laurentides)
- Mauricie
- Montérégie
- Montreal region/Greater Montreal/Island of Montreal
- Nord-du-Québec (or Grand-Nord)
- Nunavik
- Ottawa Valley
- Outaouais
- Pontiac
- Quebec City region (corresponds to Capitale-Nationale)
- Rupert's Land
- Saguenay–Lac-Saint-Jean
- South Shore (Montreal) (Rive-Sud)
- Timiskaming (Témiscamingue)
- Ungava District

== See also ==
- Administrative divisions of Canada
- Administrative divisions of Quebec
- Culture of Quebec#Regional cultures
- Regional county municipality
  - List of regional county municipalities and equivalent territories in Quebec
- Lists of people from Quebec by region
- Regional conference of elected officers (CRÉ)
- Regional municipality, a type of municipal government in Ontario
