= Regional county municipality =

County-like political entities in Quebec, Canada

Regional county municipalities of Quebec
- Also known as: Municipalités régionales de comté du Québec
- Location: Province of Quebec
- Number: 87
- Populations: 7,082 (L'Île-d'Orléans) – 171,443 (Roussillon)
- Government: County government
- Subdivisions: Municipalities

The term regional county municipality or RCM (French: municipalité régionale de comté, pronounced [mynisipalite ʁeʒjɔnal də kɔ̃te], MRC) is used in Quebec, Canada, to refer to one of 87 county-like political entities. In some older English translations they were called county regional municipality.

Regional county municipalities are a supralocal type of regional municipality, and act as the local municipality in unorganized territories within their borders. The system of regional county municipalities was introduced beginning in 1979 to replace the historic counties of Quebec. In most cases, the territory of an RCM corresponds to that of a census division; however, there are a few exceptions.

Some local municipalities are outside any regional county municipality (hors MRC). This includes some municipalities within urban agglomerations and also some indigenous lands, such as Indian reserves that are enclaves within the territory of an RCM but not juridically part of it. Where complete territorial coverage is desired, for example for the census, the Indian reserve enclaves are added in to create "geographical RCMs", and the urban agglomerations are considered to be "territories equivalent to an RCM".

== As political entities ==
=== Governance and responsibilities ===
The council of a RCM is composed of the mayors of the member municipalities as well as the warden. The warden is usually elected by and from the council by secret ballot. Universal suffrage may also be used. The warden's term is two years when elected by council or four years when elected by universal suffrage.

A MRC must:

- manage land use by creating a land use scheme and revise it every five years;
- establish a plan for waste management, fire protection, and civil protection (police);
- apply the land use scheme;
- make and administer urban planning rules in unorganized territories;
- see to the proper functioning of watercourses in its territory, especially those used for agricultural drainage;
- prepare the evaluation rolls for local municipalities;
- sell buildings for property tax default;
- name or create, and fund, a local development centre to support regional businesses.

== Municipalities not belonging to an RCM ==
RCMs, in their definition as political units, do not cover the entire territory of Quebec. The local municipalities of Quebec (and equivalent Aboriginal territories) not belonging to an RCM fall into the following categories:

- all Indian reserves;
- 14 cities and urban agglomerations which do not belong to any RCM because they themselves exercise some or all of the powers which are normally those of an RCM (a city or agglomeration in some cases exercises only some of these powers because some RCM powers are in turn delegated to a metropolitan community), namely the:
  - urban agglomeration of Îles-de-la-Madeleine, Quebec
  - urban agglomeration of Quebec
  - city of Lévis
  - city of Shawinigan
  - city of Trois-Rivières
  - city of Sherbrooke
  - urban agglomeration of Longueuil
  - city of Laval
  - urban agglomeration of Montreal
  - city of Mirabel
  - city of Gatineau
  - city of Rouyn-Noranda
  - urban agglomeration of La Tuque
  - city of Saguenay;
- all the municipalities of the Nord-du-Québec administrative region; and
- the parish municipality of Notre-Dame-des-Anges.

== As geographical units ==
For provincial statistical purposes, the Institut de la Statistique du Québec uses the following system so that the entire territory of Quebec is divided into 104 units known as municipalités régionales de comté géographiques (MRCG) "geographical regional county municipalities".

Indian reserves which would, but for their status as Indian reserves, belong to a certain RCM in the political sense are included in the geographical RCM corresponding to that RCM. There are 86 MRCGs of this kind, one for each RCM. The rest of the province is grouped into 16 "territories equivalent to an RCM" (French: territoires équivalents à une MRC or territoires équivalents, abbreviated TÉ), which are also considered to be MRCGs. This is done as follows.

- The 14 cities and urban agglomerations not belonging to an RCM (see above) each form their own TE, except that:

- the TE of Québec consists of the urban agglomeration of Quebec City, the parish municipality of Notre-Dame-des-Anges and the Indian reserve of Wendake; and
- the TE of La Tuque consists of the urban agglomeration of La Tuque and three Indian reserves.

- The Nord-du-Québec administrative region is divided into three TEs as follows:

- The TE of Kativik is contained in the Nord-du-Québec region and consists of those municipalities under the jurisdiction of the Kativik Regional Government. The Kativik region comprises all northern villages and Inuit reserved lands, the only Naskapi village in the province, and two unorganized territories.
- The TE of Eeyou Istchee consists of those municipalities under the jurisdiction of the Cree Regional Authority—all Cree villages and Cree reserved lands. Local administration of the new TE is shared by Cree and non-Natives, essentially along pre-2012 lines.
- The TE of Jamésie consists of the portion of the Nord-du-Québec region which was not in the Kativik TE or the Eeyou Istchee TE. It consists of four local non-Aboriginal municipalities, and the special local municipality of Eeyou Istchee James Bay Territory, which is the territory outside the four non-Aboriginal municipalities which is jointly governed and managed by the Cree of Eeyou Istchee TE and the non-Cree of Jamésie TE.

== Census divisions ==
Census divisions (CDs) are used for statistical purposes by Statistics Canada. Quebec is divided into 98 CDs, each of which is assigned a unique two-digit geographical code. For the most part, Census Divisions consist of a single RCM or TE (territory equivalent to an RCM), exactly as defined above. The only exceptions are five census divisions divided into 11 RCMs or TEs, two or three each. For a list, see List of regional county municipalities and equivalent territories in Quebec used as census divisions.

== Geographical code of Quebec ==
All local municipalities, equivalent Aboriginal territories, Indian settlements and unorganized territories in Quebec are assigned a unique five-digit geographical code. The first two digits are the code of the census division in which the municipality is located. For a list of all municipalities in Quebec together with their legal status, geographical code and date of incorporation, see List of the official municipalities of Québec, Institut de la Statistique du Québec (ISQ). The ISQ includes the six Indian settlements in the list, whereas the Répertoire des municipalités of the Ministère des Affaires municipales et régionales does not list them as separate from the legal municipalities or unorganized territories in which they are located. Both sources include all other types of Aboriginal communities.

== See also ==
- Administrative divisions of Quebec
- Census geographic units of Canada
- Classification of municipalities in Quebec
- List of regional county municipalities and equivalent territories in Quebec
- Local municipality (Quebec)
