= 2000–2006 municipal reorganization in Quebec =

Round of municipal amalgamations in the province of Québec, Canada

The 2000–2006 municipal reorganization in Quebec resulted in large-scale amalgamation of smaller municipalities in Quebec into larger cities. It was undertaken by one administration, but was modified and partially undone by its successor.

The first phase involved many amalgamations from late 2000 until 2003, undertaken by the Parti Québécois government of Québec, headed by Premier Lucien Bouchard and his successor Bernard Landry. The most significant amalgamations, involving the largest cities in Quebec, mostly occurred on January 1, 2002. Some of the mergers were unpopular, and this became an issue in the April 14, 2003 Quebec election, in which the victorious Quebec Liberal Party led by Jean Charest campaigned on a promise to allow residents the right to choose to de-merge and reconstitute their former municipalities.

The new administration held referendums in various municipalities in 2004 to fulfill its campaign promise; however, a number of conditions were imposed, including a minimum voter participation threshold, which meant that not all merged municipalities held referendums and even fewer actually de-merged. The de-mergers that succeeded became effective on January 1, 2006. However, a new type of municipal structure, an urban agglomeration was created, which continued to tie the newly independent de-merged municipalities to their former amalgamation partners for the provision of certain municipal services.

The 2000–2003 municipal mergers were imposed on municipalities by the Québec government. In Canada, municipal governments are often referred to as creatures of their provincial governments, referring to their lack of governing authority. However, a number of voluntary amalgamations (arranged by municipalities themselves) had taken place in the 1990s (see 20th-century municipal history of Quebec); these earlier amalgamations were not subject to de-merger referendums. Municipal amalgamations had been encouraged by the Quebec government on the grounds they would result in greater efficiencies and cost savings; critics disputed this. The government also cited the precedent of the 1998 amalgamation of Toronto and the 2001 amalgamation of Ottawa.

== Merged cities ==
The following entities were created from these amalgamations:

=== Cities over 40,000 or mergers of more than five cities ===
- City of Montreal: former city of Montreal; cities of Anjou, Beaconsfield, Côte Saint-Luc, Dorval, Lachine, LaSalle, Montreal East, Montréal-Nord, Montreal West, Outremont, Pierrefonds, Pointe-Claire, Saint-Laurent, Saint Leonard, Verdun and Westmount; towns of Baie-d'Urfé, Hampstead, L'Île-Bizard, L'Île-Dorval, Mount Royal, Roxboro, Sainte-Anne-de-Bellevue and Sainte-Geneviève; village of Senneville. See Montreal Merger.
- City of Quebec: former city of Quebec; cities of Beauport, Cap-Rouge, Charlesbourg, L'Ancienne-Lorette, Lac-Saint-Charles, Loretteville, Saint-Émile, Sainte-Foy, Sillery, Val-Bélair, Vanier; municipality of Saint-Augustin-de-Desmaures.
- City of Longueuil: former city of Longueuil; cities of Boucherville, Brossard and Saint-Lambert; towns of Greenfield Park, LeMoyne, Saint-Bruno-de-Montarville and Saint-Hubert.
- City of Gatineau: former city of Gatineau; cities of Aylmer and Hull; town of Buckingham; township of Masson-Angers.
- City of Lévis: former city of Lévis; cities of Charny, Saint-Jean-Chrysostome, Saint-Nicolas, Saint-Rédempteur and Saint-Romuald; municipalities of Pintendre and Saint-Étienne-de-Lauzon; parishes of Sainte-Hélène-de-Breakeyville and Saint-Joseph-de-la-Pointe-de-Lévy.
- City of Saguenay: Former cities of Chicoutimi, Jonquière, La Baie, Laterrière; municipalities of Shipshaw and Lac-Kénogami; part of the township of Tremblay and 2 unincorporated areas.
- City of Shawinigan: former city of Shawinigan; cities of Grand-Mère and Shawinigan-Sud; municipality of Lac-à-la-Tortue; village of Saint-Georges-de-Champlain; parishes of Saint-Gérard-des-Laurentides and Saint-Jean-des-Piles; and the unincorporated areas of Lac-des-Cinq and Lac-Wapizagonke.
- City of Saint-Hyacinthe: Former city of Saint-Hyacinthe; village of Sainte-Rosalie; parishes of Sainte-Rosalie, Saint-Hyacinthe-le-Confesseur, Notre-Dame-de-Saint-Hyacinthe, Saint-Thomas-d'Aquin.
- City of Repentigny: Former city of Repentigny and the former town of Le Gardeur.
- City of Rimouski: former city of Rimouski; city of Pointe-au-Père; municipality of Mont-Lebel; village of Rimouski-Est; parishes of Sainte-Blandine and Sainte-Odile-sur-Rimouski.
- City of Rouyn-Noranda: former city of Rouyn-Noranda; city of Cadillac; municipalities of Arntfield, Bellecombe, Cléricy, Cloutier, D'Alembert, Destor, Évain, McWatters, Mont-Brun, Montbeillard and Rollet; unincorporated areas of Lac-Montanier, Lac-Surimau and Rapides-des-Cèdres.
- City of La Tuque: Former city of La Tuque; municipalities of La Bostonnais, La Corche, Lac-Édouard; Village of Parent; unincorporated areas of Kiskissink, Lac-Berlinguet, Lac-des-Moires, Lac-Pellerin, Lac-Tourlay, Obedjiwan, Petit-Lac-Wayagamac and Rivière-Windigo
- Municipality of Les Îles-de-la-Madeleine: municipalities of Fatima, Grande-Entrée, Grosse-Île, Havre-aux-Maisons, L'Étang-du-Nord and Havre-Aubert; village of Cap-aux-Meules.
- City of Sherbrooke: former city of Sherbrooke; cities of Bromptonville and Fleurimont; towns of Lennoxville and Rock Forest; municipalities of Ascot, Deauville and Saint-Élie-d'Orford.
- City of Trois-Rivières: former city of Trois-Rivières; cities of Cap-de-la-Madeleine, Sainte-Marthe-du-Cap, Saint-Louis-de-France and Trois-Rivières-Ouest; municipality of Pointe-du-Lac.
- City of Saint-Jérôme: former city of Saint-Jérôme; cities of Bellefeuille, Lafontaine and Saint-Antoine.
- City of Val-d'Or: former city of Val-d'Or; municipalities of Dubuisson, Sullivan, Val-Senneville and Vassan.

=== Other mergers ===
- City of Beauharnois: former city of Beauharnois; city of Maple Grove; village of Melocheville.
- City of Thetford Mines: Former cities of Thetford Mines and Black Lake; municipality of Pontbriand, village of Robertsonville and township of Thetford-Partie-Sud.
- City of Saint-Georges: Former city of Saint-Georges; municipality of Aubert-Gallion and parishes of Saint-Georges-Est and Saint-Jean-de-la-Lande.
- City of Mont-Tremblant: Former municipalities of Mont-Tremblant, Lac-Tremblant-Nord; village and parish of Saint-Jovite.
- City of Rivière-Rouge: Former municipalities of La Macaza and Marchand; former villages of L'Annonciation and Sainte-Véronique.
- City of Salaberry-de-Valleyfield: Former cities of Salaberry-de-Valleyfield and Saint-Timothée; municipality of Grande-Île.
- City of Matane: Former city of Matane; municipalities of Petit-Matane and Saint-Luc-de-Matane; parish of Saint-Jérôme-de-Matane.
- City of Sainte-Agathe-des-Monts: Former city of Sainte-Agathe-des-Monts; municipalities of Sainte-Agathe-Nord and Ivry-sur-le-Lac.
- City of Mont-Laurier: Former city of Mont-Laurier; municipalities of Des Ruisseaux and Saint-Aimé-du-Lac-des-Îles.
- City of Sept-Îles: Former cities of Sept-Îles and Moisie, municipality of Gallix.
- City of Cookshire-Eaton: Former city of Cookshire, townships of Eaton and Newport.
- City of Magog: Former city of Magog and township of Magog; village of Omerville
- City of Saint-Sauveur: Former village of Saint-Sauveur-des-Monts and parish of Saint-Sauveur.
- City of Sainte-Marguerite-Estérel: Former city of Estérel and parish of Sainte-Marguerite-du-Lac-Masson.
- City of Saint-Pie: Former city of Saint-Pie and parish of Saint-Pie.
- Municipality of Lacolle: Former village of Lacolle and parish of Notre-Dame-du-Mont-Carmel.
- Municipality of Grenville-sur-la-Rouge: Former township of Grenville and village of Calumet.
- City of Sutton: Former city of Sutton and township of Sutton.
- City of Port-Cartier: Former city of Port-Cartier and municipality of Rivière-Pentecôte.
- City of Métis-sur-Mer: Former village of Métis-sur-Mer and municipality of Les Boules.
- City of Lac-Etchemin: Former city of Lac-Etchemin and parish of Sainte-Germaine-du-Lac-Etchemin.
- City of Mont-Joli: Former city of Mont-Joli and municipality of Saint-Jean-Baptiste.
- City of Alma: Former city of Alma and municipality of Delisle.
- Municipality of Adstock: former municipality of Adstock and village of Sainte-Anne-du-Lac.
- City of Terrebonne: former cities of Terrebonne, Lachenaie, and La Plaine.
- City of Richelieu: former city of Richelieu and municipality of Notre-Dame-de-Bon-Secours

== Demerger referendums ==
After the 2003 election, the new Québec Liberal Party government led by Jean Charest adopted Bill 9, which created a formal process by which old municipalities could be reconstituted (in legal terms). Contrary to what was promised by Charest (full de-amalgamation), Bill 9 only restored specific powers to the demerged cities (e.g., animal control, garbage pickup, local street maintenance, some cultural facilities). The "bigger" expenses (e.g., police, fire, main streets, expansion programs) and the majority of the taxes remained in the hands of urban agglomerations, which are controlled by the central merged city because their larger populations give them greater voting weight. In Montreal, the de-amalgamated cities hold only 13% of the votes on the agglomeration council.

This consulting process about Bill 9 required 10% of voters residing within an amalgamated municipality to sign a petition to demand the holding of a referendum on de-amalgamation. To succeed, a referendum had to fulfill two conditions:

- A majority must vote yes to de-amalgamation.
- 'Yes' voters must represent at least 35% of all registered electors.

Referendums were held on June 20, 2004 in 89 of the former municipalities of Québec. The 'Yes' vote recorded majorities in several municipalities, but did not reach the required threshold of 35% of registered voters. A total of 32 former municipalities met the conditions required to de-amalgamate and were re-established on January 1, 2006.

The demerging municipalities were:

- From Montreal: Baie-D'Urfé, Beaconsfield, Dollard-des-Ormeaux, Dorval, Kirkland, L'Île-Dorval, Pointe-Claire, Sainte-Anne-de-Bellevue and Senneville in the West Island; Côte Saint-Luc, Hampstead, Mount Royal, Montreal West and Westmount in the West End; Montreal East in the East End
- From Quebec City: L'Ancienne-Lorette and Saint-Augustin-de-Desmaures
- From Longueuil: Boucherville, Brossard, Saint-Bruno-de-Montarville and Saint-Lambert
- From La Tuque: La Bostonnais and Lac-Édouard
- From Les Îles-de-la-Madeleine: Cap-aux-Meules and Grosse-Île
- From Mont-Tremblant: Lac-Tremblant-Nord
- From Rivière-Rouge: La Macaza
- From Sainte-Agathe-des-Monts: Ivry-sur-le-Lac
- From Mont-Laurier: Saint-Aimé-du-Lac-des-Îles
- From Cookshire-Eaton: Newport

Additionally, Estérel voted to demerge from Sainte-Marguerite-Estérel, effectively reversing the merger between Estérel and Sainte-Marguerite-du-Lac-Masson. After the demerger came into effect, the city changed its name back to Sainte-Marguerite-du-Lac-Masson.

== See also ==
- 2002–2006 municipal reorganization of Montreal
- 2004 Quebec municipal referendums
- 2015 Manitoba municipal amalgamations
- 2023 New Brunswick local governance reform
- Administrative divisions of Quebec
- Amalgamation (politics)
- List of former municipalities in Quebec
- List of municipal amalgamations in Alberta
- Local government in Quebec
- 21st-century municipal history of Quebec
- Urban agglomerations of Quebec
