= 2004 Quebec municipal referendums =

The 2004 Quebec municipal referendums were held by the Quebec Liberal Party government of Jean Charest that came to power in the 2003 Quebec election, in fulfillment of a campaign promise to allow voters to have a say regarding the municipal reorganization program that had been undertaken by the preceding Parti Québécois administration.

From late 2000 to 2003, the PQ government had amalgamated (merged) many Quebec cities with their suburbs or neighbouring municipalities. This was imposed through legislation by the Quebec government rather than by the initiative of the municipalities themselves. In Canada, municipal governments are creatures of the provincial governments. However, the amalgamation proved unpopular in some places, with residents wishing to de-merge from the newly expanded cities and reconstitute their former municipalities. The 2004 referendums were organized to provide an opportunity to vote on the matter.

As of 2026, this is the most recent referendum in Quebec.

== Results ==
As a first step, a minimum threshold of 10% of the population of a former municipality was required to sign a register in order for a referendum to be held. The registers were open from 16 to 20 May 2004. When this criterion was met, referendums were scheduled on June 20, 2004. To be unmerged, they had to obtain a more than 50% of the vote for "yes", representing at least 35% of the electors.

New municipality	Old municipality	Register	For	Against	Turnout
Adstock	Village of Sainte-Anne-du-Lac	3.86%	No referendum		
Adstock	Municipality of Adstock	0.45%	No referendum		
Alma	City of Alma	Nobody	No referendum		
Alma	Municipality of Delisle	0.12%	No referendum		
Beauharnois	City of Maple Grove	23.94%	48.65%	51.35%	31.43%
Beauharnois	Village of Melocheville	10.50%	47.04%	52.96%	26.01%
Beauharnois	City of Beauharnois	0.20%	No referendum		
Cookshire-Eaton	Township of Newport, Quebec	21.58%	72.03%	27.97%	35.78%
Cookshire-Eaton	City of Cookshire	5.81%	No referendum		
Cookshire-Eaton	Municipality of Eaton	2.57%	No referendum		
Gatineau	City of Aylmer	17.22%	58.05%	41.95%	26.48%
Gatineau	City of Buckingham	13.87%	41.77%	58.23%	20.27%
Gatineau	City of Hull	10.09%	39.64%	60.36%	15.71%
Gatineau	City of Masson-Angers	20.14%	66.61%	33.39%	34.80%
Gatineau	City of Gatineau	5.40%	No referendum		
Grenville-sur-la-Rouge	Village of Calumet	6.98%	No referendum		
Grenville-sur-la-Rouge	Township of Grenville	1.57%	No referendum		
La Tuque	Municipality of La Croche	10.42%	35.71%	64.29%	11.01%
La Tuque	Municipality of La Bostonnais	21.11%	74.31%	25.69%	40.91%
La Tuque	Municipality of Lac-Édouard	17.16%	92.89%	7.11%	43.08%
La Tuque	Village of Parent	14.39%	42.86%	57.14%	25.44%
La Tuque	Municipality of La Tuque	0.15%	No referendum		
Lac-Etchemin	City of Lac-Etchemin	Nobody	No referendum		
Lac-Etchemin	Parish of Sainte-Germaine-du-Lac-Etchemin	1.26%	No referendum		
Lacolle	Parish of Notre-Dame-du-Mont-Carmel	14.50%	38.44%	61.56%	26.97%
Lacolle	Village of Lacolle	0.42%	No referendum		
Les Îles-de-la-Madeleine	Municipality of Grosse-Île	35.02%	81.70%	18.30%	60.09%
Les Îles-de-la-Madeleine	Village of Cap-aux-Meules^{[a]}	16.64%	62.77%	37.23%	39.81%
Les Îles-de-la-Madeleine	Municipality of Fatima	4.11%	No referendum		
Les Îles-de-la-Madeleine	Municipality of L'Île-du-Havre-Aubert	3.28%	No referendum		
Les Îles-de-la-Madeleine	Municipality of Havre-aux-Maisons	1.23%	No referendum		
Les Îles-de-la-Madeleine	Municipality of Grande-Entrée	0.74%	No referendum		
Les Îles-de-la-Madeleine	Municipality of L'Étang-du-Nord	0.61%	No referendum		
Lévis	City of Charny	10.71%	47.77%	52.23%	18.29%
Lévis	City of Saint-Nicolas	16.64%	54.27%	45.73%	27.04%
Lévis	City of Saint-Rédempteur	14.52%	37.62%	62.38%	19.68%
Lévis	Municipality of Saint-Étienne-de-Lauzon	23.38%	55.99%	44.01%	28.00%
Lévis	City of Saint-Romuald	8.13%	No referendum		
Lévis	City of Saint-Jean-Chrysostome	7.45%	No referendum		
Lévis	Parish of Sainte-Hélène-de-Breakeyville	7.28%	No referendum		
Lévis	Municipality of Pintendre	4.48%	No referendum		
Lévis	Parish of Saint-Joseph-de-la-Pointe-de-Lévy	4.14%	No referendum		
Lévis	City of Lévis	3.71%	No referendum		
Longueuil	City of Greenfield Park	16.71%	65.51%	34.49%	27.34%
Longueuil	City of Boucherville	34.73%	75.66%	24.34%	47.95%
Longueuil	City of Brossard	23.48%	80.94%	19.06%	38.70%
Longueuil	City of Saint-Bruno-de-Montarville	36.20%	72.04%	27.96%	47.61%
Longueuil	City of Saint-Lambert	31.16%	69.71%	30.29%	41.40%
Longueuil	City of LeMoyne	2.23%	No referendum		
Longueuil	City of Saint-Hubert	1.84%	No referendum		
Longueuil	City of Longueuil	0.43%	No referendum		
Magog	Township of Magog	17.99%	59.83%	40.17%	25.57%
Magog	Village of Omerville	0.96%	No referendum		
Magog	City of Magog, Quebec	0.31%	No referendum		
Matane	Municipality of Petit-Matane	16.62%	24.52%	75.48%	10.96%
Matane	Municipality of Saint-Luc-de-Matane	13.49%	29.24%	70.76%	16.62%
Matane	Parish of Saint-Jérôme-de-Matane	5.13%	No referendum		
Matane	City of Matane	0.15%	No referendum		
Métis-sur-Mer	Métis-sur-Mer	11.40%	44.07%	55.93%	22.67%
Métis-sur-Mer	Les Boules	4.46%	No referendum		
Mont-Joli	Municipality of Saint-Jean-Baptiste	12.79%	47.23%	52.77%	22.86%
Mont-Joli	City of Mont-Joli	0.04%	No referendum		
Mont-Laurier	Municipality of Saint-Aimé-du-Lac-des-Îles	34.62%	79.59%	20.41%	52.38%
Mont-Laurier	Municipality of Des Ruisseaux	2.14%	No referendum		
Mont-Laurier	City of Mont-Laurier	0.03%	No referendum		
Montreal	City (Cité) of Côte Saint-Luc	25.81%	87.04%	12.96%	40.43%
Montreal	City (Cité) of Dorval	31.19%	76.80%	23.20%	41.41%
Montreal	City of Anjou	16.88%	57.03%	42.97%	26.47%
Montreal	City of LaSalle	11.21%	60.81%	39.19%	20.55%
Montreal	City of L'Île-Bizard	21.21%	63.53%	36.47%	33.68%
Montreal	City of Pierrefonds	15.87%	70.14%	29.86%	24.87%
Montreal	City of Roxboro	25.08%	67.16%	32.84%	33.36%
Montreal	City of Sainte-Geneviève	14.21%	65.65%	34.35%	21.49%
Montreal	City of Saint-Laurent	18.53%	75.31%	24.69%	28.58%
Montreal	City of Baie-d'Urfé	57.37%	92.94%	7.06%	72.80%
Montreal	City of Beaconsfield	37.72%	80.44%	19.56%	45.88%
Montreal	City of Dollard-des-Ormeaux	24.11%	85.23%	14.77%	37.58%
Montreal	City of Hampstead	24.71%	90.41%	9.59%	47.21%
Montreal	City of Kirkland	28.49%	87.63%	12.37%	47.32%
Montreal	City of L'Île-Dorval	79.17%	75.51%	24.49%	74.00%
Montreal	City of Montreal West	36.71%	82.62%	17.38%	47.52%
Montreal	City of Montreal-Est	36.02%	84.51%	15.49%	45.16%
Montreal	City of Mount Royal	24.36%	81.82%	18.18%	41.69%
Montreal	City of Pointe-Claire	36.55%	90.02%	9.98%	52.81%
Montreal	City of Sainte-Anne-de-Bellevue	26.83%	82.26%	17.74%	47.68%
Montreal	City of Westmount	38.49%	92.13%	7.87%	52.71%
Montreal	Village of Senneville	61.80%	93.42%	6.58%	73.63%
Montreal	City of Lachine	6.78%	No referendum		
Montreal	City of Saint-Léonard	3.23%	No referendum		
Montreal	City of Outremont	2.60%	No referendum		
Montreal	City of Verdun	2.24%	No referendum		
Montreal	City of Montreal-Nord	1.62%	No referendum		
Montreal	City of Montreal	0.18%	No referendum		
Mont-Tremblant	Municipality of Mont-Tremblant	21.38%	71.10%	28.90%	31.34%
Mont-Tremblant	Municipality of Lac-Tremblant-Nord	42.77%	84.47%	15.53%	50.29%
Mont-Tremblant	Parish of Saint-Jovite	0.58%	No referendum		
Mont-Tremblant	City of Saint-Jovite	0.26%	No referendum		
Port-Cartier	Municipality of Rivière-Pentecôte	1.35%	No referendum		
Port-Cartier	City of Port-Cartier	0.13%	No referendum		
Quebec City	City of Beauport	12.85%	46.16%	53.84%	19.42%
Quebec City	City of Cap-Rouge	17.28%	39.00%	61.00%	22.48%
Quebec City	City of Charlesbourg	13.44%	43.42%	56.58%	18.40%
Quebec City	City of Lac-Saint-Charles	21.47%	66.44%	33.56%	29.86%
Quebec City	City of Loretteville	11.19%	33.62%	66.38%	14.35%
Quebec City	City of Sainte-Foy	20.20%	52.19%	47.81%	27.35%
Quebec City	City of Saint-Émile	15.01%	49.99%	50.01%	21.16%
Quebec City	City of Sillery	24.35%	51.48%	48.52%	33.56%
Quebec City	City of Val-Bélair	13.31%	49.76%	50.24%	18.68%
Quebec City	City of Vanier	17.34%	61.37%	38.63%	23.19%
Quebec City	City of L'Ancienne-Lorette	29.64%	67.07%	32.93%	40.94%
Quebec City	Municipality of Saint-Augustin-de-Desmaures	24.40%	62.48%	37.52%	38.40%
Quebec City	City of Quebec	2.65%	No referendum		
Rimouski	Municipality of Mont-Lebel	Nobody	No referendum		
Rimouski	Parish of Sainte-Odile-sur-Rimouski	2.50%	No referendum		
Rimouski	City of Pointe-au-Père	1.09%	No referendum		
Rimouski	Parish of Sainte-Blandine	0.54%	No referendum		
Rimouski	Village of Rimouski-Est	0.47%	No referendum		
Rimouski	City of Rimouski	0.06%	No referendum		
Rivière-Rouge	Municipality of La Macaza	31.34%	77.50%	22.50%	42.19%
Rivière-Rouge	Village of Sainte-Véronique	15.38%	44.35%	55.65%	21.50%
Rivière-Rouge	Village of L'Annonciation	0.44%	No referendum		
Rivière-Rouge	Municipality of Marchand	0.32%	No referendum		
Rouyn-Noranda	Municipality of Mont-Brun	24.14%	28.92%	71.08%	20.35%
Rouyn-Noranda	Municipality of Destor	Nobody	No referendum		
Rouyn-Noranda	City of Cadillac	7.04%	No referendum		
Rouyn-Noranda	Municipality of D’Alembert	6.94%	No referendum		
Rouyn-Noranda	Municipality of Cloutier	5.63%	No referendum		
Rouyn-Noranda	Municipality of Rollet	4.50%	No referendum		
Rouyn-Noranda	Municipality of McWatters	4.46%	No referendum		
Rouyn-Noranda	Municipality of Évain	4.09%	No referendum		
Rouyn-Noranda	Municipality of Arntfield	1.66%	No referendum		
Rouyn-Noranda	Municipality of Cléricy	1.28%	No referendum		
Rouyn-Noranda	Municipality of Bellecombe	1.13%	No referendum		
Rouyn-Noranda	Municipality of Montbeillard	1.02%	No referendum		
Rouyn-Noranda	City of Rouyn-Noranda	0.06%	No referendum		
Saguenay	City of La Baie	9.67%	No referendum		
Saguenay	City of Laterrière	6.66%	No referendum		
Saguenay	City of Chicoutimi	5.53%	No referendum		
Saguenay	City of Jonquière	1.67%	No referendum		
Saguenay	Municipality of Lac-Kénogami	1.60%	No referendum		
Saguenay	Municipality of Shipshaw	0.92%	No referendum		
Saguenay	Township of Tremblay	0.66%	No referendum		
Sainte-Agathe-des-Monts	Municipality of Sainte-Agathe-Nord	16.26%	51.19%	48.81%	19.03%
Sainte-Agathe-des-Monts	Municipality of Ivry-sur-le-Lac	24.79%	67.98%	32.02%	40.47%
Sainte-Agathe-des-Monts	City of Sainte-Agathe-des-Monts	0.11%	No referendum		
Sainte-Marguerite-Estérel	City of Estérel	35.44%	83.73%	16.27%	52.11%
Sainte-Marguerite-Estérel	Parish of Sainte-Marguerite-du-Lac-Masson	0.10%	No referendum		
Saint-Georges	Municipality of Aubert-Gaillon	15.78%	34.63%	65.37%	22.63%
Saint-Georges	Parish of Saint-Georges-Est	9.16%	No referendum		
Saint-Georges	Parish of Saint-Jean-de-la-Lande	3.83%	No referendum		
Saint-Georges	City of Saint-Georges	0.16%	No referendum		
Saint-Hyacinthe	Parish of Sainte-Rosalie	13.51%	49.85%	50.15%	27.51%
Saint-Hyacinthe	Parish of Saint-Hyacinthe-le-Confesseur	6.37%	No referendum		
Saint-Hyacinthe	Parish of Saint-Thomas-d'Aquin	3.44%	No referendum		
Saint-Hyacinthe	Parish of Notre-Dame-de-Saint-Hyacinthe	2.93%	No referendum		
Saint-Hyacinthe	City of Sainte-Rosalie	1.06%	No referendum		
Saint-Hyacinthe	City of Saint-Hyacinthe	0.11%	No referendum		
Saint-Jean-sur-Richelieu	Parish of Saint-Athanase	13.46%	44.75%	55.25%	22.02%
Saint-Jean-sur-Richelieu	Municipality of L'Acadie	5.14%	No referendum		
Saint-Jean-sur-Richelieu	City of Iberville	3.36%	No referendum		
Saint-Jean-sur-Richelieu	City of Saint-Luc	1.17%	No referendum		
Saint-Jean-sur-Richelieu	City of Saint-Jean-sur-Richelieu	0.37%	No referendum		
Saint-Jérôme	City of Bellefeuille	0.71%	No referendum		
Saint-Jérôme	City of Saint-Antoine	0.28%	No referendum		
Saint-Jérôme	City of Lafontaine	0.13%	No referendum		
Saint-Jérôme	City of Saint-Jérôme	0.05%	No referendum		
Saint-Pie	Parish of Saint-Pie	3.48%	No referendum		
Saint-Pie	City of Saint-Pie	0.16%	No referendum		
Saint-Sauveur	Parish of Saint-Sauveur	0.27%	No referendum		
Saint-Sauveur	Village of Saint-Sauveur-des-Monts	0.06%	No referendum		
Salaberry-de-Valleyfield	City of Saint-Timothée	19.51%	59.47%	40.53%	30.02%
Salaberry-de-Valleyfield	Municipality of Grande-Île	18.60%	59.72%	40.28%	30.40%
Salaberry-de-Valleyfield	City of Salaberry-de-Valleyfield	0.20%	No referendum		
Sept-Îles	Municipality of Gallix	11.79%	22.91%	77.09%	10.50%
Sept-Îles	City of Moisie	3.12%	No referendum		
Sept-Îles	City of Sept-Îles	1.68%	No referendum		
Shawinigan	City of Grand-Mère	17.93%	51.05%	48.95%	25.38%
Shawinigan	Municipality of Lac-à-la-Tortue	11.52%	56.77%	43.23%	31.47%
Shawinigan	Parish of Saint-Gérard-des-Laurentides	19.27%	50.57%	49.43%	27.71%
Shawinigan	Parish of Saint-Jean-des-Piles	12.03%	31.32%	68.68%	18.32%
Shawinigan	Village of Saint-Georges	13.79%	50.87%	49.13%	26.47%
Shawinigan	City of Shawinigan-Sud	7.94%	No referendum		
Shawinigan	City of Shawinigan	0.29%	No referendum		
Sherbrooke	City of Bromptonville	12.76%	38.65%	61.35%	20.01%
Sherbrooke	City of Lennoxville	14.97%	52.49%	47.51%	18.56%
Sherbrooke	Municipality of Deauville	17.69%	55.11%	44.89%	26.11%
Sherbrooke	Municipality of Saint-Élie-d'Orford	21.84%	47.81%	52.19%	23.33%
Sherbrooke	City of Rock Forest	4.59%	No referendum		
Sherbrooke	Municipality of Stoke^{[b]}	2.86%	No referendum		
Sherbrooke	City of Fleurimont	1.17%	No referendum		
Sherbrooke	Municipality of Ascot	1.13%	No referendum		
Sherbrooke	City of Sherbrooke	0.21%	No referendum		
Sutton	Township of Sutton	12.64%	49.25%	50.75%	20.64%
Sutton	City of Sutton	0.35%	No referendum		
Terrebonne	City of Lachenaie	0.77%	No referendum		
Terrebonne	City of La Plaine	0.61%	No referendum		
Terrebonne	City of Terrebonne	0.09%	No referendum		
Thetford Mines	City of Black Lake	17.41%	37.86%	62.14%	26.24%
Thetford Mines	Village of Robertsonville	18.39%	43.62%	56.38%	32.82%
Thetford Mines	Municipality of Pontbriand	8.74%	No referendum		
Thetford Mines	Township of Thetford-Partie-Sud	0.97%	No referendum		
Thetford Mines	City of Thetford Mines	0.48%	No referendum		
Trois-Rivières	City of Cap-de-la-Madeleine	6.56%	No referendum		
Trois-Rivières	City of Saint-Louis-de-France	4.55%	No referendum		
Trois-Rivières	City of Sainte-Marthe-du-Cap	4.52%	No referendum		
Trois-Rivières	Municipality of Pointe-du-Lac	4.35%	No referendum		
Trois-Rivières	City of Trois-Rivières-Ouest	1.32%	No referendum		
Trois-Rivières	City of Trois-Rivières	0.30%	No referendum		
Val-d'Or	Municipality of Dubuisson	7.39%	No referendum		
Val-d'Or	Municipality of Val-Senneville	3.46%	No referendum		
Val-d'Or	Municipality of Sullivan	1.23%	No referendum		
Val-d'Or	Municipality of Vassan	0.39%	No referendum		
Val-d'Or	City of Val-d'Or	0.04%	No referendum		

=== Notes ===
a. In 2005, Cap-aux-Meules held a second referendum in which voters chose to remain in the amalgamated Les-Îles-de-la-Madeleine municipality after all.

b. Only a very small part of the population of Stoke had merged with Sherbrooke

== See also ==
- 21st-century municipal history of Quebec
- 2000–2006 municipal reorganization in Quebec
- 2002–2006 municipal reorganization of Montreal
- List of former municipalities in Quebec
- Merger (politics)
- History of Montreal
