= Quebec City =

Provincial capital of Quebec, Canada

- City and provincial capital
- Ville de Québec (French)
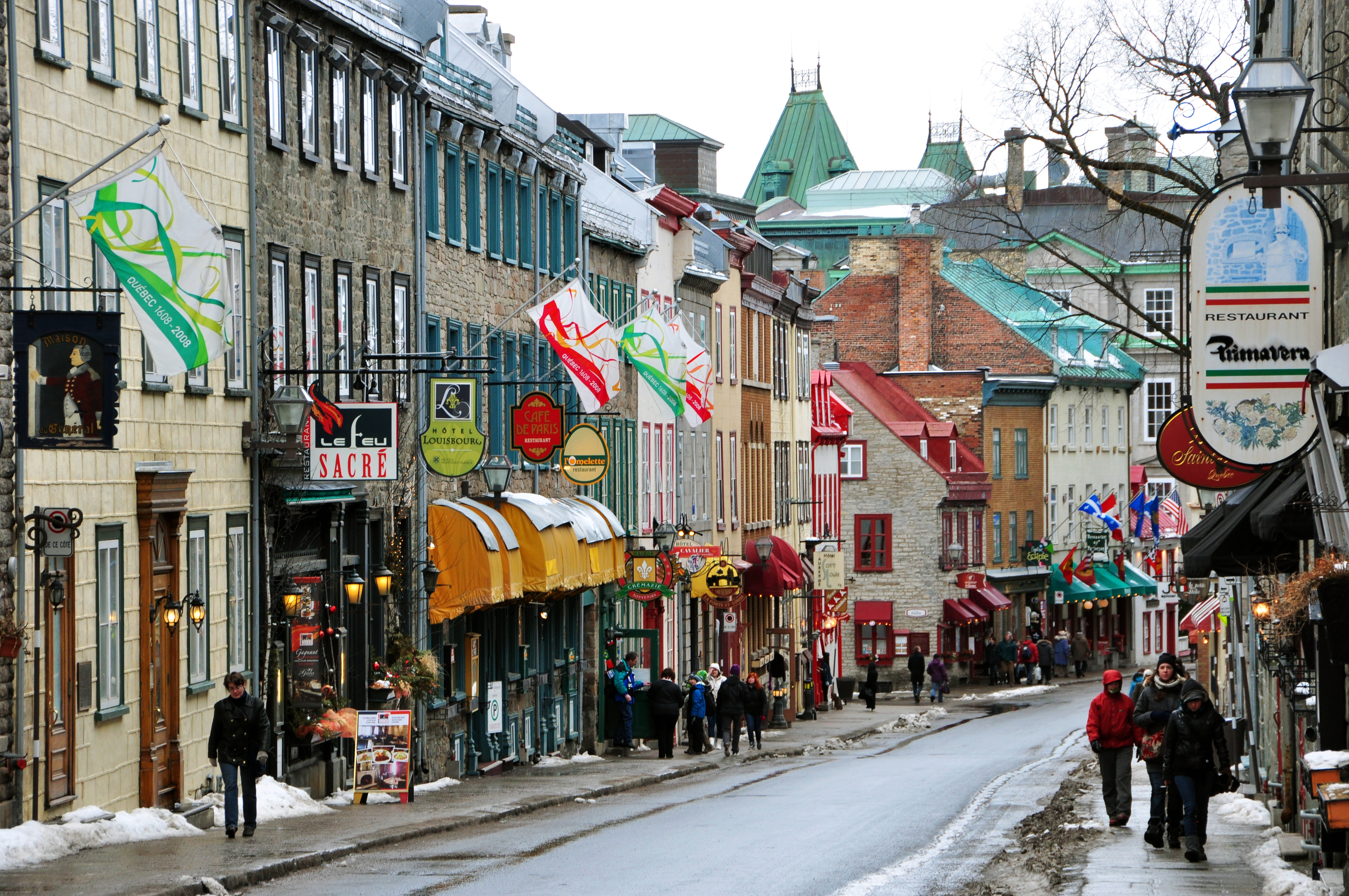
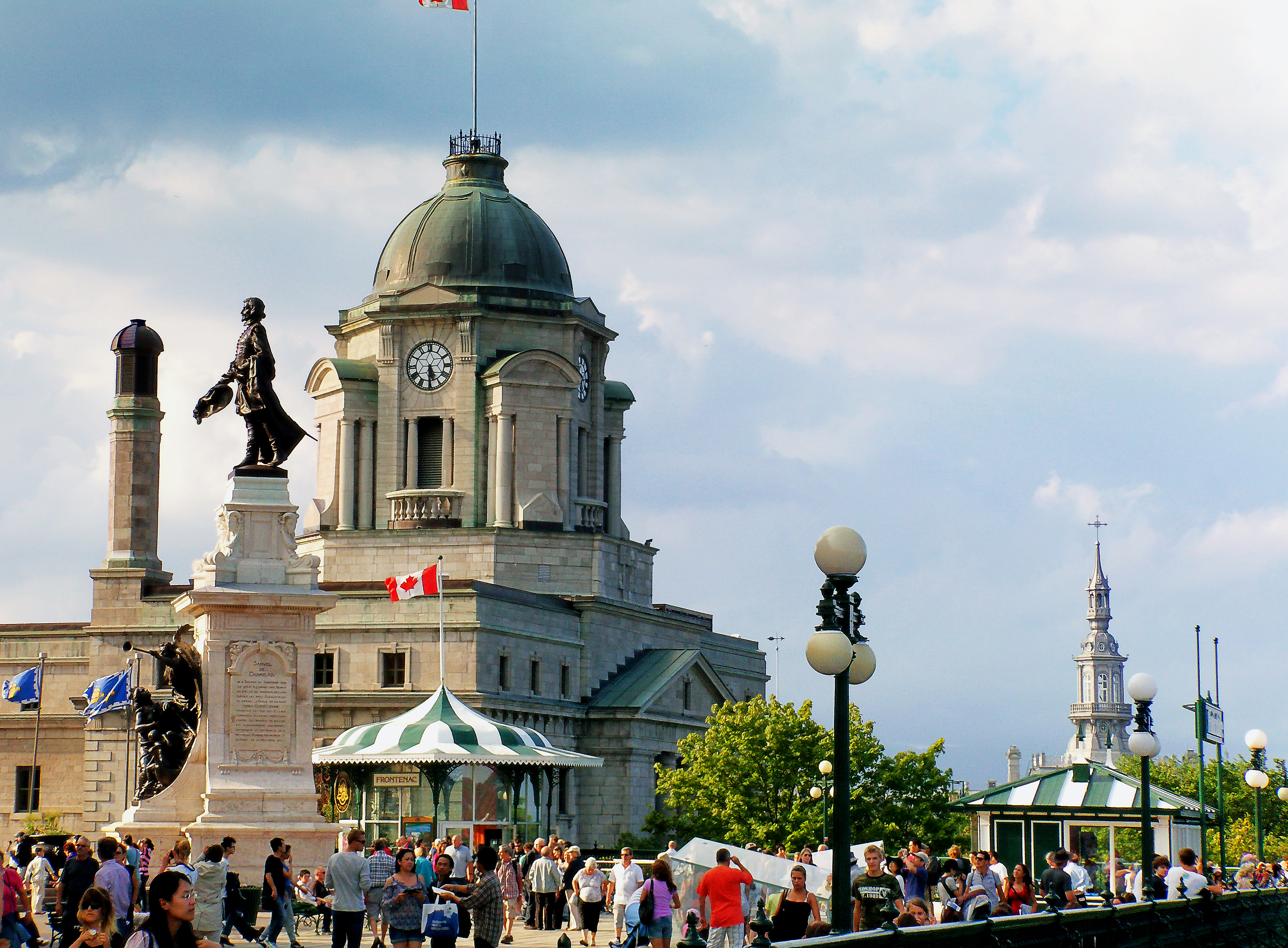
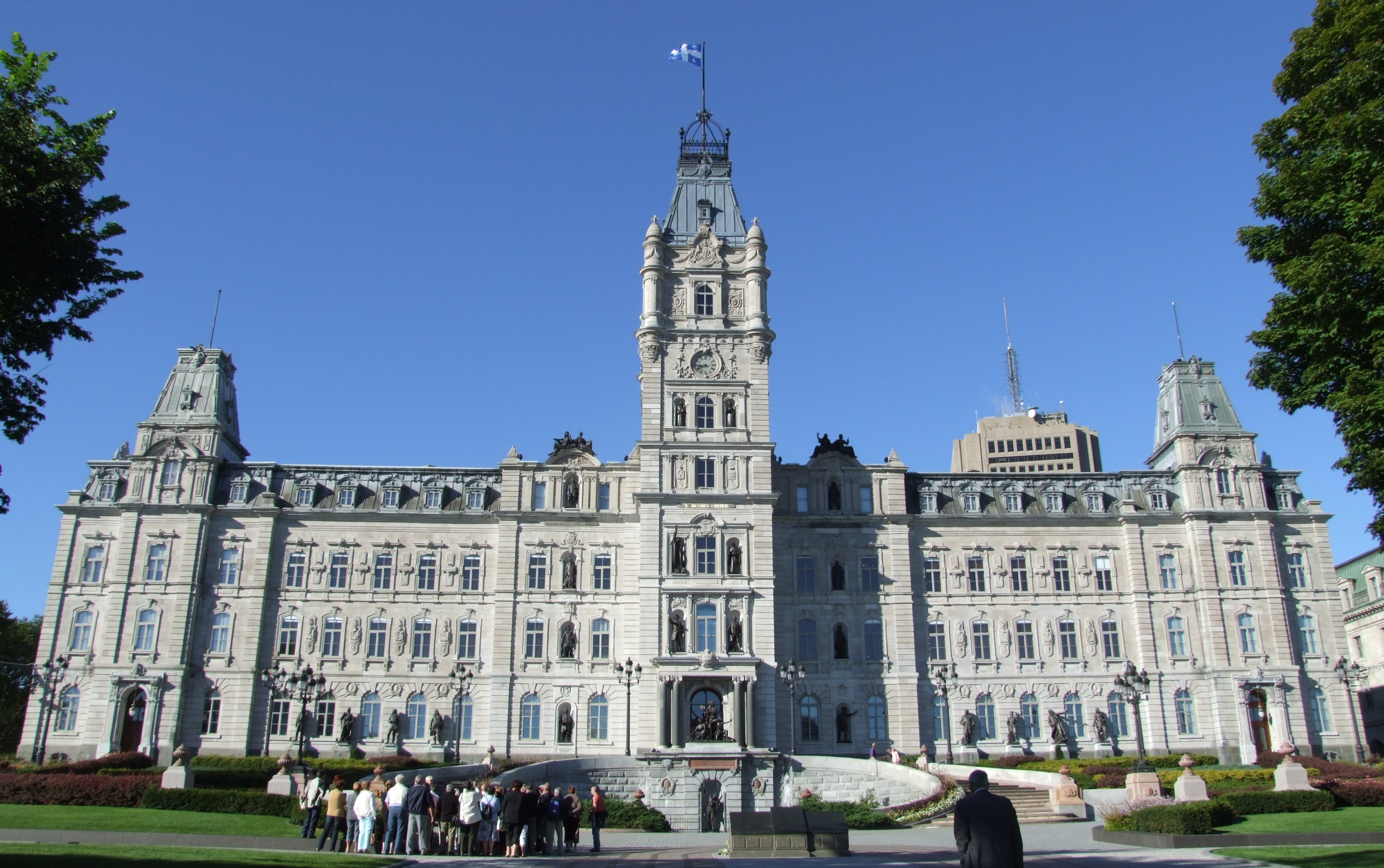
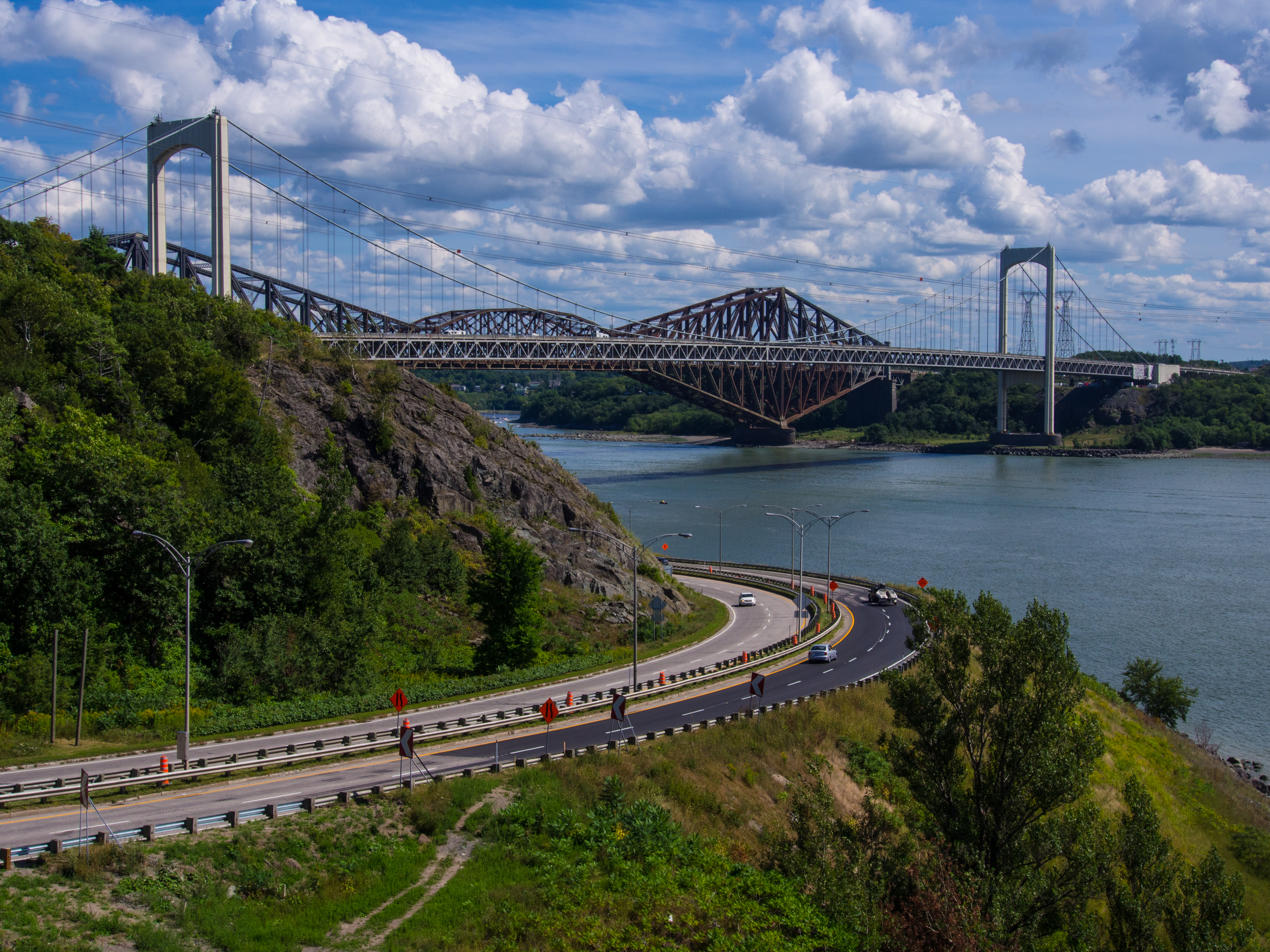
- Skyline of Quebec City Château Frontenac Old Quebec Terrasse Dufferin Quebec Parliament Building Place Royale Pierre Laporte Bridge

- Flag Coat of arms Logo
- Nicknames: La Vieille Capitale
- Motto: Don de Dieu feray valoir ("I shall put God's gift to good use"; the Don de Dieu was Champlain's ship)
- Interactive map of Quebec City
- Location in Quebec Location in Canada Quebec City (North America)
- Coordinates: 46°48′50″N 71°12′29″W
- Country: Canada
- Province: Quebec
- Region: Capitale-Nationale
- Metropolitan community: Communauté métropolitaine de Québec
- Agglomeration: Agglomeration of Quebec City
- Historic countries: Kingdom of France; Kingdom of Great Britain
- First settled: 11 October 1535, by Jacques Cartier
- Founded: 3 July 1608, by Samuel de Champlain
- Constituted: 1 January 2002
- Incorporated: 1832
- Boroughs: List: Beauport; Charlesbourg; La Cité-Limoilou; La Haute-Saint-Charles; Les Rivières; Sainte-Foy–Sillery–Cap-Rouge

Government
  - Type: Quebec City Council
  - Mayor: Bruno Marchand
  - MPs: List: Gérard Deltell (C); Jean-Yves Duclos (L); Joël Godin (C); Gabriel Hardy (C); Steeve Lavoie (L); Joël Lightbound (L); Pierre Paul-Hus (C)
  - MNAs: List: Jonatan Julien (C); Kariane Bourassa (C); Éric Caire (C); Sol Zanetti (QS); Geneviève Guilbault (C); Mario Asselin (C); Étienne Grandmont (QS); Pascal Paradis (Q); Sylvain Lévesque (C)

Area
  - City and provincial capital: 452.30 km^{2} (174.63 sq mi)
  - Land: 453.38 km^{2} (175.05 sq mi)
  - Urban: 442.85 km^{2} (170.99 sq mi)
  - Metro: 3,499.46 km^{2} (1,351.15 sq mi)
- Elevation: 98 m (322 ft)

Population (2021)
  - City and provincial capital: 549,459 (12th)
  - Density: 1,214.8/km^{2} (3,146/sq mi)
  - Urban: 733,156 (8th)
  - Urban density: 1,655.5/km^{2} (4,288/sq mi)
  - Metro: 839,311 (7th)
  - Metro density: 239.8/km^{2} (621/sq mi)
  - Pop 2016–2021: ▲4.1%
- Demonym: Québécois or Québécois de Québec (to distinguish residents of the city from those of the province)

GDP (Nominal, 2021)
  - Metro: CA$52.56 billion (US$42.04 billion)
  - Per capita: CA$62,212 (US$49,769.6)
- Time zone: UTC−05:00 (EST)
  - Summer (DST): UTC−04:00 (EDT)
- Postal codes: G1A to G3K
- Area codes: 418; 581; 367
- Website: www.ville.quebec.qc.ca

UNESCO World Heritage Site
- Official name: Historic District of Old Quebec
- Type: Cultural
- Criteria: iv, vi
- Designated: 1985 (9th session)
- Reference no.: 300
- Region: Europe and North America

Quebec City (Note: /kwɪˈbɛk/ or /kəˈbɛk/; (French pronunciation: [kebɛk])) (French: Ville de Québec) is the capital city of the Canadian province of Quebec. As of 2026, the city has a population of 595,190 and the Quebec City census metropolitan area (including surrounding communities) had a population of 839,311 in 2021. It is the twelfth-largest city and the seventh-largest metropolitan area in Canada. It is also the second-largest city in the province, after Montreal. It has a humid continental climate with warm summers coupled with cold and snowy winters.

Explorer Samuel de Champlain founded a French settlement here in 1608, and adopted the Algonquin name. Quebec City is one of the oldest European settlements in North America. The ramparts surrounding Old Quebec (Vieux-Québec) are the only fortified city walls remaining in the Americas north of Mexico. This area was declared a World Heritage Site by UNESCO in 1985 as the "Historic District of Old Québec".

== Name and usage ==
Common English-language usage distinguishes the city from the province by referring to the former as Quebec City.

According to the Government of Canada, the Government of Quebec, and the Geographical Names Board of Canada, the names of Canadian cities and towns have only one official form. Thus, Québec is officially spelled with an accented é in both French and Canadian English. However, province names can have different forms in English and French. As a result, in English, the federal government style distinguishes the city and province by spelling the city with an acute accent (Québec) and the province without one (Quebec). The government of Quebec spells both names "Québec", including when writing in English.

In French, the two are distinguished in that province names including Quebec generally take definite articles, while city names do not. As a result, the city is Québec and the province is le Québec; "in Quebec City" is à Québec and "in the province of Quebec" is au Québec; and so forth.

The Algonquian people had originally named the area Kébec, an Algonquin language (Note: The Algonquin language is a distinct language of the Algonquian language family, and is not a misspelling.) word meaning "where the river narrows", because the Saint Lawrence River narrows by the promontory of Quebec and its Cape Diamant.

== History ==
=== French regime (1500s–1763) ===
Quebec City is one of the oldest European settlements in North America and the only fortified city north of Mexico whose walls still exist. While many of the major cities in Latin America date from the 16th century, among cities in Canada and the United States, few were created earlier than Quebec City (St. John's, Harbour Grace, Port Royal, St. Augustine, Santa Fe, Jamestown, and Tadoussac).

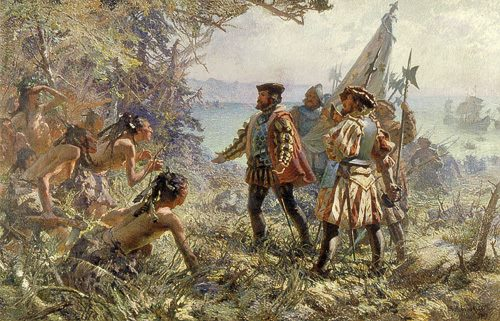
Depiction of Jacques Cartier's meeting with the indigenous people of Stadacona in 1535

It is home to the earliest known French settlement in North America, Fort Charlesbourg-Royal, established in 1541 by explorer Jacques Cartier with some 400 persons but abandoned less than a year later due to the harsh winter and resistance of indigenous inhabitants to colonial incursion on their land. The fort was at the mouth of the Rivière du Cap Rouge, in the suburban former town of Cap-Rouge (which merged into Quebec City in 2002).

Quebec was founded by Samuel de Champlain, a French explorer and diplomat, on 3 July 1608, and at the site of a long abandoned St. Lawrence Iroquoian settlement called Stadacona. Champlain, who came to be called "The Father of New France", served as its administrator for the rest of his life.

The name "Canada" was given to the colony that developed around the settlement at Quebec. Although the Acadian settlement at Port-Royal was established three years earlier, Quebec came to be known as the cradle of North America's Francophone population. The location seemed favourable to the establishment of a permanent colony.

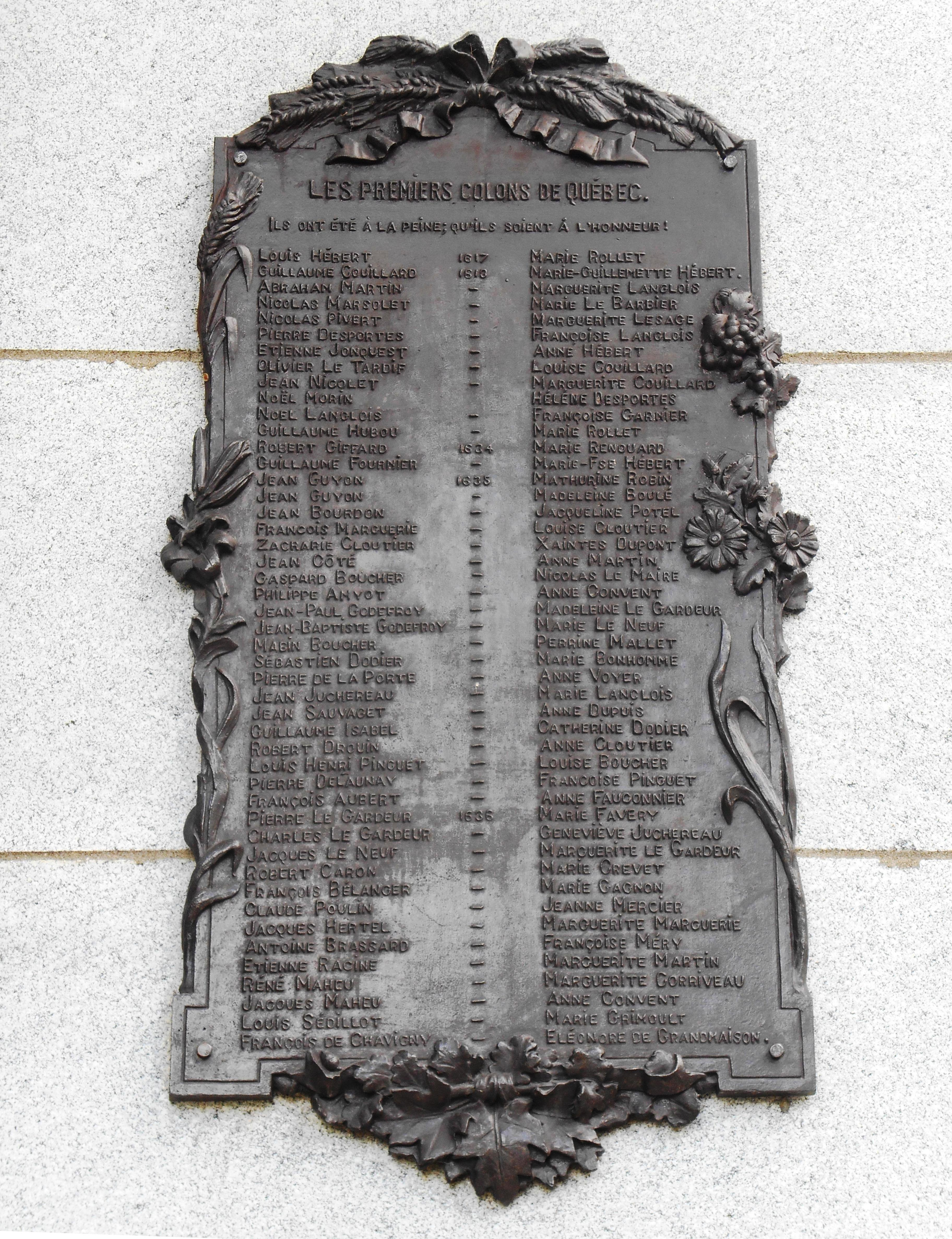
Plaque honouring the first settlers of Québec City. (affixed to back of monument to Guillaume Couillard, which accompanies those to Louis Hébert and Marie Rollet). Parc Montmorency, Québec City.

The population of the settlement remained small for decades. In 1629 it was captured by English privateers, led by David Kirke, during the Anglo-French War. Samuel de Champlain argued that the English seizing of French lands was illegal as the war had already ended, and worked to have them returned to France. As part of the ongoing negotiations following the end of the Anglo-French War, in 1632 the English king Charles I agreed to return captured lands in exchange for Louis XIII paying his wife's dowry. These terms were signed into law with the Treaty of Saint-Germain-en-Laye. The colonies of Canada and Acadia were returned to the French Company of One Hundred Associates.

In 1665, there were 550 people in 70 houses living in the city. One-quarter of the people were members of religious orders: secular priests, Jesuits, Ursulines nuns and the order running the local hospital, Hôtel-Dieu.

Quebec was the headquarters of many raids against New England during the French and Indian Wars. In 1690 the city was attacked by the English, but was successfully defended. In the last of the conflicts, the French and Indian War (Seven Years' War), Quebec was captured by the British in 1759, and held until the end of the war in 1763. In that time many battles and sieges took place: the Battle of Beauport, a French victory (31 July 1759); the Battle of the Plains of Abraham, in which British troops under General James Wolfe defeated the French General Louis-Joseph de Montcalm on 13 September 1759, and shortly thereafter took the city after a short siege. A French counterattack saw a French victory at the Battle of Sainte-Foy (28 April 1760) but the subsequent second Siege of Quebec the following month however saw a final British victory.

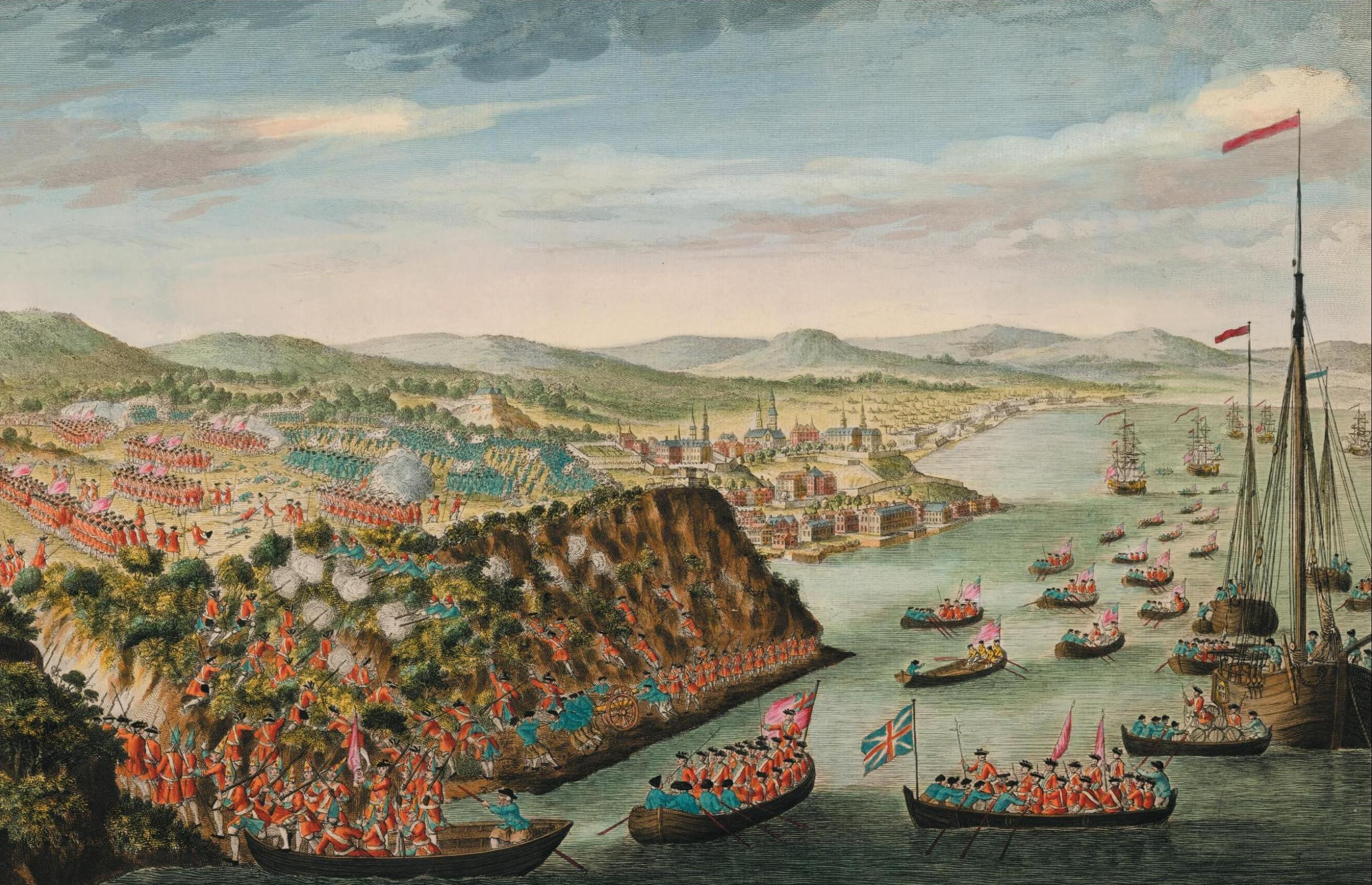
After a campaign of three months British forces captured Quebec City after the Battle of the Plains of Abraham.

France ceded New France, including the city, to Britain in 1763, when the French and Indian War officially ended.

At the end of French rule, Quebec was a town of 8,000 inhabitants, surrounded by forests, villages, fields and pastures. The town was distinguished by its monumental architecture, fortifications, and affluent homes of masonry and shacks in the suburbs of Saint-Jean and Saint-Roch. Despite its urbanity and its status as capital, Quebec remained a small city with close ties to its rural surroundings. Nearby inhabitants traded their farm surpluses and firewood for imported goods from France at the two city markets.

=== British and Canadian rule (1763–present) ===
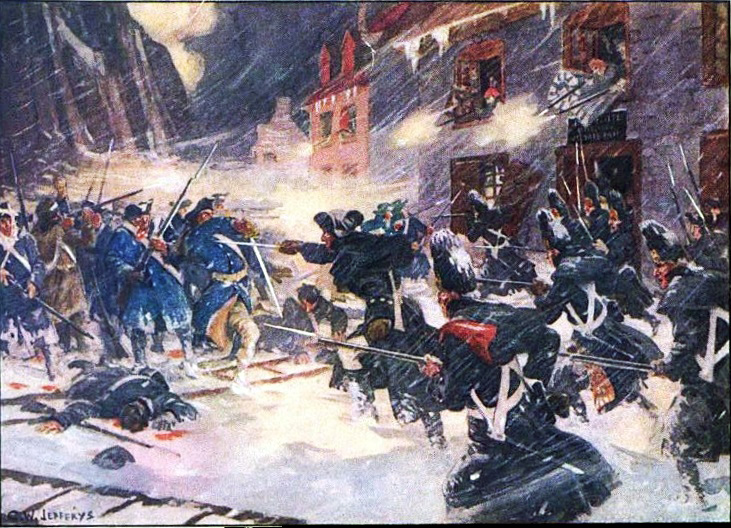
British regulars and Canadian militia engage the Continental Army in the streets of the city. The Americans' failure to take Quebec in 1775 led to the end of their campaign in Canada.

During the American Revolution, revolutionary troops from the southern colonies assaulted the British garrison in the city in the hope that the peoples of Quebec would rise and join the American Revolution so that Canada would join the Continental Congress, along with the other British colonies of continental North America. The American invasion failed, however, and the war resulted in a permanent split of British North America into two entitles: the newly independent United States of America, and those colonies (including Quebec) that remained under British control, which would later become the country of Canada.

The city itself was not attacked during the War of 1812, when the United States again attempted to annex Canadian lands. Amid fears of another American attack on Quebec City, construction of the Citadelle of Quebec began in 1820. The Americans did not attack Canada after the War of 1812, but the Citadelle continued to house a large British garrison until 1871. It is still in use by the military and is also a tourist attraction.

Until the late 18th century Québec was the most populous city in present-day Canada. As of the census of 1790, Montreal surpassed it with 18,000 inhabitants, but Quebec, which had about 14,000 of population at that time, remained the administrative capital of the former New France. It was then made the capital of Lower Canada by the Constitutional Act of 1791. From 1841 to 1867, the capital of the Province of Canada rotated between Kingston, Montreal, Toronto, Ottawa and Quebec City (from 1851 to 1855 and from 1859 to 1865).

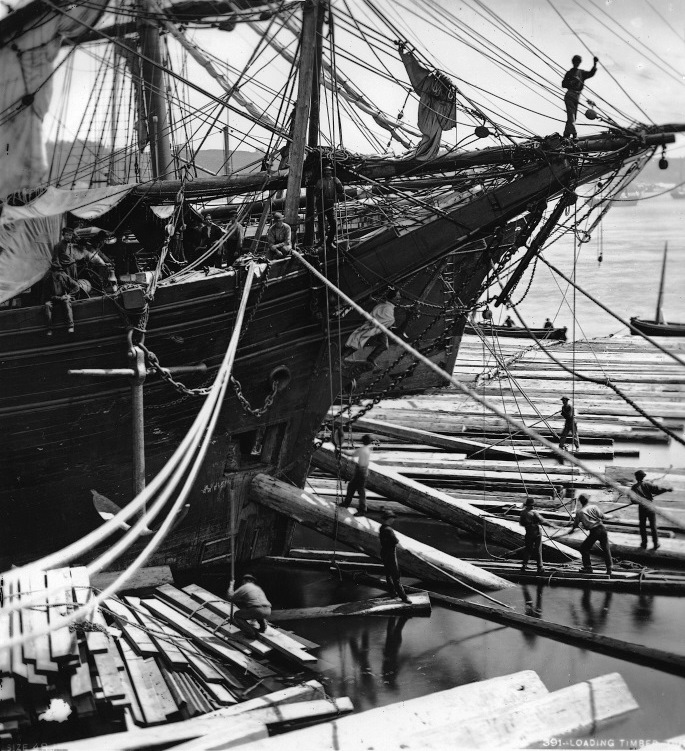
Square timber being loaded on a sail ship at the port of Québec in 1872

The city experienced an economic golden age in the 1800s, due to its favorable location on the Saint Lawrence River which gave rise to industries of wooden sailing ships manufacture, export of squared timber logs to Europe, as well as associated enterprises such as sawmills. However, by the 1870s, Québec City entered a period of economic decline. Contributing factors included the rise of steel-hulled steamships, the expansion of railroads at the expense of waterways for continental commerce; the depletion of forest resources near major rivers upstream of Québec City and in the west of the province, which were transported to Québec's port by log driving; the construction of locks on the Saint Lawrence Seaway, opening up trade routes to the U.S. from Montreal; and the city's inability to retain immigrant populations. This unfavourable context, coupled with the departure of the British army from the city's Citadel in 1871, contributed to the exodus of English speaking populations, such as local bourgeoisie of Scottish origin or workers of Irish background, to Montreal in the second half of the 19th century. Anglophones made up approximately 40% of the city's population in 1861, but 16% in 1901.

Before the Royal Military College of Canada was established in 1876, the only French-speaking officer training school was the Quebec City School of Military Instruction, founded in 1864. The school was retained at Confederation, in 1867. In 1868, The School of Artillery was formed in Montreal.

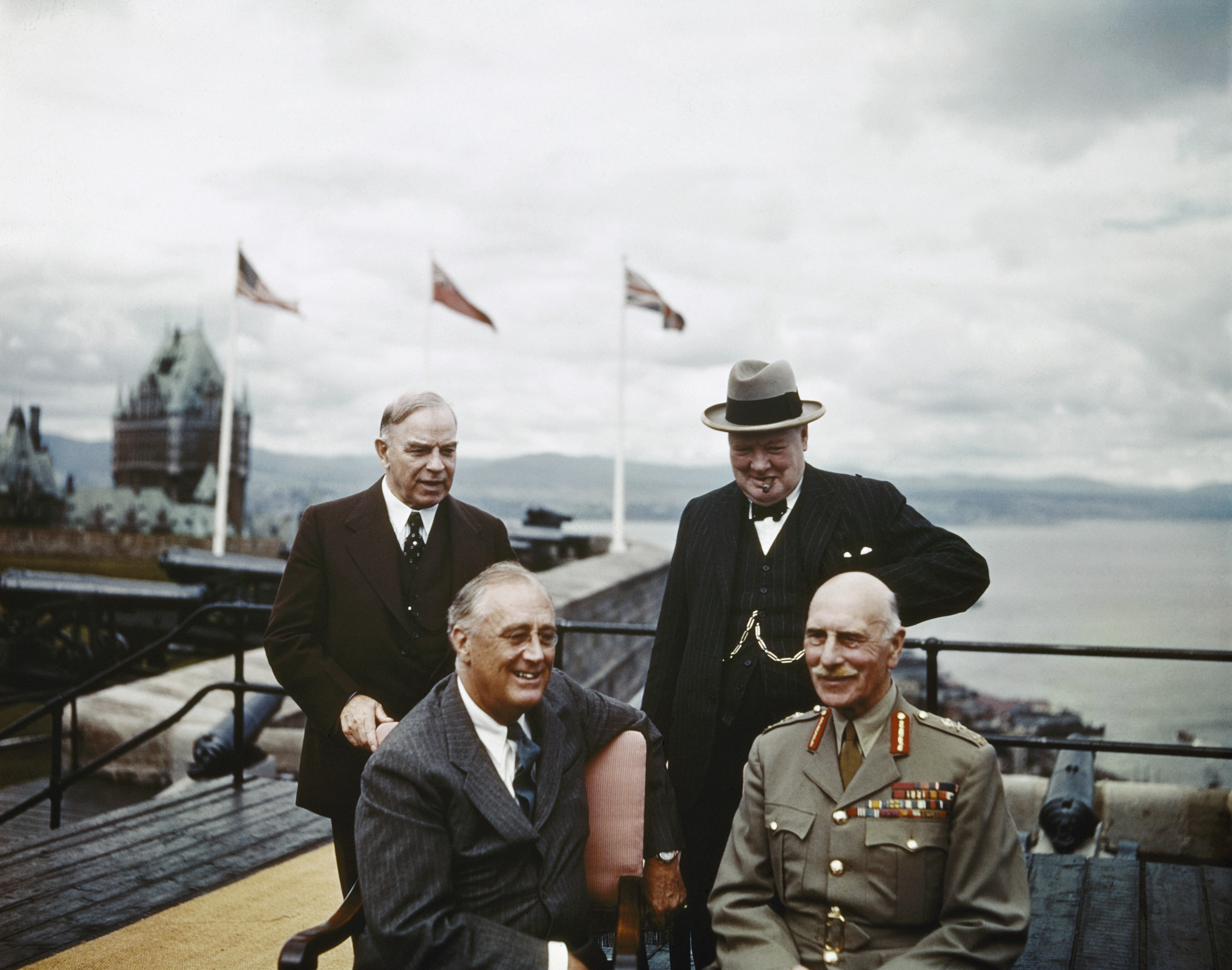
Mackenzie King, Franklin D. Roosevelt, Winston Churchill, and the Earl of Athlone (left to right) at the First Quebec Conference, a secret military conference held in World War II

The Quebec Conference on Canadian Confederation was held in the city in 1864. In 1867, Queen Victoria chose Ottawa as the definite capital of the Dominion of Canada, while Quebec City was confirmed as the capital of the newly created province of Quebec.

During World War II, two conferences were held in Quebec City. The First Quebec Conference was held in 1943 with Franklin D. Roosevelt (President of the United States), Winston Churchill (Prime Minister of the United Kingdom), William Lyon Mackenzie King (Prime Minister of Canada) and T. V. Soong (minister of foreign affairs of China). The Second Quebec Conference was held in 1944 and was attended by Churchill and Roosevelt. They took place in the buildings of the Citadelle and at the nearby Château Frontenac. A large part of the D-Day landing plans were made during those meetings.

Until 2002, Quebec was a mostly urbanized city and its territory coterminous with today's borough of La Cité-Limoilou. The Government of Quebec then mandated a municipal reorganization in the province, and many suburbs of the north shore of the Saint-Lawrence were merged into Quebec City, taking the form of boroughs, thus constituting the boundary of present-day Québec City. In 2008 the city celebrated its 400th anniversary and was gifted funds for festivities and construction projects by provincial and federal governments, as well as public artwork by various entities, including foreign countries.

== Geography ==
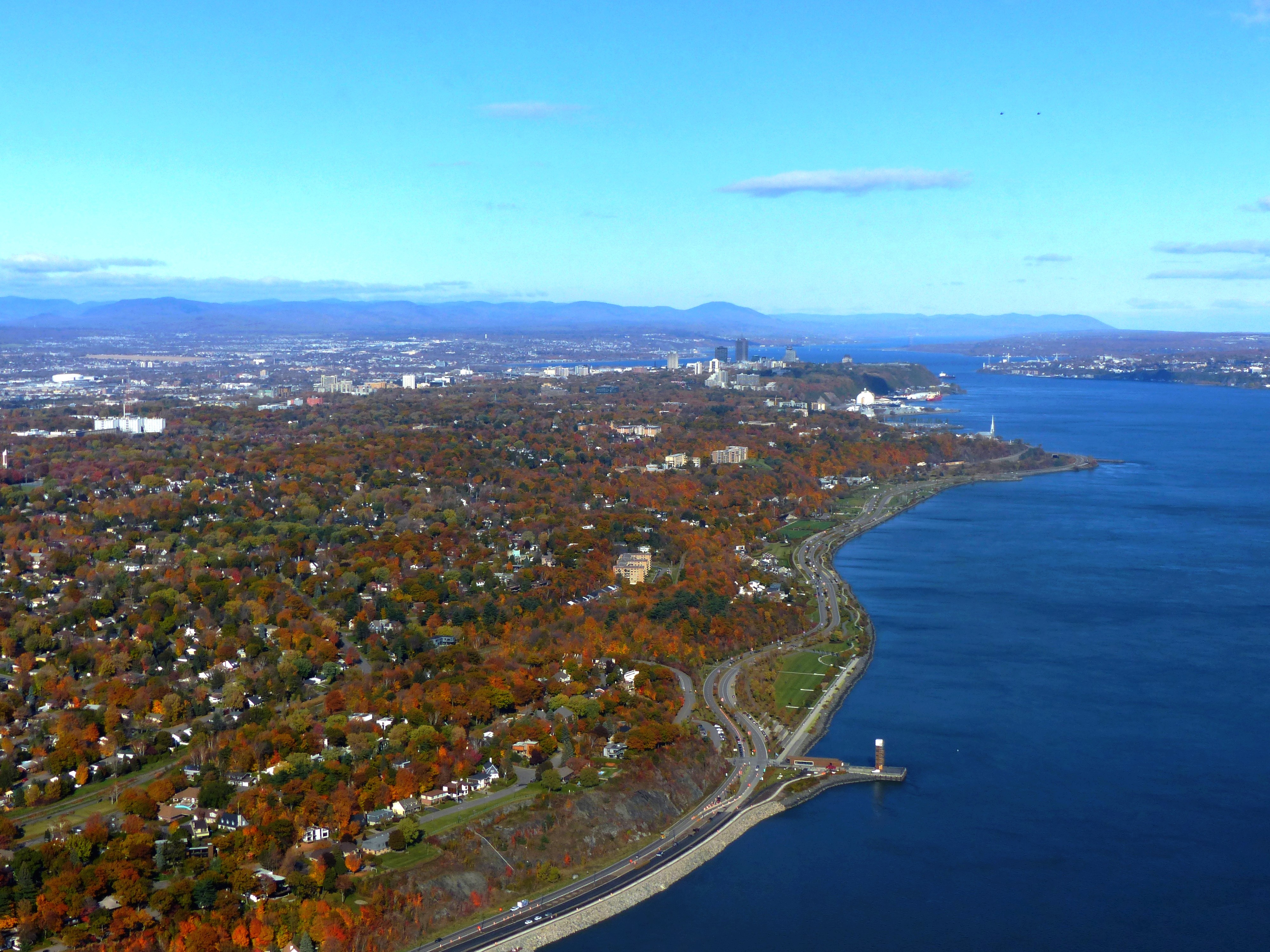
The Promontory of Quebec at the narrowing of the Saint Lawrence River and surrounded by the Laurentian Mountains

Quebec City was built on the north bank of the Saint Lawrence River, where it narrows and meets the mouth of the Saint-Charles River. Old Quebec is located on top and at the foot of Cap-Diamant, which is on the eastern edge of a plateau called the promontory of Quebec (Quebec hill). Because of this topographic feature, the oldest and most urbanized borough of La Cité-Limoilou can be divided into upper and lower town. North of the hill, the Saint Lawrence Lowlands is flat and has rich, arable soil. Past this valley, the Laurentian Mountains lie to the north of the city but its foothills are within the municipal limits.

The Plains of Abraham are located on the southeastern extremity of the plateau, where high stone walls were integrated during colonial days. On the northern foot of the promontory, the lower town neighbourhoods of Saint-Roch and Saint-Sauveur, traditionally working class, are separated from uptown's Saint-Jean-Baptiste and Saint-Sacrement by a woody area attested as Coteau Sainte-Geneviève.

The area was affected by the 1925 Charlevoix–Kamouraska earthquake.

The administrative region in which it is situated is officially referred to as Capitale-Nationale, and the term "national capital" is used to refer to Quebec City itself at the provincial level.

=== Climate ===
Quebec City

Climate chart (precipitation, max. and min. temperature)
J	F	M	A	M	J	J	A	S	O	N	D
87 −7 −17	66 −5 −16	78 0 −9	94 8 −1	92 18 6	115 23 11	119 25 14	109 24 13	111 19 8	116 11 2	91 4 −4	96 −3 −11
- █ Average max. and min. temperatures in °C
- █ Precipitation totals in mm
- Source: Environment and Climate Change Canada
Imperial conversion
J	F	M	A	M	J	J	A	S	O	N	D
3.4 19 2	2.6 23 4	3.1 33 15	3.7 47 30	3.6 64 42	4.5 73 51	4.7 77 57	4.3 75 55	4.4 66 47	4.6 52 36	3.6 38 25	3.8 26 11
- █ Average max. and min. temperatures in °F
- █ Precipitation totals in inches

Quebec City is classified as a hemiboreal humid continental climate (Köppen climate classification Dfb, Trewartha Dcbc).

Quebec City experiences four distinct seasons. Summers are warm and occasionally hot, with periods of hotter temperatures which compounded with the high humidity, create a high heat index that belies the average high of 22–25 °C (72–77 °F) and lows of 11–13 °C (52–55 °F). Winters are cold, windy and snowy with average high temperatures −5 to −8 °C (23 to 18 °F) and lows −13 to −18 °C (9 to 0 °F). Spring and fall, although short, bring chilly to warm temperatures. Late heat waves as well as "Indian summers" are a common occurrence.

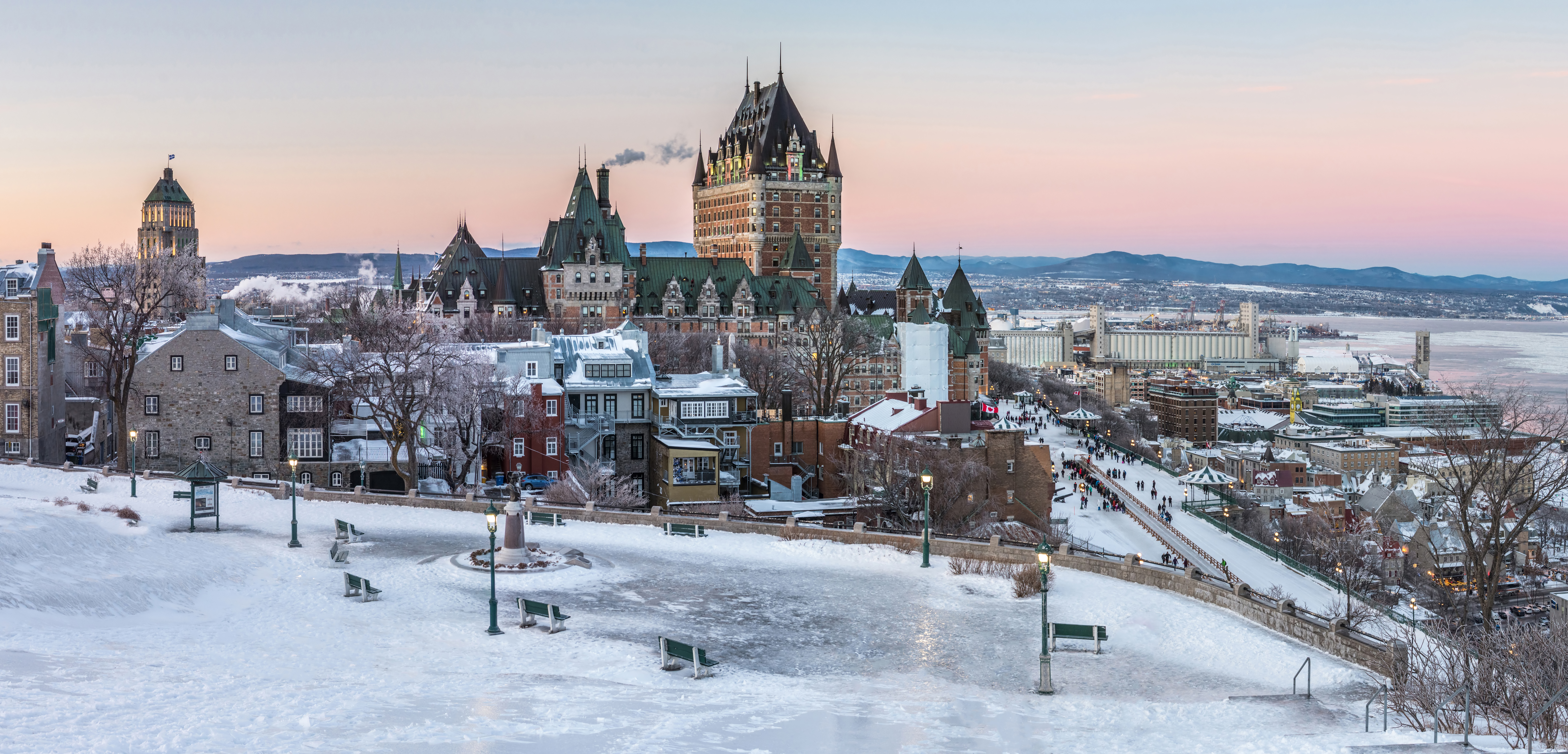
Winter scene at the Château Frontenac

On average, Quebec City receives 1,190 millimetres (46.85 in) of precipitation, of which 899 millimetres (35.39 in) is rain and 303 millimetres (11.93 in) is the melt from 316 centimetres (124.4 in) of snowfall per annum. (Note: Although snow is measured in cm the melted snow (water equivalent) is measured in mm and added to the rainfall to obtain the total precipitation. An approximation of the water equivalent can be made by dividing the snow depth by ten. Thus 1 cm (0.4 in) of snow is equivalent to approximately 1 mm (0.04 in) of water. See snow gauge, and) The city experiences around 1,916 hours of bright sunshine annually or 41.5% of possible sunshine, with summer being the sunniest, but also slightly the wettest season. During winter, snow generally stays on the ground from the end of November till mid-April.

The coldest temperature ever recorded was −36.7 °C (−34.1 °F) on 10 January 1890 and 14 January 2015. The highest temperature ever recorded in Quebec City was 36.1 °C (97.0 °F) on 17 July 1953., with the current weather station at the airport having a record of 35.6 °C (96.1 °F) the same day. The record highest daily minimum was 23.2 °C (73.8 °F) recorded 10 July 1955. The record highest dew point was 28.2 °C (82.8 °F) recorded 2 July 2002. The most humid month was July 2023 with an average dew point of 17.7 °C (63.9 °F). The warmest month was July 2010 with a recorded average mean temperature of 21.6 °C (70.9 °F). July 1959 recorded the warmest monthly average daily maximum of 28.7 °C (83.7 °F). July 2023 recorded the warmest monthly average daily minimum of 16.0 °C (60.8 °F). July 2019 saw no daily maximum temperature below 22.1 °C (71.8 °F) during the entire month. July 2020 recorded no temperature below 11.0 °C (51.8 °F) throughout the month. The month of August 2015 recorded no dew point below 10.3 °C (50.5 °F).

The lowest yearly maximum dew point is 20.0 °C (68.0 °F) recorded in 1960. The lowest yearly maximum daily minimum temperature is 16.7 °C (62.1 °F) recorded in 1956 and 1962. The lowest yearly maximum temperature is 28.9 °C (84.0 °F) recorded in 1954 and 1958.

The average yearly maximum dew point is 23.1 °C (73.6 °F) and the average yearly maximum daily minimum temperature is 20.3 °C (68.5 °F).

Climate data for Sainte-Foy, Quebec City (Québec City Jean Lesage International Airport) WMO ID: 71708; coordinates 46°48′N 71°23′W; elevation: 74.4 m (244 ft); 1991–2020 normals, extremes 1875–present (Note: Based on station coordinates provided by Environment and Climate Change Canada, climate data was recorded in the area of Old Quebec from August 1875 to February 1959, and at Québec City Jean Lesage International Airport from March 1943 to present.)
Month	Jan	Feb	Mar	Apr	May	Jun	Jul	Aug	Sep	Oct	Nov	Dec	Year
Record high humidex	10.6	11.7	19.9	32.9	40.3	44.1	49.2	49.3	40.1	30.9	24.9	14.6	49.3
Record high °C (°F)	17.7 (63.9)	12.0 (53.6)	18.3 (64.9)	29.9 (85.8)	33.1 (91.6)	34.2 (93.6)	35.6 (96.1)	34.4 (93.9)	33.9 (93.0)	28.3 (82.9)	22.9 (73.2)	13.9 (57.0)	35.6 (96.1)
Mean maximum °C (°F)	4.6 (40.3)	4.6 (40.3)	9.5 (49.1)	19.9 (67.8)	28.0 (82.4)	30.4 (86.7)	31.1 (88.0)	30.0 (86.0)	27.1 (80.8)	20.8 (69.4)	14.6 (58.3)	6.2 (43.2)	31.9 (89.4)
Mean daily maximum °C (°F)	−7.1 (19.2)	−5.0 (23.0)	0.4 (32.7)	8.3 (46.9)	17.5 (63.5)	22.5 (72.5)	25.0 (77.0)	24.0 (75.2)	19.1 (66.4)	11.3 (52.3)	3.6 (38.5)	−3.3 (26.1)	9.7 (49.5)
Daily mean °C (°F)	−11.9 (10.6)	−10.4 (13.3)	−4.5 (23.9)	3.5 (38.3)	11.6 (52.9)	16.7 (62.1)	19.5 (67.1)	18.4 (65.1)	13.7 (56.7)	6.8 (44.2)	−0.1 (31.8)	−7.3 (18.9)	4.7 (40.5)
Mean daily minimum °C (°F)	−16.7 (1.9)	−15.7 (3.7)	−9.3 (15.3)	−1.2 (29.8)	5.6 (42.1)	10.8 (51.4)	13.9 (57.0)	12.8 (55.0)	8.3 (46.9)	2.4 (36.3)	−3.8 (25.2)	−11.4 (11.5)	−0.4 (31.3)
Mean minimum °C (°F)	−29.3 (−20.7)	−27.2 (−17.0)	−22.4 (−8.3)	−9.0 (15.8)	−1.2 (29.8)	4.6 (40.3)	8.4 (47.1)	6.7 (44.1)	0.8 (33.4)	−4.6 (23.7)	−13.6 (7.5)	−24.3 (−11.7)	−30.4 (−22.7)
Record low °C (°F)	−36.7 (−34.1)	−36.1 (−33.0)	−32.6 (−26.7)	−19.3 (−2.7)	−7.8 (18.0)	−1.3 (29.7)	3.9 (39.0)	2.2 (36.0)	−4.8 (23.4)	−10.0 (14.0)	−24.0 (−11.2)	−33.4 (−28.1)	−36.7 (−34.1)
Record low wind chill	−51.1	−52.4	−41.0	−29.0	−13.6	−1.7	0.0	0.0	−7.8	−17.3	−30.8	−48.4	−52.4
Average precipitation mm (inches)	86.7 (3.41)	65.7 (2.59)	77.7 (3.06)	94.4 (3.72)	91.8 (3.61)	114.7 (4.52)	118.7 (4.67)	108.7 (4.28)	111.3 (4.38)	115.8 (4.56)	90.9 (3.58)	96.2 (3.79)	1,172.6 (46.17)
Average rainfall mm (inches)	24.6 (0.97)	13.8 (0.54)	30.2 (1.19)	71.3 (2.81)	—	—	—	—	—	—	61.7 (2.43)	33.7 (1.33)	—
Average snowfall cm (inches)	69.1 (27.2)	64.3 (25.3)	50.3 (19.8)	13.1 (5.2)	—	—	—	—	—	—	25.6 (10.1)	75.7 (29.8)	—
Average precipitation days (≥ 0.2 mm)	18.2	14.7	14.0	13.7	13.6	13.5	14.7	13.0	12.3	14.9	14.9	18.5	175.9
Average rainy days (≥ 0.2 mm)	3.3	2.2	4.3	10.3	—	—	—	—	—	—	9.5	4.4	—
Average snowy days (≥ 0.2 cm)	15.4	13.2	10.2	4	—	—	—	—	—	—	7.0	16.5	—
Average relative humidity (%) (at 1500 LST)	70.0	65.5	61.1	56.5	52.2	56.9	59.3	60.1	62.7	65.4	70.6	75.1	63.0
Average dew point °C (°F)	−15.2 (4.6)	−14.1 (6.6)	−9.0 (15.8)	−2.7 (27.1)	4.7 (40.5)	11.0 (51.8)	14.6 (58.3)	13.9 (57.0)	9.9 (49.8)	3.1 (37.6)	−3.3 (26.1)	−9.9 (14.2)	0.3 (32.5)
Mean monthly sunshine hours	98.9	121.2	152.0	170.6	211.1	234.7	252.3	232.0	163.0	122.0	76.6	81.9	1,916.3
Percentage possible sunshine	35.5	41.8	41.3	41.9	45.3	49.6	52.7	52.7	43.1	36.0	27.1	30.7	41.5
Average ultraviolet index	1	2	3	4	6	7	7	6	5	3	1	1	4
Source 1: Environment and Climate Change Canada (sun 1981–2010) (extremes 1875–1959} and Weather Atlas (UV index)
Source 2: weatherstats.ca (for dewpoint and monthly/yearly average absolute maximum/minimum temperature)

=== Boroughs and neighbourhoods ===
Map of the six boroughs that make up Quebec City

On 1 January 2002, the 12 former towns of Sainte-Foy, Beauport, Charlesbourg, Sillery, Loretteville, Val-Bélair, Cap-Rouge, Saint-Émile, Vanier, L'Ancienne-Lorette, Saint-Augustin-de-Desmaures and Lac-Saint-Charles were annexed by Quebec City. This was one of several municipal mergers which took place across Quebec on that date. Following a demerger referendum, L'Ancienne-Lorette and Saint-Augustin-de-Desmaures were reconstituted as separate municipalities on 1 January 2006, but the other former municipalities remain part of Quebec City. On 1 November 2009, Quebec City re-organized its boroughs, reducing the number from 8 to 6.

Quebec City's six boroughs (French: arrondissements) are further divided into 35 neighbourhoods (French: quartiers). In most cases, the name of the latter remained the same as the historical town (French: ville) or parish municipality it replaced. Neighbourhoods each elect their own council, whose powers rest in public consultations.

Compared to many other cities in North America, there is less variation between average household incomes between the neighbourhoods. However, some disparities exist. The southwest former cities of Sillery, Cap-Rouge and Sainte-Foy are considered to be the wealthiest, along with some parts of Montcalm and Old Quebec.

The city's traditional working-class areas are found in the lower town below Old Quebec (Saint-Sauveur and Saint-Roch) and directly across the Saint-Charles River to the north (Vanier and Limoilou). However, parts of Limoilou, Saint-Sauveur and particularly Saint-Roch have seen gentrification in the last 20 years, attracting young professionals and the construction of new offices and condos.

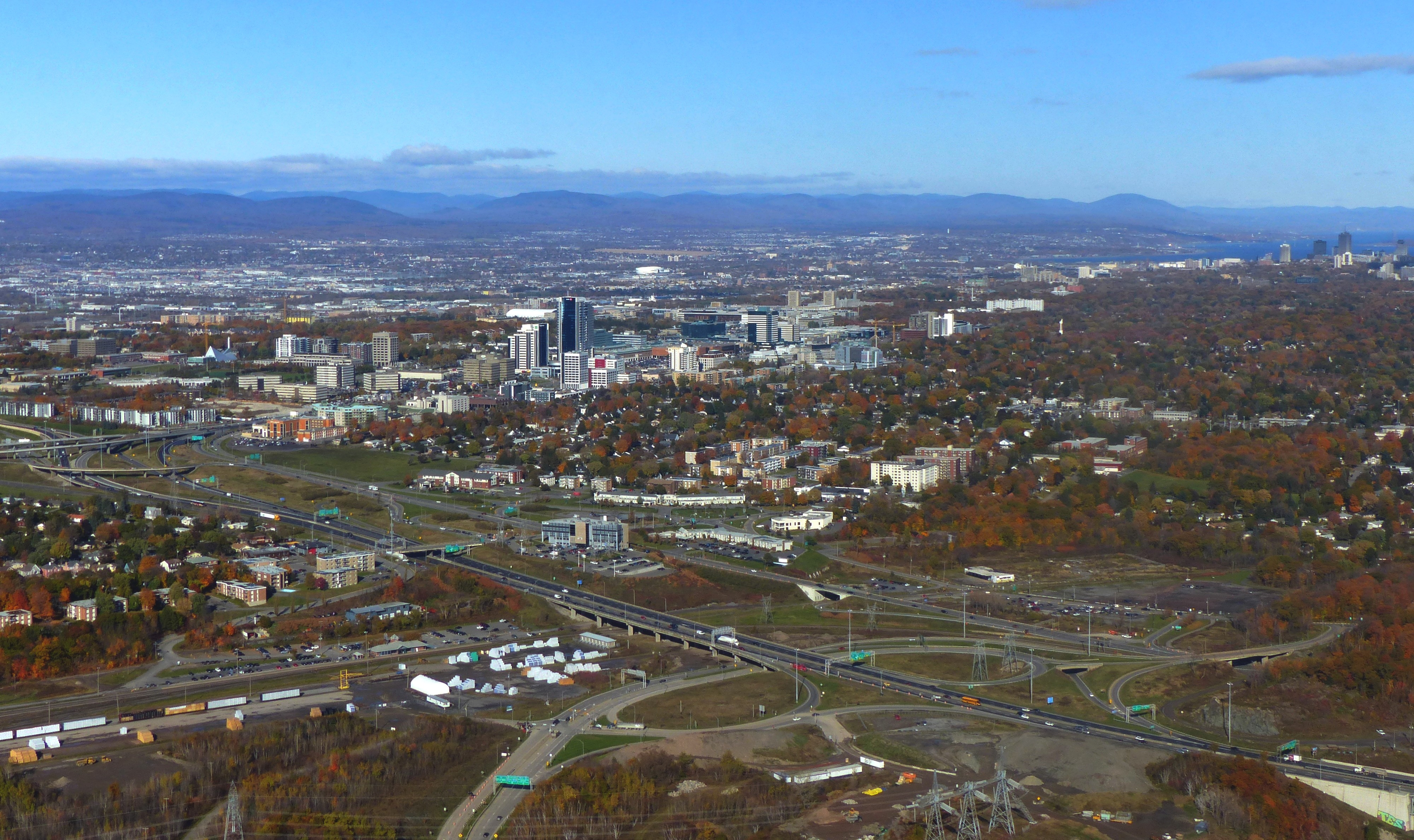
North-east aerial view from the Quebec Bridge area. The foreground shows the Sainte-Foy neighbourhood of Saint-Louis and the modern buildings of boulevard Laurier.

Northern sections (Loretteville, Val-Bélair) and eastern sections (Beauport, Charlesbourg) are mostly a mix of middle-class residential suburbs with industrial pockets.

Boroughs	Neighbourhoods
1 La Cité-Limoilou	La Cité: 1-1 Vieux-Québec–Cap-Blanc–colline Parlementaire · 1-2 Saint-Roch · 1-3 Saint-Jean-Baptiste · 1-4 Montcalm · 1-5 Saint-Sauveur · 1-6 Saint-Sacrement · Limoilou: 6-1 Vieux-Limoilou · 6-2 Lairet · 6-3 Maizerets
2 Les Rivières	2-1 Neufchâtel-Est–Lebourgneuf · 2-2 Duberger-Les Saules · 2-3 Vanier
3 Sainte-Foy–Sillery–Cap-Rouge	3-1 Sillery · 3-2 Cité universitaire · 3-3 Saint-Louis · 3-4 Plateau · 3-5 Pointe-de-Ste-Foy 8-2 · L'Aéroport · 8-3 Cap-Rouge
4 Charlesbourg	4-1 Notre-Dame-des-Laurentides · 4-2 Quartier 4-2 · 4-3 Quartier 4-3 · 4-4 Jésuites, Quebec City · 4-5 Quartier 4-5 · 4-6 Quartier 4–6
5 Beauport	5-1 Quartier 5-1 · 5-2 Quartier 5-2 · 5-3 Chutes-Montmorency · 5-4 Quartier 5-4 · 5-5 Vieux-Moulin
7 La Haute-Saint-Charles	7-1 Lac-Saint-Charles · 7-2 Saint-Émile · 7-3 Loretteville · 7-4 Des Châtels · 8-1 Val-Bélair

== Demographics ==
Quebec City
Year	Pop.	±%
1665	547	—
1667	444	−18.8%
1681	1,345	+202.9%
1685	1,205	−10.4%
1688	1,407	+16.8%
1692	1,570	+11.6%
1695	1,549	−1.3%
1698	1,988	+28.3%
1706	1,771	−10.9%
1739	4,603	+159.9%
1754	8,001	+73.8%
1765	8,967	+12.1%
1790	14,000	+56.1%
1825	22,101	+57.9%
1851	42,052	+90.3%
1861	51,109	+21.5%
1871	59,699	+16.8%
1881	62,446	+4.6%
1891^{a}	63,090	+1.0%
1901	68,940	+9.3%
1911^{b}	78,118	+13.3%
1921^{c}	95,193	+21.9%
1931	130,594	+37.2%
1941	150,757	+15.4%
1951	164,016	+8.8%
1956	170,703	+4.1%
1961	171,979	+0.7%
1966	166,984	−2.9%
1971^{d}	186,088	+11.4%
1976^{e}	177,082	−4.8%
1981	165,968	−6.3%
1986	164,580	−0.8%
1991	167,517	+1.8%
1996	167,264	−0.2%
2001	169,076	+1.1%
2006^{f}	491,142	+190.5%
2011	516,622	+5.2%
2016	531,902	+3.0%
2021	549,459	+3.3%
^{a} Quebec City annexed the Village of Saint-Sauveur-de-Québec^{b}Quebec City annexed the Town of Limoilou and the Village of Saint-Malo^{c}Quebec City annexed the Town of Montcalm^{d}Quebec City annexed the Town of Duberger and the Town of Les Saules^{e}Quebec City annexed the Town of Neufchâtel and the Municipality of Charlesbourg-Ouest^{f}Quebec City annexed the cities of Beauport, Cap-Rouge, Charlesbourg, Lac-Saint-Charles, Loretteville, Saint-Émile, Sainte-Foy, Sillery, Val-Bélair and Vanier

Quebec City (in its present city boundaries)
Year	Pop.	±%
1871	76,593	—
1881	80,249	+4.8%
1891	80,546	+0.4%
1901	88,615	+10.0%
1911	102,214	+15.3%
1921	122,698	+20.0%
1931	168,249	+37.1%
1941	199,588	+18.6%
1951	245,742	+23.1%
1956	279,521	+13.7%
1961	321,917	+15.2%
1966	372,373	+15.7%
1971	408,440	+9.7%
1976	429,757	+5.2%
1981	434,980	+1.2%
1986	440,598	+1.3%
1991	461,894	+4.8%
1996	473,569	+2.5%
2001	476,330	+0.6%
2006	491,142	+3.1%
2011	516,622	+5.2%
2016	531,902	+3.0%
2021	549,459	+3.3%

In the 2021 Census of Population conducted by Statistics Canada, Québec had a population of 549,459 living in 265,711 of its 283,219 total private dwellings, a change of 3.3% from its 2016 population of 531,902. With a land area of 452.3 km^{2} (174.6 sq mi), it had a population density of 1,214.8/km^{2} (3,146.3/sq mi) in 2021.

According to Statistics Canada, there were 839,311 people residing in the Quebec City census metropolitan area.

In 2016, 20.6% of the resident population in Quebec City was of retirement age (65 and over for males and females) compared with 16.9% in Canada. The median age is 43.3 years of age compared to 41.2 years of age for Canada as a whole. In the five years between 2011 and 2016, the population of Quebec City grew by 3%.

=== Ethnicity ===
In 2021, 9.4% of Quebec City residents reported visible minority status, a relatively low figure for a large Canadian city; the national average was 26.5%. The largest visible minority group were Black Canadians, who formed 4.1% of the population. Quebec City also had a lower percentage of Indigenous Canadians (1.8%) than the national average of 5.0%.

Largest non-European ethnic group in Quebec City CMA by census tract based on the 2021 census

Panethnic groups in Quebec City (2001−2021)
Panethnic group	2021		2016		2011		2006		2001	
Panethnic group	Pop.	%	Pop.	%	Pop.	%	Pop.	%	Pop.	%
European (Note: Statistic includes all persons that did not make up part of a visible minority or an indigenous identity.)	473,770	88.8%	475,720	92.15%	477,715	95.05%	465,115	96.39%	160,940	96.8%
Black	21,955	4.11%	12,430	2.41%	5,760	1.15%	4,550	0.94%	1,335	0.8%
Middle Eastern (Note: Statistic includes total responses of "West Asian" and "Arab" under visible minority section on census.)	10,510	1.97%	6,850	1.33%	4,045	0.8%	2,980	0.62%	370	0.22%
Indigenous	9,395	1.76%	7,290	1.41%	4,635	0.92%	3,140	0.65%	1,055	0.63%
Latin American	8,585	1.61%	6,675	1.29%	5,085	1.01%	2,725	0.56%	1,095	0.66%
Southeast Asian (Note: Statistic includes total responses of "Filipino" and "Southeast Asian" under visible minority section on census.)	3,275	0.61%	2,590	0.5%	1,855	0.37%	1,470	0.3%	820	0.49%
East Asian (Note: Statistic includes total responses of "Chinese", "Korean", and "Japanese" under visible minority section on census.)	2,970	0.56%	2,565	0.5%	2,080	0.41%	1,730	0.36%	420	0.25%
South Asian	1,610	0.3%	1,390	0.27%	855	0.17%	425	0.09%	120	0.07%
Other/Multiracial (Note: Statistic includes total responses of "Visible minority, n.i.e." and "Multiple visible minorities" under visible minority section on census.)	1,465	0.27%	730	0.14%	570	0.11%	405	0.08%	110	0.07%
Total responses	533,540	97.1%	516,250	97.06%	502,595	97.28%	482,545	98.25%	166,255	98.33%
Total population	549,459	100%	531,902	100%	516,622	100%	491,142	100%	169,076	100%
Note: Totals greater than 100% due to multiple origin responses

=== Immigration ===
The 2021 census reported that immigrants (individuals born outside Canada) comprise 45,230 persons or 8.5% of the total population of Quebec City. Of the total immigrant population, the top countries of origin were France (7,360 persons or 16.3%), Colombia (2,865 persons or 6.3%), Morocco (2,715 persons or 6.0%), Ivory Coast (2,500 persons or 5.5%), Cameroon (2,225 persons or 4.9%), Algeria (1,920 persons or 4.2%), Tunisia (1,795 persons or 4.0%), Democratic Republic of the Congo (1,315 persons or 2.9%), Haiti (1,120 persons or 2.5%), and Brazil (1,115 persons or 2.5%).

=== Language ===
The great majority of city residents are native French speakers. The English-speaking community peaked in relative terms during the 1860s, when 40% of Quebec City's residents were Anglophone. Today, native Anglophones make up only about 1.5% of the population of both the city and its metropolitan area. However, the summer tourist season and the Quebec Winter Carnival attract significant numbers of Anglophone (as well as Francophone) visitors, and English can often be heard in areas frequented by tourists.

In 2021, according to Statistics Canada, 90.6% of Quebec City's population spoke French as their sole mother tongue. More than a third of city residents reported being capable of speaking both French and English.

Canada Census Mother Tongue – Quebec City, Quebec
Census Year	Total Responses	French			English			French & English			Other		
Census Year	Total Responses	Count	Trend	Pop. %	Count	Trend	Pop. %	Count	Trend	Pop. %	Count	Trend	Pop. %
2021	542,435	491,515	▲1.6%	90.6%	7,685	▲3.9%	1.4%	4,530	▲73.2%	0.8%	33,255	▲26.1%	6.1%
2016	523,560	483,790	▲1.1%	92.4%	7,395	▲0.0%	1.4%	2,615	▲13.0%	0.5%	26,370	▲33.3%	5.0%
2011	516,622	478,395	▲4.6%	92.6%	7,370	▲4.6%	1.4%	2,315	▲36.9%	0.5%	19,790	▲9.9%	3.8%
2006	491,142	456,225	▲1.8%	92.9%	7,030	▲2.8%	1.4%	1,460	▼38.4%	0.3%	17,825	▲35.3%	3.6%
2001	471,962	447,840	▲0.4%	94.9%	6,830	▼21.6%	1.5%	2,020	▲3.2%	0.4%	11,535	▲14.8%	2.4%
1996	467,455	446,194	n/a	95.5%	8,309	n/a	1.8%	1,955	n/a	0.4%	9,830	n/a	2.1%

=== Religion ===
According to the 2021 census, religious groups in Quebec City included:

- Christianity (349,320 residents, or 65.5%)
- Irreligion (162,900; 30.5%)
- Islam (17,490; 3.3%)
- Buddhism (1,565; 0.3%)
- Hinduism (515; 0.1%)
- Judaism (305; 0.1%)
- Indigenous Spirituality (75; <0.1%)
- Sikhism (20; <0.1%)
- Other (1,355; 0.3%)

== Economy ==
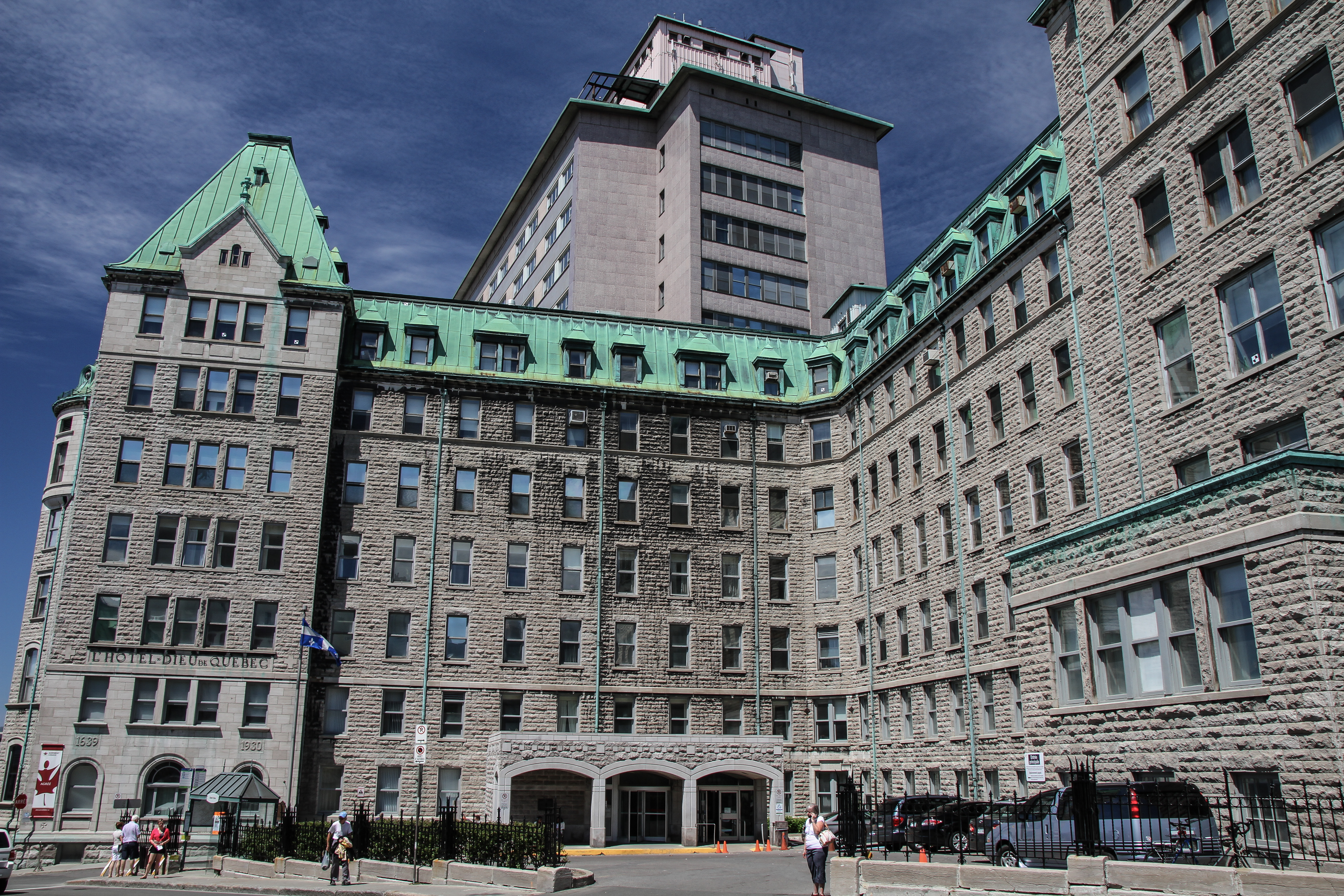
Hôtel-Dieu de Québec is one of three hospitals operated by CHUQ, one of the largest employer in Quebec City.

Most jobs in Quebec City are concentrated in public administration, defence, services, commerce, transport and tourism. As the provincial capital, the city benefits from being a regional administrative and services centre: apropos, the provincial government is the largest employer in the city, employing 27,900 people as of 2007. CHUQ (the local hospital network) is the city's largest institutional employer, with more than 10,000 employees in 2007. The unemployment rate in June 2018 was 3.8%, below the national average (6.0%) and the second-lowest of Canada's 34 largest cities, behind Peterborough (2.7%).

Around 10% of jobs are in manufacturing. Principal products include pulp and paper, processed food, metal/wood items, chemicals, electronics and electrical equipment, and printed materials. The city hosts the headquarters of a variety of prominent companies, including: fashion retailer La Maison Simons, engineering firms BPR and Norda Stelo; Cominar real estate investment trust; Beneva, Industrial Alliance, Promutuel, and Union Canadienne in the insurance sector; Beenox, Gearbox Software, Frima Studio, Sarbakan and Ubisoft in the computer games industry; AeternaZentaris and DiagnoCure in pharmaceuticals; Amalgame, Cossette and Vision 7 in marketing and advertising; Institut National d'Optique (INO), EXFO, OptoSecurity in technology. It is also the domicile of the sole manufactory of the cigarette maker Rothmans, Benson & Hedges.

=== Business districts ===
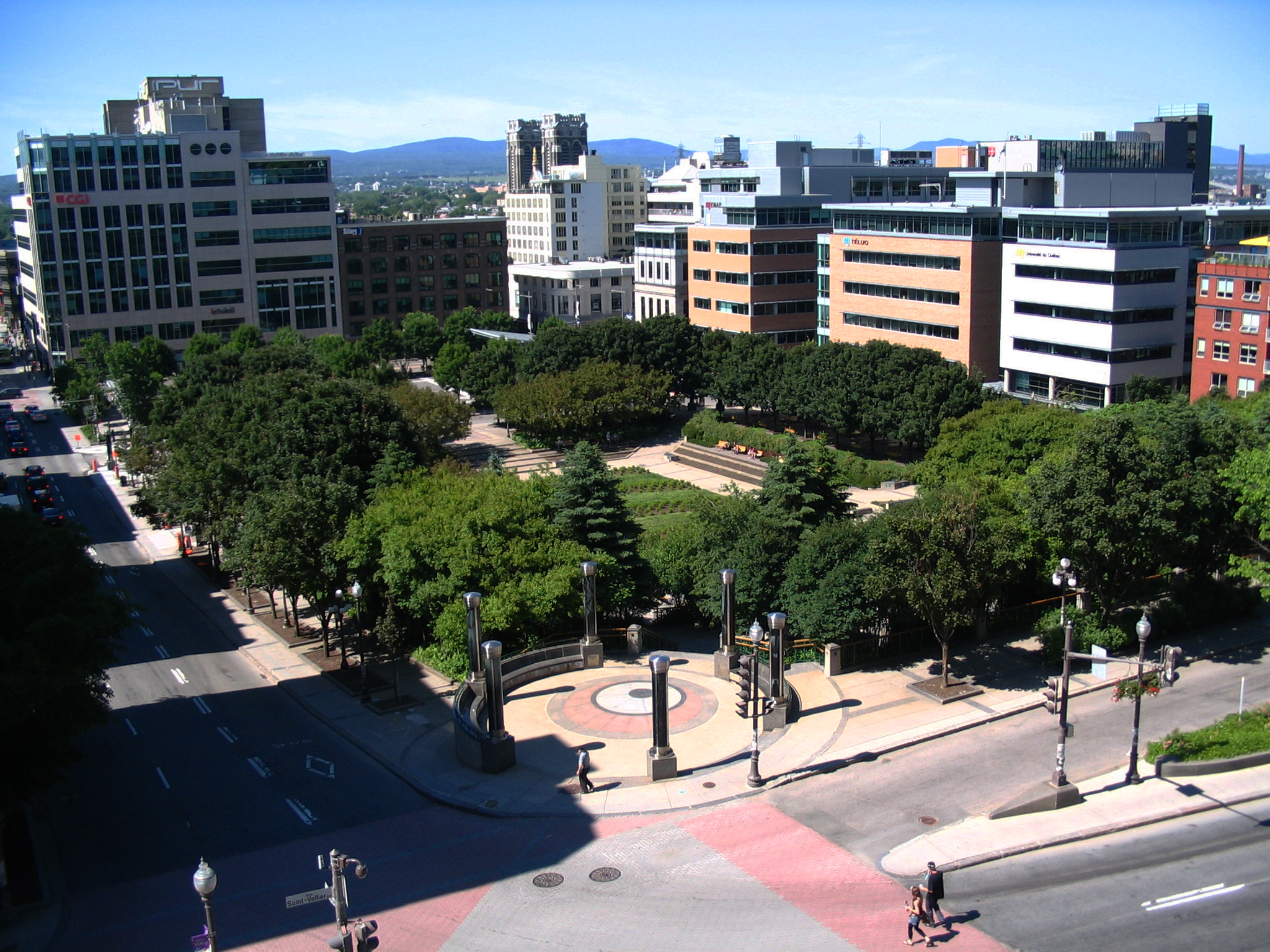
Saint-Roch's garden, lower town

While the traditional central business districts and their large office buildings are found on Parliament Hill (especially for provincial administration) and just below in Saint-Roch (nowadays notable for IT and the video game industry), a newer one has emerged in the Boulevard Laurier area of Sainte-Foy, where a number of accounting and law firms have moved since the 2000s. Other suburban places identified by the city for their potential are the Lebourgneuf area for private offices, as well as Estimauville Street where the Government of Canada already has many civil servants and where several city officials are expected to move in the 2020s.

== Arts and culture ==
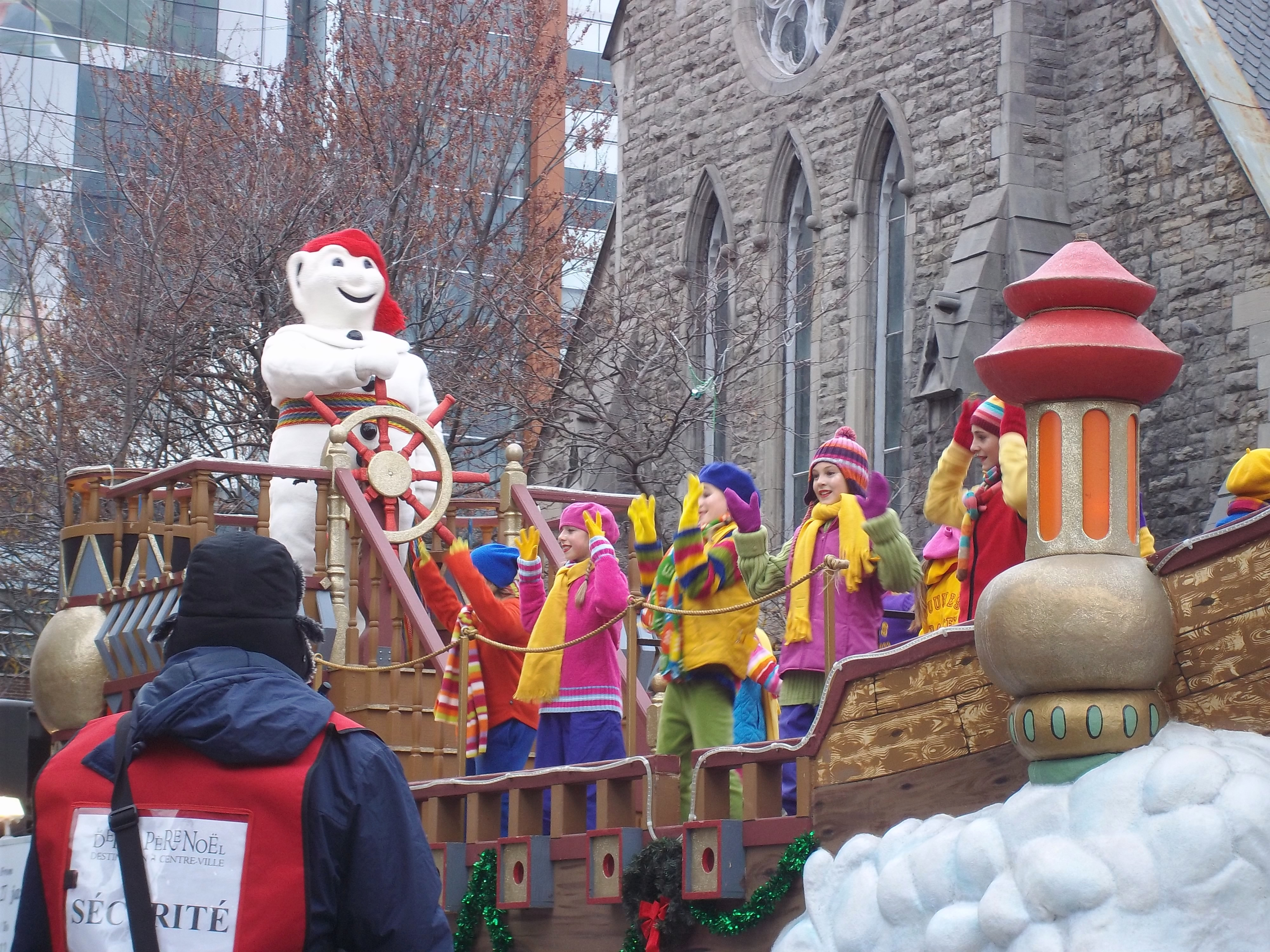
Quebec City's Winter Carnival is the world's largest winter festival.

Quebec City is known for its Winter Carnival, its summer music festival and its Saint-Jean-Baptiste Day celebrations. The Jardin zoologique du Québec, now closed, reopened in 2002 after extensive repairs before ultimately shutting permanently in 2006. It featured 750 specimens of 300 different species of animals. The zoo specialized in winged fauna and garden themes but also featured several species of mammals. While it emphasized Quebec's indigenous fauna, one of its main attractions was the Indo-Australian greenhouse, which initially cost $14 million to build. It featured fauna and flora from regions surrounding the Indian Ocean.

Québec City has a number of historic sites, art galleries and museums, including Citadelle of Quebec, Musée national des beaux-arts du Québec, Ursulines of Quebec, and Musée de la civilisation.

Quebec City Art & Artists: An Illustrated History , a book written by Michèle Grandbois and published by The Art Canada Institute, provides an unprecedented look at the complex colonial history, diverse creativity, and key artists that have come to define the provincial capital. The book traces Quebec City's artistic production through pre-contact Indigenous traditions into four centuries of colonial history. Key artists featured in the book include Claude François, Zacharie Vincent Telari-o-lin, Jules-Ernest Livernois, Jean Paul Lemieux, Diane Landry, and BGL.

Parc Aquarium du Québec, which reopened in 2002 on a site overlooking the Saint Lawrence River, features more than 10,000 specimens of mammals, reptiles, fish and other aquatic fauna of North America and the Arctic. Polar bears and various species of seals of the Arctic sector and the "Large Ocean", a large basin offering visitors a view from underneath, make up part of the aquarium's main attractions.

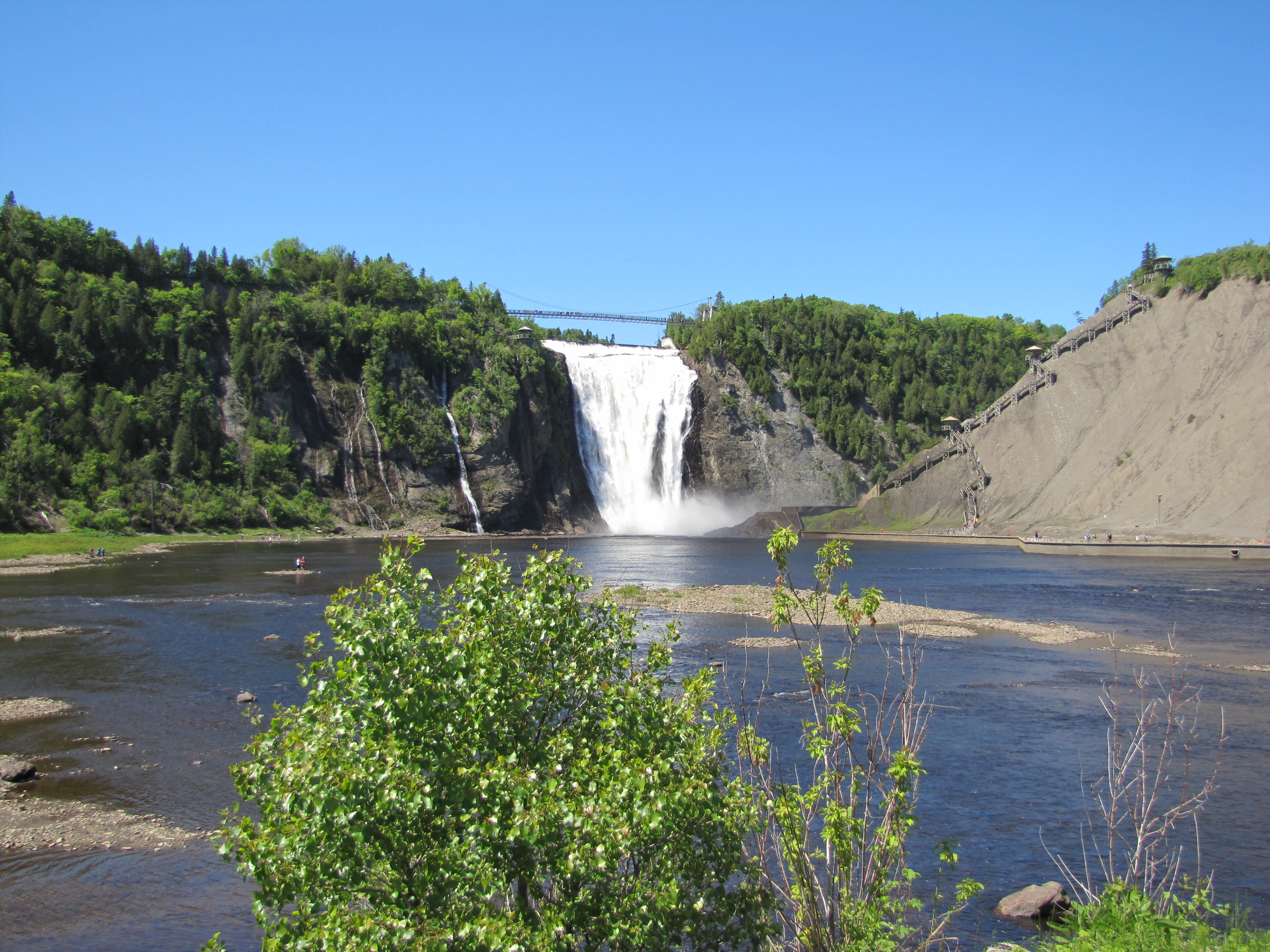
Montmorency Falls is a major waterfall in the city's east end.

Other tourist attractions include Montmorency Falls, and, just outside the city limits, the Basilica of Sainte-Anne-de-Beaupré, the Mont-Sainte-Anne ski resort, and the Ice Hotel.

== Attractions ==
Given the mass of Cap Diamant and the presence of la Citadelle atop it, overlooking the waters of the St. Lawrence River, Charles Dickens described Quebec City as the "Gibraltar of North America".

=== Architecture ===
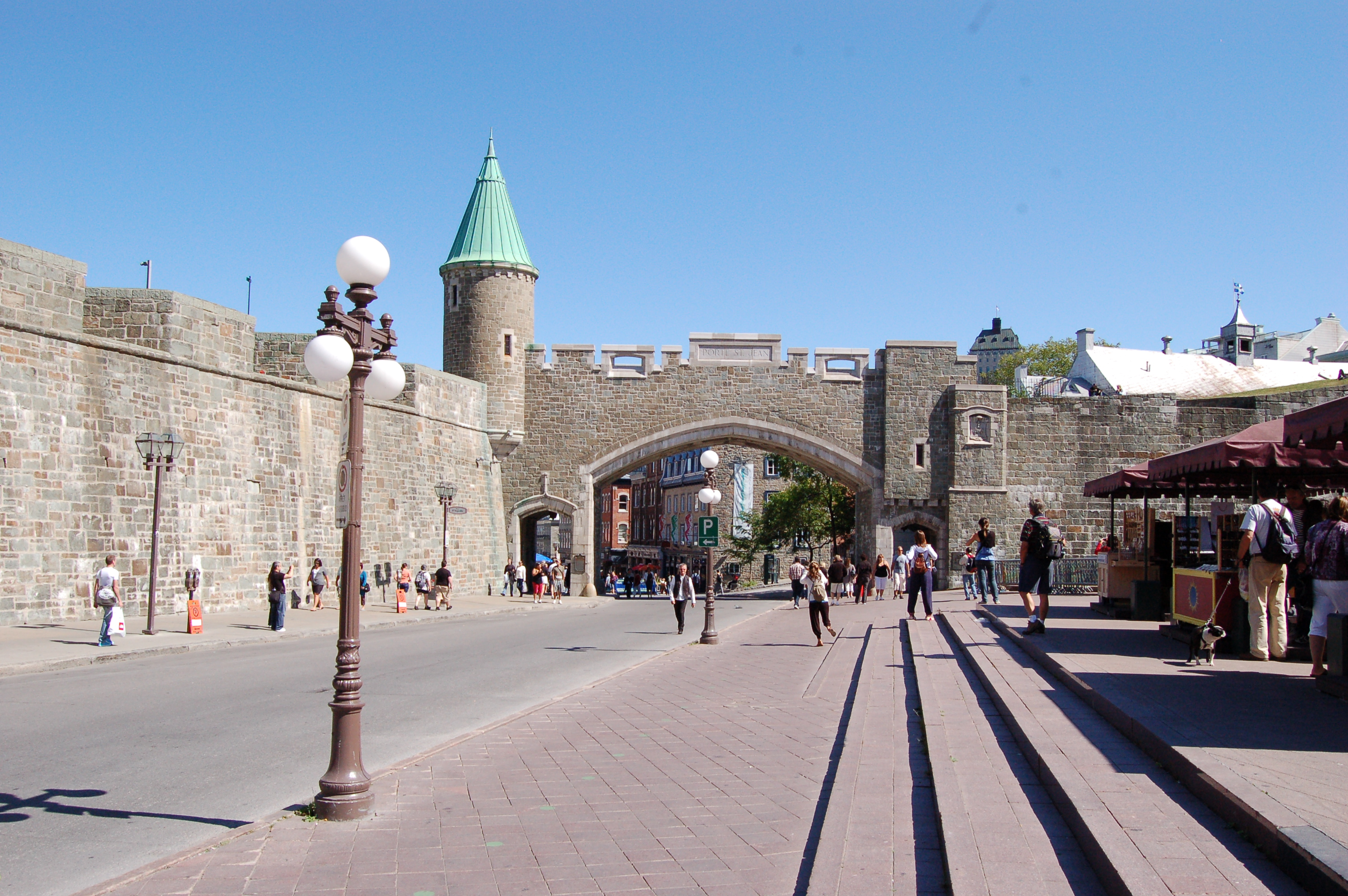
The St. Jean (St. John) Gate

Much of the city's notable traditional architecture is located in Vieux-Québec (Old Quebec), within and below the fortifications. This area has a distinct European feel with its stone buildings and winding streets lined with shops and restaurants. Porte Saint-Louis and Porte Saint-Jean are the main gates through the walls from the modern section of downtown; the Kent Gate was a gift to the province from Queen Victoria and the foundation stone was laid by the Queen's daughter, Princess Louise, Marchioness of Lorne, on 11 June 1879. West of the walls are the Parliament Hill area, and to the south the Plains of Abraham.

The upper and lower town are linked by numerous stairs such as the Escalier « casse-cou » ("breakneck stairway") or the Old Quebec Funicular on the historic Rue du Petit-Champlain, where many small boutiques are found. A small town square nearby, the Place Royale, now surrounded by picturesque stone buildings, is the site of Champlain's founding of the city in 1608. On it is the Notre-Dame-des-Victoires church. The Musée de la Civilisation is located nearby by the river.

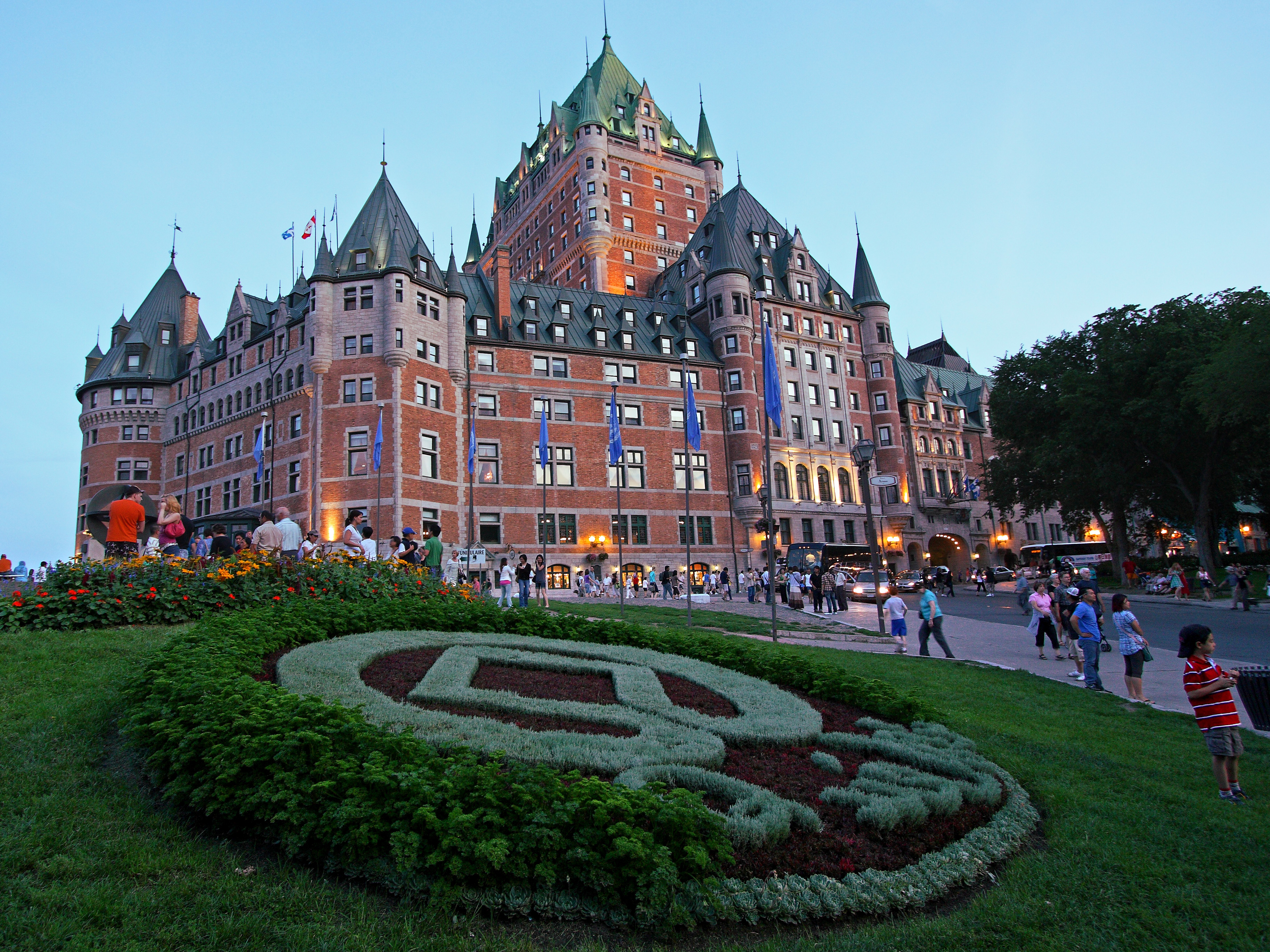
Chateau Frontenac in Quebec City

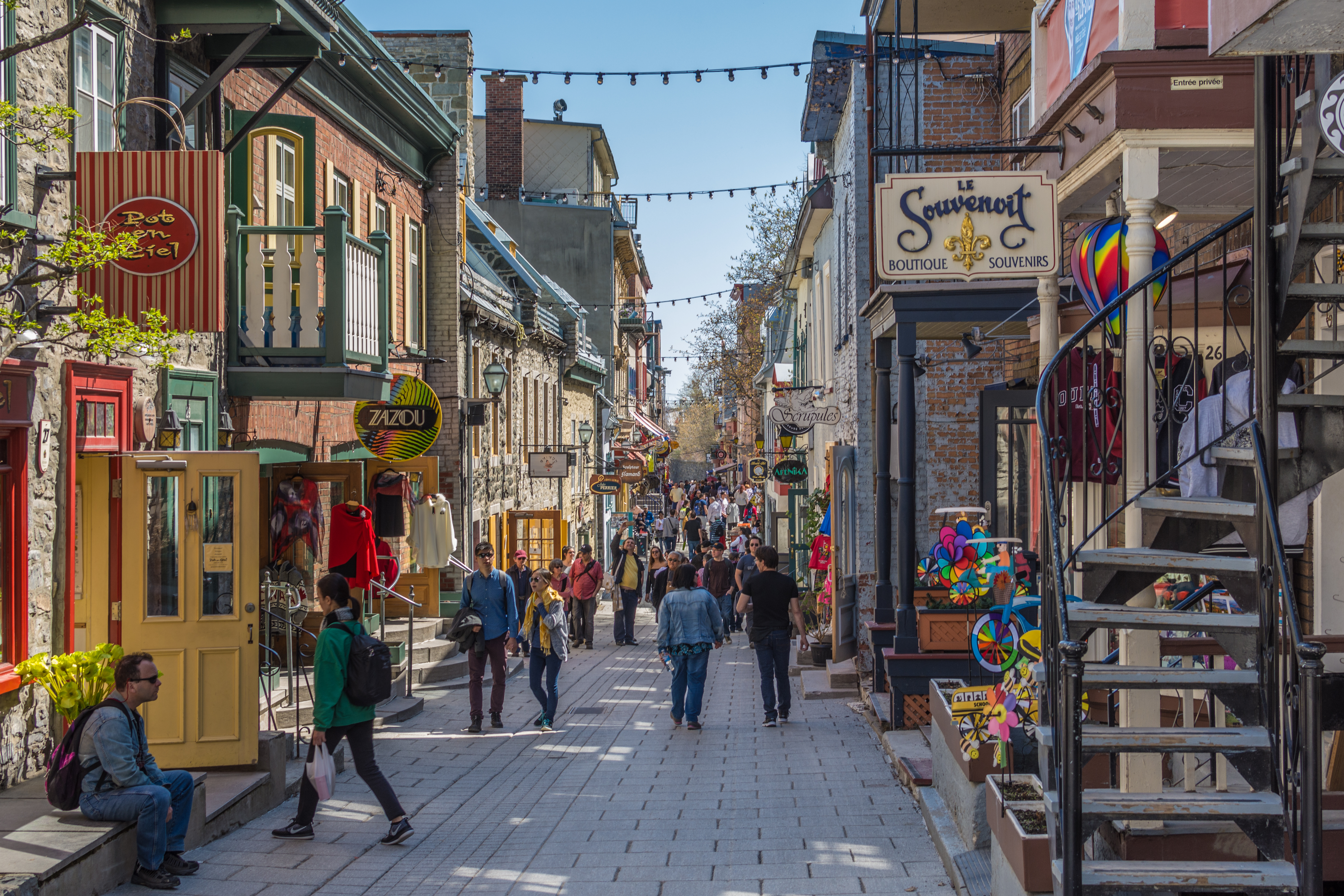
The Petit Champlain, containing the pictured Rue du Petit-Champlain, is claimed to be the oldest commercial district in North America.

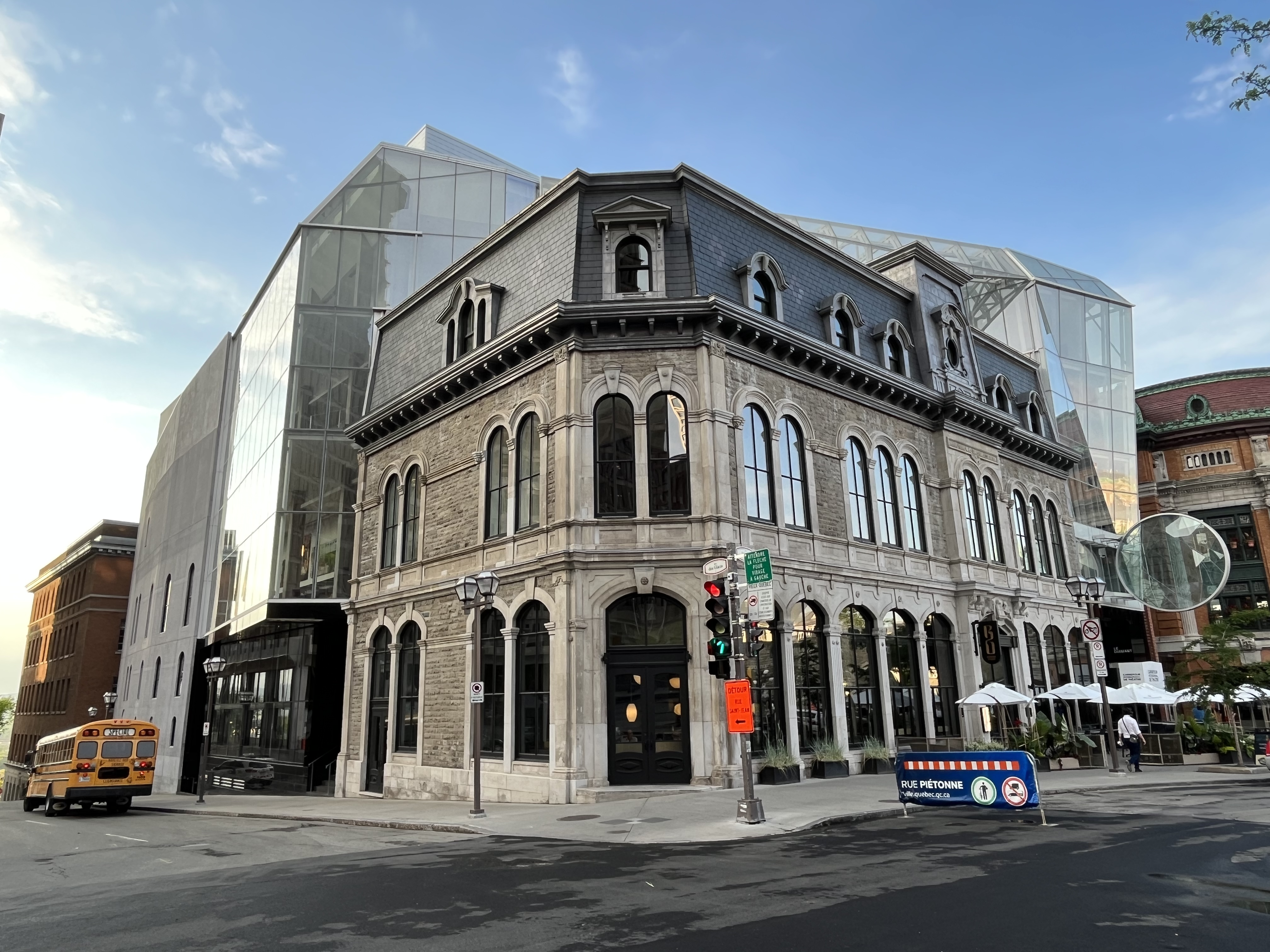
Le Diamant Theatre in Quebec City's Saint-Roch neighbourhood

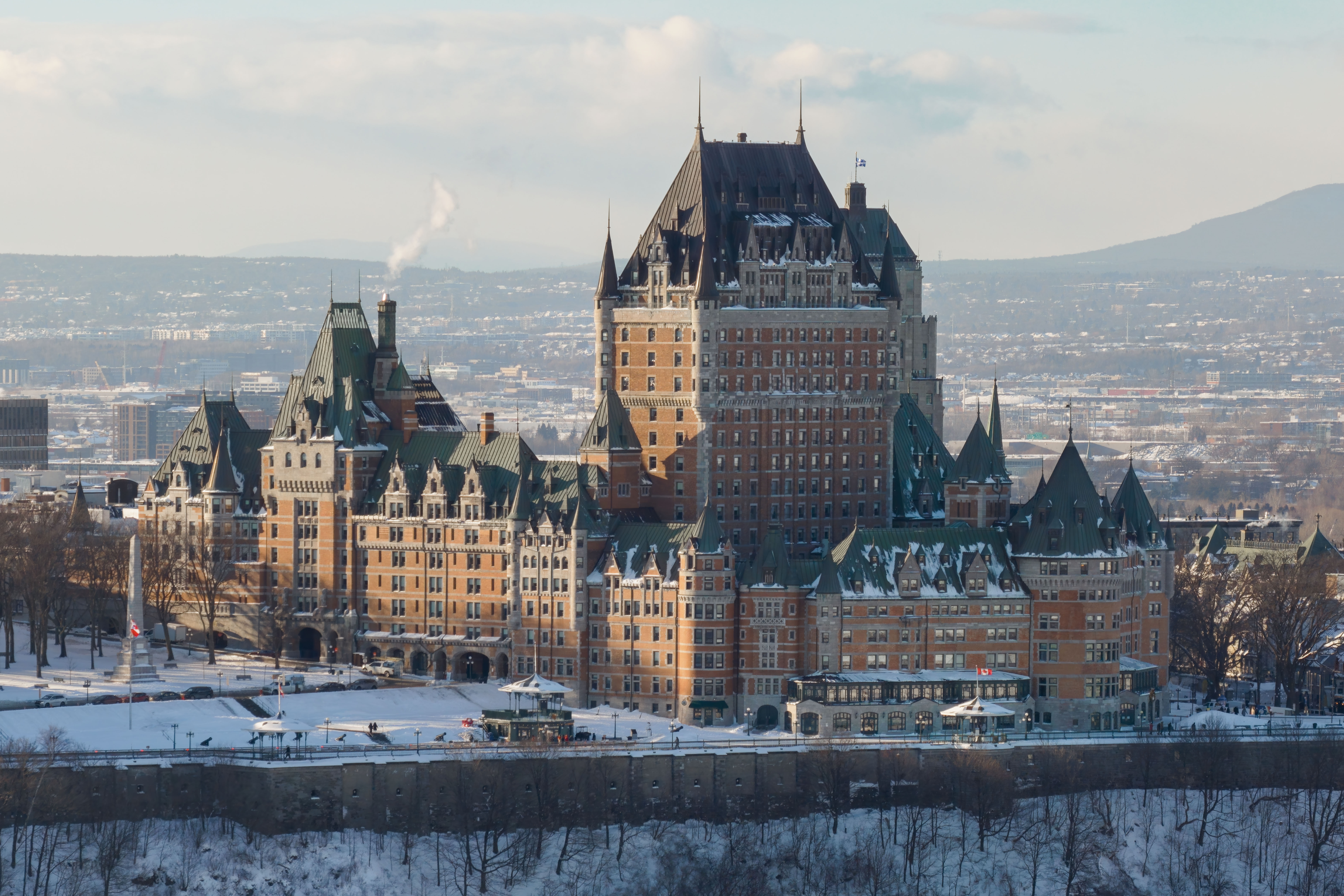
Château Frontenac in 2026

Along with concrete high-rises such as Édifice Marie-Guyart and Le Concorde on parliament hill (see List of tallest buildings in Quebec City), the city's skyline is dominated by the massive Château Frontenac hotel, perched on top of Cap-Diamant. It was designed by architect Bruce Price, as one of a series of "château" style hotels built for the Canadian Pacific Railway company. The railway company sought to encourage luxury tourism and bring wealthy travellers to its trains. Alongside the Château Frontenac is the Terrasse Dufferin, a walkway along the edge of the cliff, offering views of the Saint Lawrence River. The terrace leads toward the nearby Plains of Abraham, site of the battle in which the British took Quebec from France, and the Citadelle of Quebec, a Canadian Forces installation and the federal vice-regal secondary residence. The Parliament Building, the meeting place of the Parliament of Quebec, is also near the Citadelle.

Near the Château Frontenac is Notre-Dame de Québec Cathedral, mother church of the Roman Catholic Archdiocese of Quebec. It is the first church in the New World to be raised to a basilica and is the primatial church of Canada. There are 37 National Historic Sites of Canada in Quebec City and its enclaves.

=== Parks ===
One of the most notable is The Battlefields Park, which is home to 50 historical artillery pieces and the Plains of Abraham. The park offers views of the St. Lawrence River and has multiple historical structures and statues like the Joan of Arc on Horseback and a couple of Martello Towers. Historically this was the site of the Battle of the Plains of Abraham (1759), a decisive British victory in the Seven Years' War which ended French rule in what would become Canada, and the later Battle of Quebec (1775) during the American Revolutionary War, where the British were able to hold onto its last stronghold in the Northern extent of its North American territory.

Other large and centrally located parks are Parc Victoria, Parc Maizerets and Cartier-Brébeuf National Historic Site. Quebec City's largest park is the Parc Chauveau, which is crossed by the suburban section of the city-wide Saint-Charles River and is thus also part of the 31 km (19 mi) long Saint-Charles River's linear park. At Chauveau, activities such as canoeing, fishing and cross-country skiing are offered depending on the season, in addition to an interior soccer stadium. Among others, there is also the beach of Beauport Bay, as well as the Marais du Nord (north-end marsh land).

Quebec is the only large city in Canada along with Halifax lacking a public greenhouse. Nonetheless, outside areas known for their public gardens or landscaping include:

- The linear park named Promenade Samuel-De Champlain that stretches 4.6 km (2.9 mi) alongside the Saint Lawrence River, from Pierre Laporte Bridge to Sillery's east-end. Its bicycle and pedestrian paths then continues to Old Quebec and then along the Saint-Charles River. Just like the beach at Beauport Bay, the construction of the Promenade was funded by provincial and federal governments to celebrate the 400th anniversary of Quebec City in 2008.
- Government House (Quebec), slightly west of the Plains of Abraham in Sillery, and known for its natural landscaping as well as traditional gardens, such as those surrounding the historical Villa Bagatelle. The historical significance of the park also lies in the former presence of the viceregal Government House of Quebec (1845–1966).
- The Domaine de Maizerets, where are found an arboretum and an observation tower, not far from the Saint Lawrence River and Beauport Bay.
- Domaine Cataraqui in Sillery.
- The Roger-Van den Hende Botanical Garden of Université Laval.

== Sports ==
Quebec City has hosted a number of recent sporting events, as well as being shortlisted for the 2002 Winter Olympics city selection. The Special Olympics Canada National Winter Games was held in the city from 26 February to 1 March 2008. The city also hosted the 2005 World Police and Fire Games and the 2022 FINA World Junior Artistic Swimming Championships. Quebec City co-hosted with Halifax, Nova Scotia, the 2008 IIHF World Championship. Regular sporting events held in the city include the Coupe Banque Nationale, a Women's Tennis Association tournament; Crashed Ice, an extreme downhill skating race; Quebec International Pee-Wee Hockey Tournament, a minor hockey tournament; and the Tour de Québec International cycling stage race. In December 2011, Quebec City hosted the ISU Grand Prix of Figure Skating Final at the Pavillon de la Jeunesse at ExpoCité.

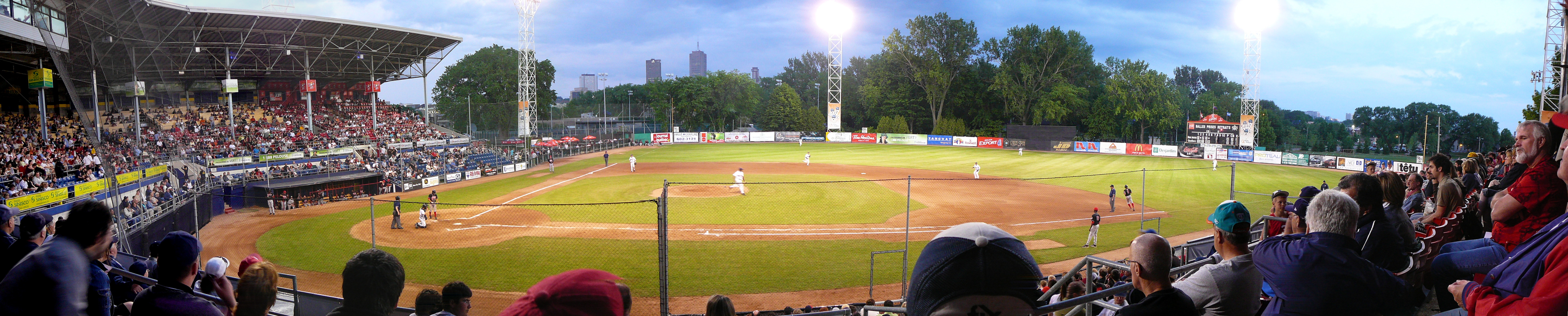
The Québec Capitales play their home games at Stade Canac, a stadium primarily used for baseball.

The city currently has one professional team, the baseball team Capitales de Québec, which plays in the Frontier League in downtown's Stade Canac. The team was established in 1999 and originally played in the Northern League. It has nine league titles, won in 2006, 2009, 2010, 2011, 2012, 2013, 2017, 2022 and 2023. A professional basketball team, the Quebec Kebs, played in National Basketball League of Canada in 2011 but folded before the 2012 season, and a semi-professional soccer team, the Dynamo de Québec, played in the Première ligue de soccer du Québec, until 2019.

The city had a professional ice hockey team, the Quebec Nordiques, which played in the World Hockey Association (WHA) from 1972 to 1979 and the National Hockey League (NHL) from 1979 to 1995, maintaining a strong rivalry with the Montreal Canadiens. Due to a disadvantageous exchange rate with respect to the US dollar, the team moved to Denver, Colorado, in 1995, becoming the Colorado Avalanche. A lower-tier team, the Quebec Rafales, played in the professional International Hockey League from 1996 to 1998.

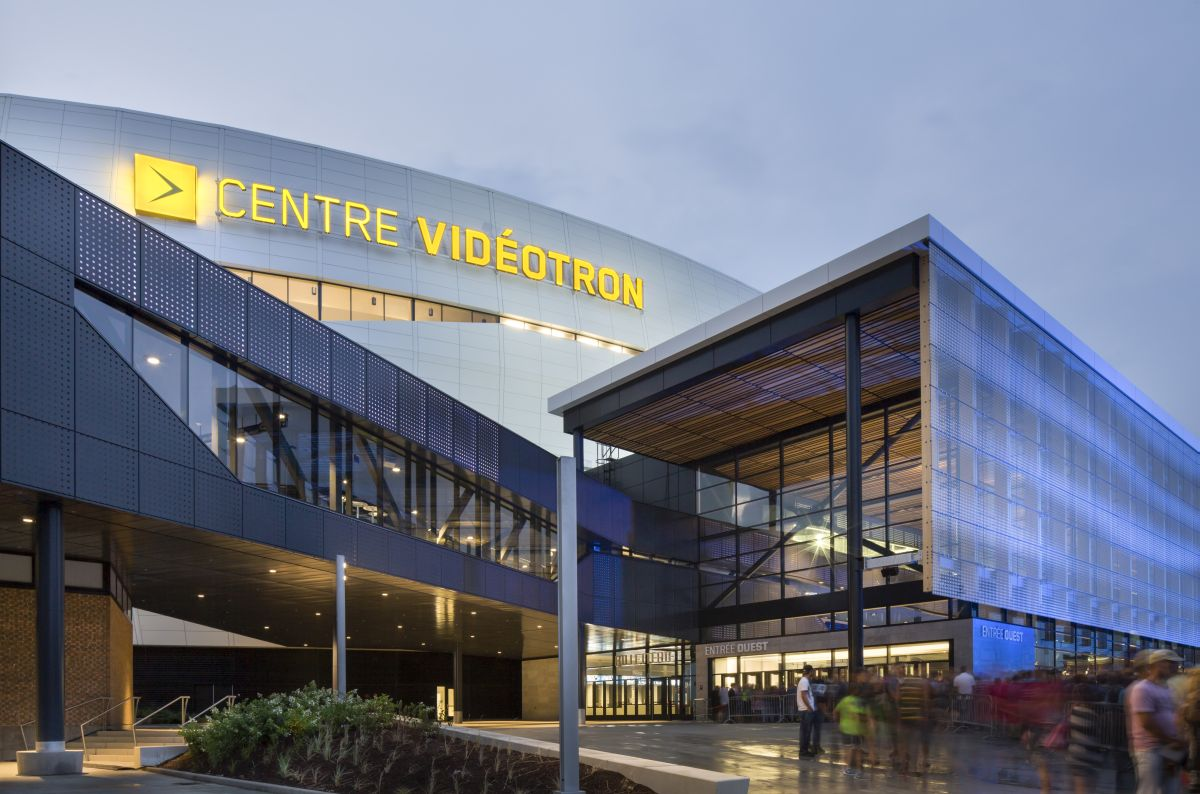
Videotron Centre is an indoor arena and is presently used as the home arena for the major junior hockey Quebec Remparts.

The Videotron Centre was built with the hope of getting an NHL franchise (relocation or expansion) in Quebec City. The project was funded regardless of whether an NHL team arrives. It is also hoped that the arena can help Quebec City win a future Winter Olympics games bid. It has now replaced the Colisée de Québec as the main multifunctional arena in Quebec City.

Other teams include the Quebec Remparts in major junior hockey (QMJHL), Université Laval varsity team Rouge & Or, the Quebec City Monarks, and Quebec City Rebelles of La Ligue de Football de Québec; the Alouettes de Charlesbourg of the Ligue de Baseball Junior Élite du Québec; the women's hockey team Quebec Phoenix of the Canadian Women's Hockey League; and soccer club Quebec Arsenal of the W-League.

Quebec City holds the Coop FIS Cross-Country World Cup. This is a ski event that welcomes the best of that sport.

== Government ==
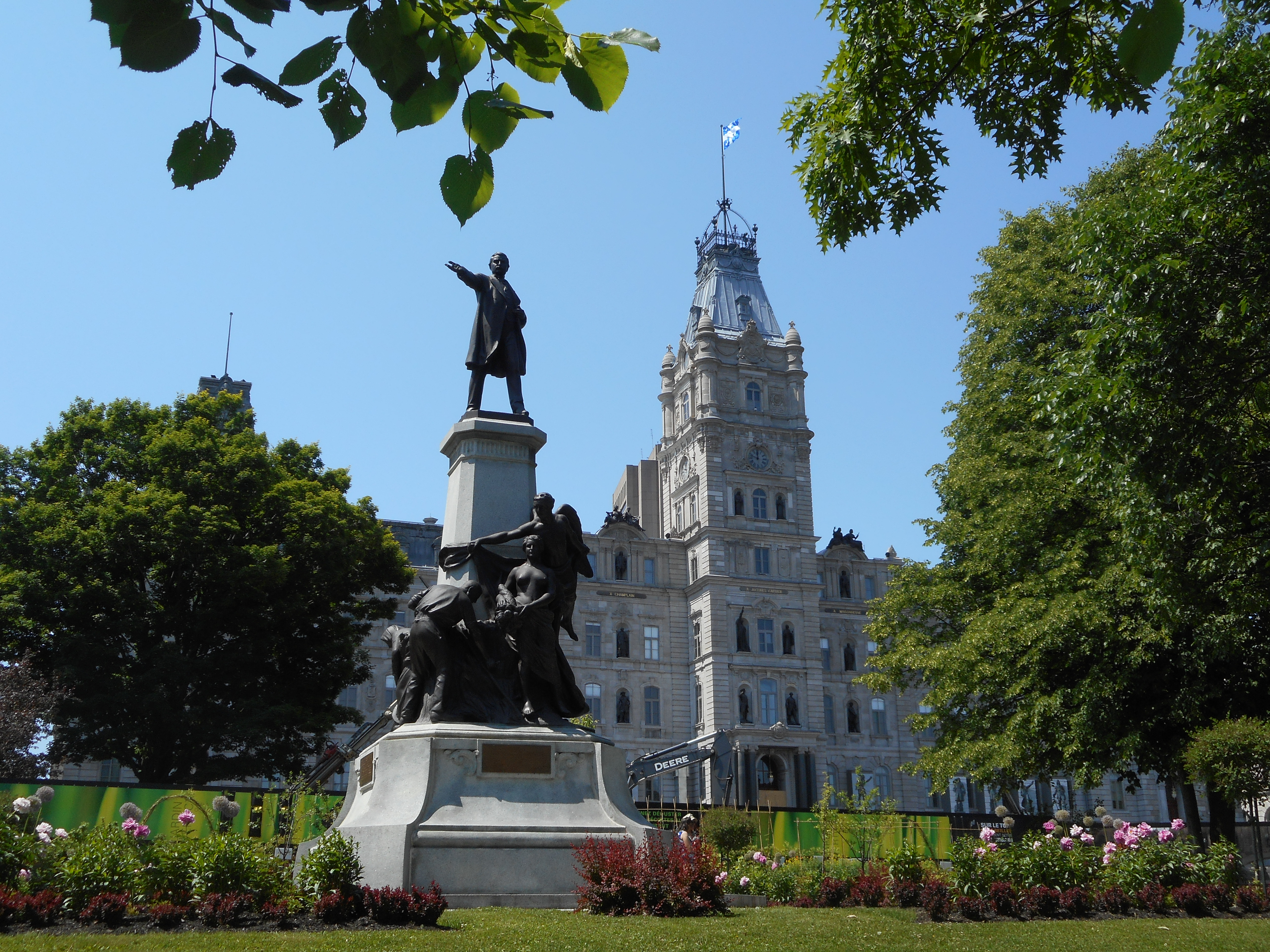
The provincial Parliament Building is located in the city.

Since the 1960s, centre-right parties such as Union Nationale, Crédit social, Conservative Party of Canada (CPC), Action démocratique du Québec and Coalition Avenir Québec (CAQ) have been more popular in the Quebec City region than elsewhere in the province. After the federal election of 2006, six of the ten conservative ridings of the province were found in its metropolitan area (where the CPC garnered 39% of the vote, against 25% at the provincial scale) and in the city proper, the CPC won three of the four seats that existed at that time (the riding of Quebec went to the Bloc). Along with the city's lesser support for Quebec sovereignty, this led political pundits to speculate about a "Quebec City mystery".

Various lines of thought were offered, including the popularity of the talk radio stations CHOI and FM93 expressing fiscally conservative and non-politically correct opinions. Over the years, this genre has been qualified by its detractors as radio poubelle (English: trash radio) and hosts like Jeff Fillion and André Arthur likened to shock jocks. Also, compared to the rest of the province, people of the area may favour harsher criminal sentences, and lower-class households may share political views more in line with those earning more. The reasons for this remain unclear. Another researcher put forward the historical factors that led to Montreal surpassing Quebec as the metropolis of British North America in the early 19th century. According to this theory, its permanent status of "second city" (albeit the capital) engendered feelings of "repressed jealousy".

The "mystery" was relativized following the 2011 federal election. All five ridings within the city were won by the leftist New Democratic Party, in the so-called "orange wave" that temporarily swept the province. Nonetheless, five of the six seats won by the Conservatives in the province were found in the greater Quebec City area. At the 2018 provincial election, the leftist party Québec solidaire managed to win two districts, Taschereau and Jean-Lesage, the most densely populated in town, but the centre-right CAQ, as it swept the province, won six of the nine districts encompassing the city, and 15 of the 18 in the administrative regions of Capitale-Nationale and Chaudière-Appalaches (south shore of the city).

Quebec City federal election results
Year	Liberal		Conservative		Bloc Québécois		New Democratic		Green	
2021	27%	76,734	34%	96,875	27%	75,949	8%	23,129	2%	5,715
2019	28%	82,742	29%	84,656	28%	82,950	9%	25,969	4%	11,789

Quebec City provincial election results
Year	CAQ		Liberal		QC solidaire		Parti Québécois	
2018	41%	118,468	22%	65,462	19%	55,126	12%	34,079
2014	32%	95,770	39%	118,564	7%	21,123	19%	57,481

=== Municipal government ===
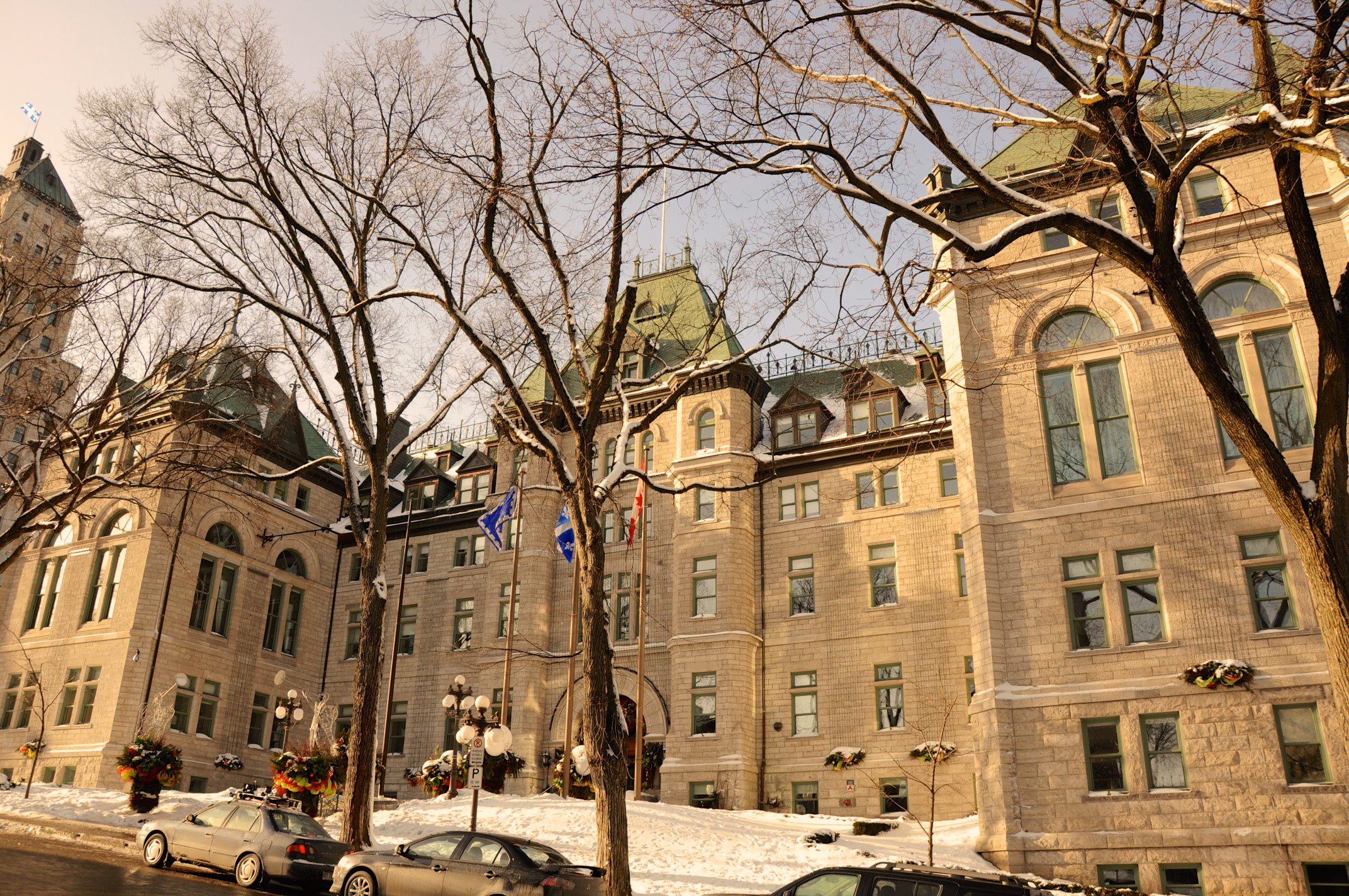
Quebec City Hall serves as the seat for the Quebec City Council.

Quebec City is governed by a mayor–council government, which includes the 21 single-member districts of the legislative Quebec City Council and the separately elected mayor. The councilors are elected by first-past-the-post voting while the mayor is elected by the city at-large. Both usually belong to political parties and are elected at the same time every 4 years. The mayor is an ex officio member of the council but is not its president and has no vote. The current one is Bruno Marchand, elected in 2021.

Each of the city's six boroughs has a council composed of 3 to 5 of the aforementioned councillors, depending on the size of its population. It has jurisdiction with matters such as local road maintenance, leisure, waste collection, and small grants for community projects and others, but cannot tax or borrow money. The boroughs are further divided into 35 neighbourhoods, which also have councils devoted to public consultations, each led by 11 citizens. Their geographical limits may be distinct from those of the city's 21 electoral districts, and councillors also sit at their neighbourhood councils as non-voting ex officio members.

==== Public safety ====
The city is protected by Service de police de la Ville de Québec and Service de protection contre les incendies de Québec (fire dept.) The census metropolitan area (CMA) of Quebec City has one of the lowest crime rates in Canada, with 3,193 per 100,000 persons in 2017, only behind Toronto's CMA (3,115). Exceptionally, no homicide (defined as a criminal death, deliberate or not) was reported in 2007. Still, eight homicides occurred the following year.

On 29 January 2017, a university student shot and killed six people with another 17 injured in a mass shooting at the Quebec Islamic Cultural Centre. Even after accounting for this event, the CMA of Quebec had the second lowest Crime Severity Index in the country in 2017, at 48.5, after that of Barrie (45.3). For the year 2017, the number of reported incidents investigated as hate crimes by the city police increased from 57 to 71, and for those specifically targeting Muslims from 21 to 42. The overall rate of reported hate crimes was thus 7.1 per 100,000 population — higher than the national average (3.9) and in Montreal (4.7) but lower than rates in Hamilton, Ottawa and Thunder Bay.

There were two first-degree murders in 2018, seven in 2017 (six of which were due to the mosque shooting), one in 2016, two in 2015 and three in 2014.

On 1 November 2020, the Quebec City police arrested a man dressed in medieval costume and armed with a Japanese sword. Carl Girouard, the arrestee, reportedly killed 2 people and hospitalized 5 others.

== Transport ==
=== Roads ===
Two bridges (the Quebec Bridge and Pierre Laporte Bridge) and a ferry service connect the city with Lévis and its suburbs along the south shore of the Saint Lawrence River. The Orleans Island Bridge links Quebec City with pastoral Orleans Island.

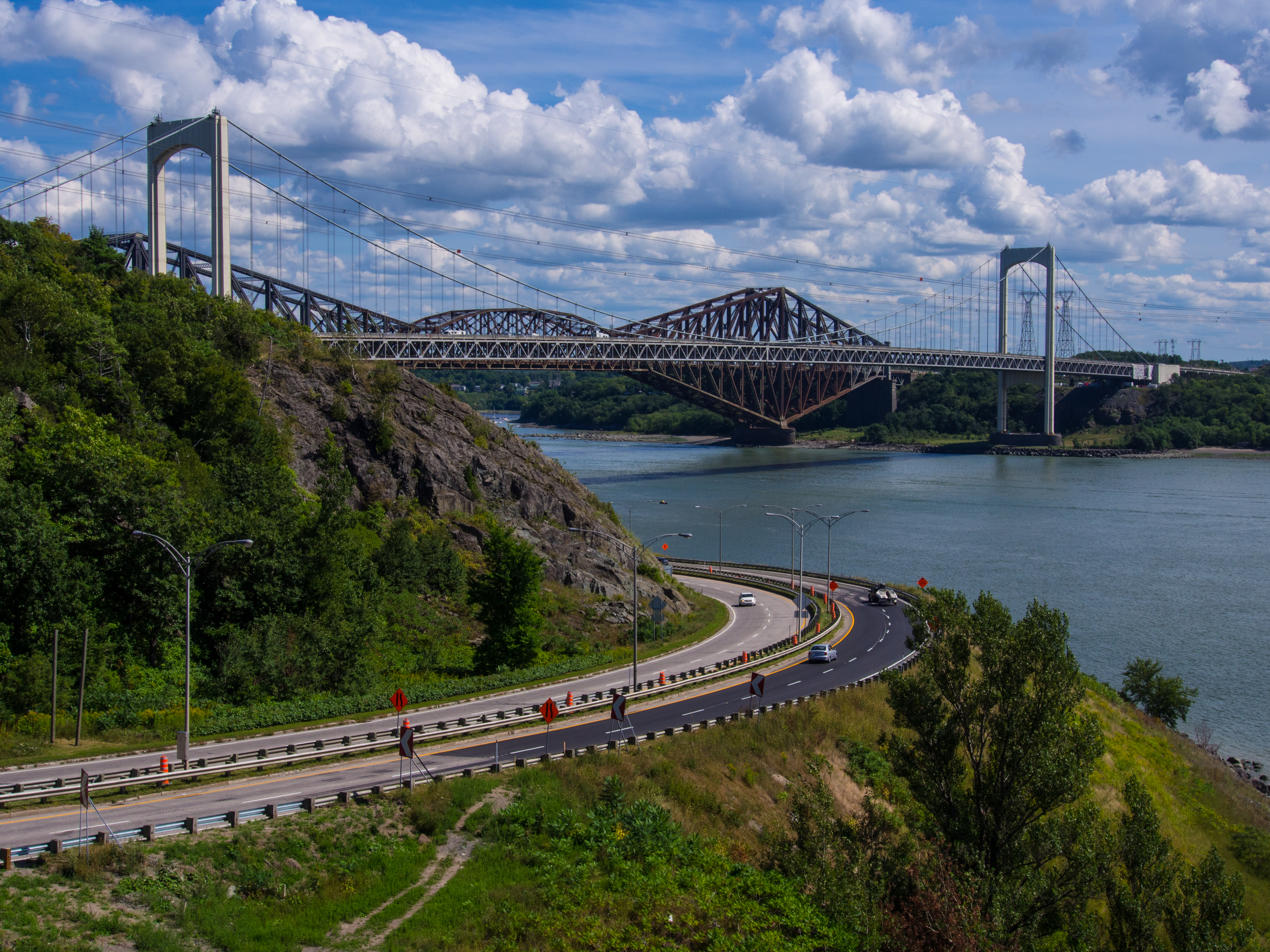
The Pierre-Laporte Quebec Bridges connect the city with neighbouring Lévis.

Quebec City is an important hub in the province's autoroute system, as well as boasting one of the highest "expressway lane kilometres per 1000 persons" in the country (1.10 km), behind Calgary (1.74), Hamilton (1.61) and Edmonton (1.24). Autoroute 40 connects the region with Montreal and Ottawa to the west and Sainte-Anne-de-Beaupré and the Charlevoix region to the east. Autoroute 20 parallels the south shore of the St. Lawrence River, linking Quebec City with Montreal and Toronto to the west and Rivière-du-Loup, Rimouski, and the Maritime Provinces to the east. Autoroute 73 provides a north–south link through the metropolitan area, linking it with Saint-Georges, the Beauce region, and Maine to the south and Saguenay and the Lac-Saint-Jean region to the north.

Within the metropolitan region, Autoroutes 40, 73, and several spur routes link the city centre with its suburbs.

Autoroute 573 (Autoroute Henri-IV) connects the city with CFB Valcartier. Autoroute 740 (Autoroute Robert-Bourassa) serves as a north–south inner belt. Autoroute 440 comprises two separate autoroutes to the west and east of the urban core. Originally meant to be connected by a tunnel under the city centre, the two sections are separated by a 6 km (3.7 mi) gap. There are no current plans to connect them. The western section (Autoroute Charest) connects Autoroutes 40 and 73 with Boulevard Charest (a main east–west avenue) while the eastern section (Autoroute Dufferin-Montmorency) links the city centre with Beauport and Montmorency Falls.

=== Public transport ===
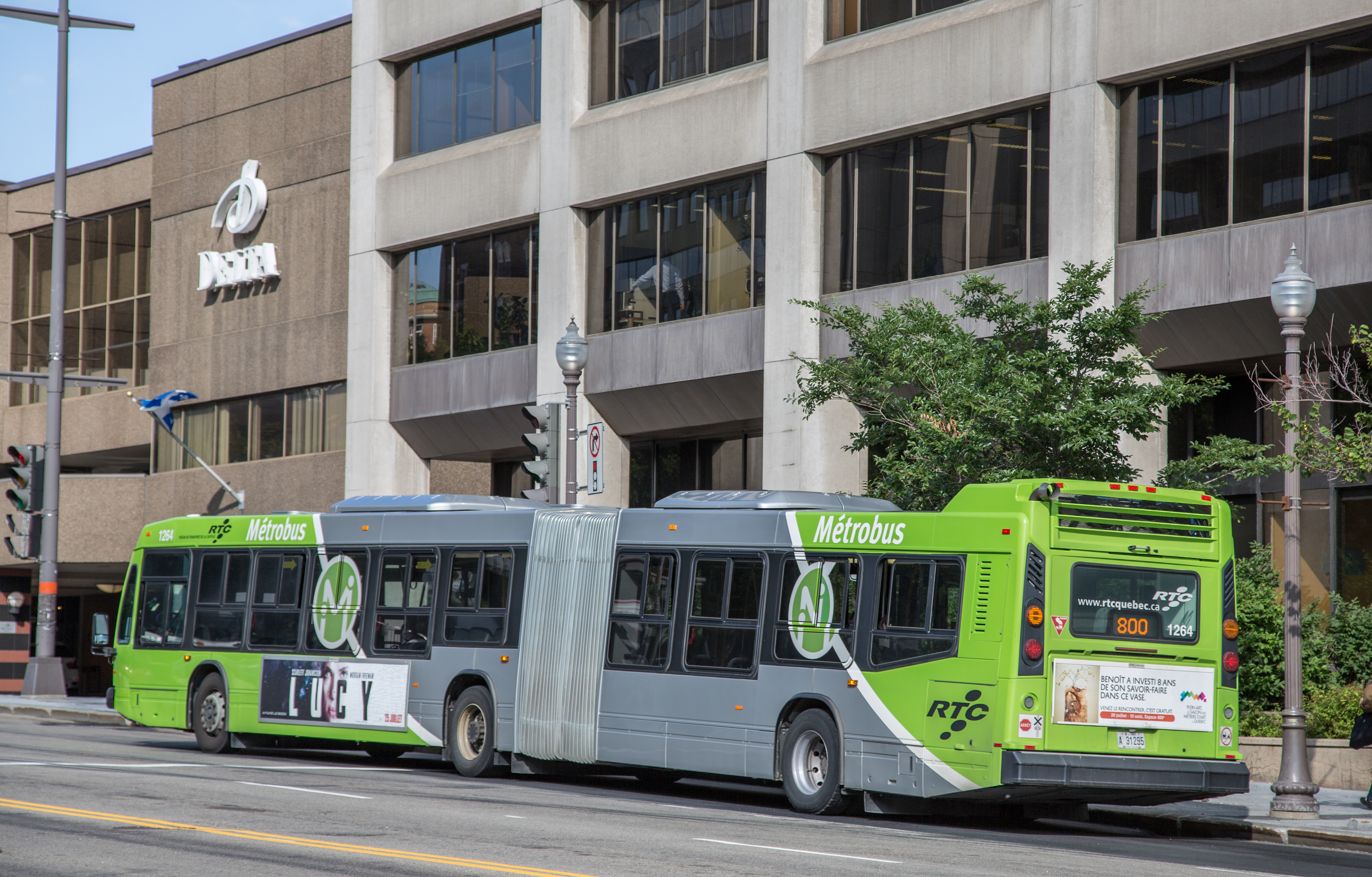
RTC's Métrobus is a six lines, higher frequency and capacity bus service.

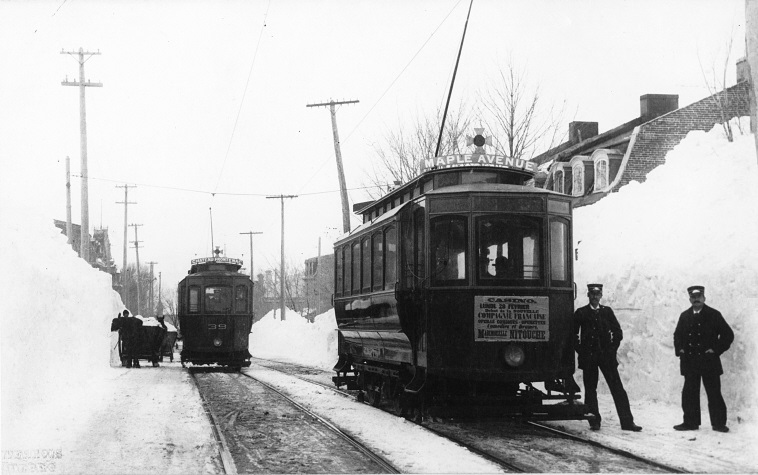
A tram in Quebec City in 1898

The Réseau de transport de la Capitale (RTC) is responsible for public transport in the region. The RTC operates a fleet of buses and has recently implemented articulated buses. The RTC is studying the return of a tramway system to help ease overcrowding on its busiest lines as well as attract new users to public transit. The two billion dollar revitalization project needs approval from higher levels of government since the city does not have the financial resources to fund such an ambitious project on its own. As of 2026, the project named TramCité is under development.

Rail transport is operated by Via Rail at the Gare du Palais ('Palace Station'). The station is the eastern terminus of the railway's main Quebec City-Windsor Corridor. An inter-city bus station, with connections to the provincial long-distance bus network, is adjacent to the train station, and is used by operators such as Orleans Express and Intercar.

=== Air and sea ===
Quebec City is served by Jean Lesage International Airport, located 13 km (8.1 mi) west of the city centre.

The Port of Quebec is a seaport on the St. Lawrence with facilities in the first, fifth and sixth boroughs.

== Education ==
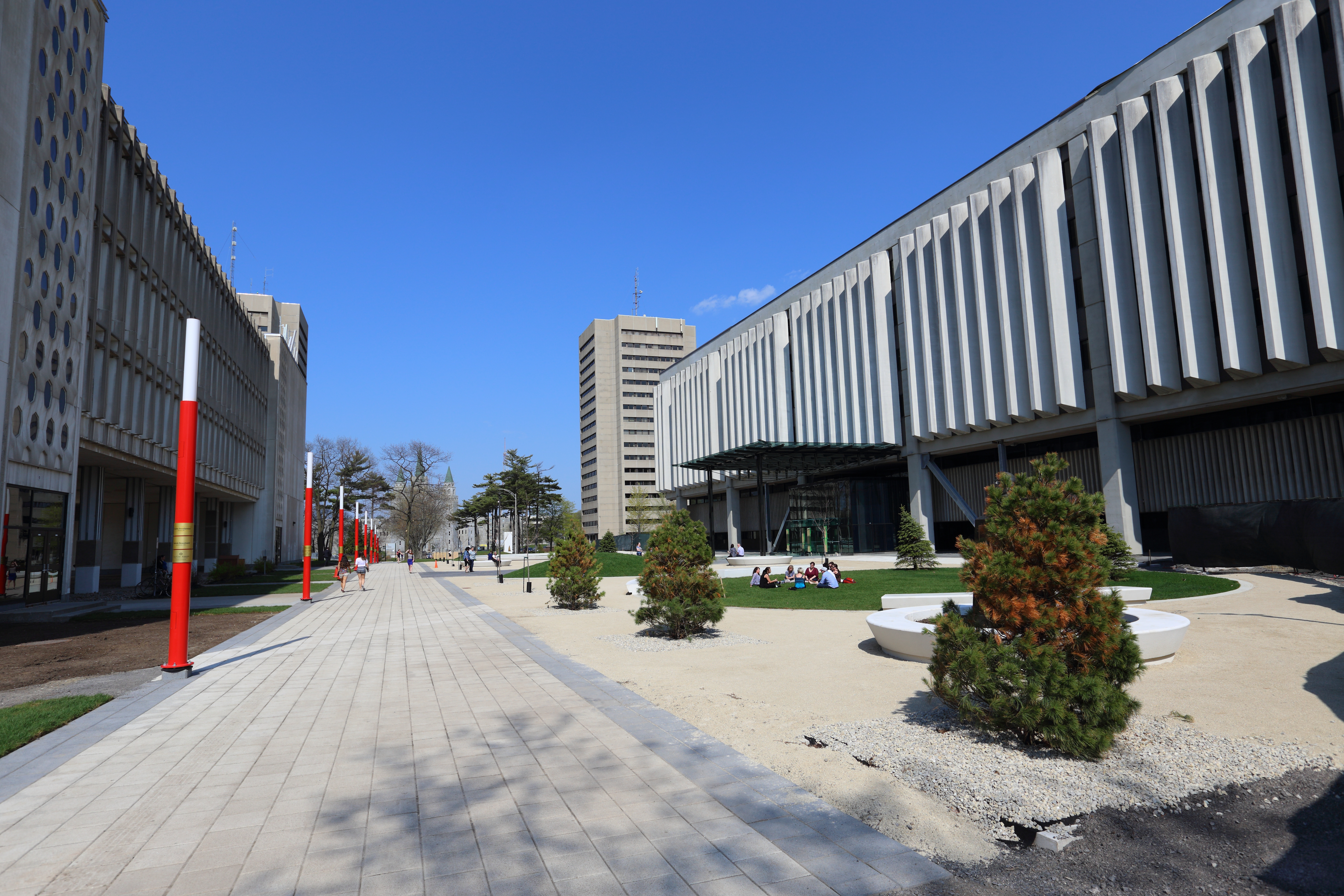
An alley of Université Laval campus

The Université Laval (Laval University) is in the southwestern part of the city, in the borough of Sainte-Foy, except for its school of architecture, which is at the "Vieux-Séminaire" building in Old Quebec.

The Université du Québec system administrative headquarters and some of its specialized schools (École nationale d'administration publique, Institut national de la recherche scientifique and Télé-université) are in the Saint-Roch neighbourhood.

CEGEPs of Quebec city are Collège François-Xavier-Garneau, Cégep Limoilou, Cégep de Sainte-Foy and Champlain College St. Lawrence, as well as private and specialized post-secondary institutions such as Campus Notre-Dame-de-Foy, Collège Mérici, Collège Bart, Collège CDI, Collège O'Sullivan and Collège Multihexa.

Three school boards, including Commission scolaire de la Capitale, operate secular francophone schools, and Central Quebec School Board operates the few existing anglophone ones. Until 1998 Commission des écoles catholiques de Québec operated public Catholic schools of all languages.

Quebec City has the oldest educational institution for women in North America, led by the Ursulines of Quebec, which is now a private elementary school.

== Sister cities ==
Quebec City is twinned with:

- Bordeaux, France
- Calgary, Alberta

It has formal agreements with other cities although they are not active as of 2012. These include Saint Petersburg in Russia, Guanajuato City in Mexico, Huế in Vietnam, Paris in France, Xi'an in China, and Liège and Namur in francophone Belgium.

== See also ==
- List of regional county municipalities and equivalent territories in Quebec
