= Old Quebec =

Old Quebec Le Vieux-Québec (French)
- Interactive map of Old Quebec
- Coordinates: 46.813°N 71.208°W
- Country: Canada
- Province: Quebec
- City: Quebec City
- Borough: La Cité-Limoilou
- Time zone: UTC−5 (Eastern)
  - Summer (DST): UTC−4 (EDT)

UNESCO World Heritage Site
- Official name: Historic District of Old Quebec
- Type: Cultural
- Criteria: iv, vi
- Designated: 1985 (9th session)
- Reference no.: 300
- Region: Europe and North America

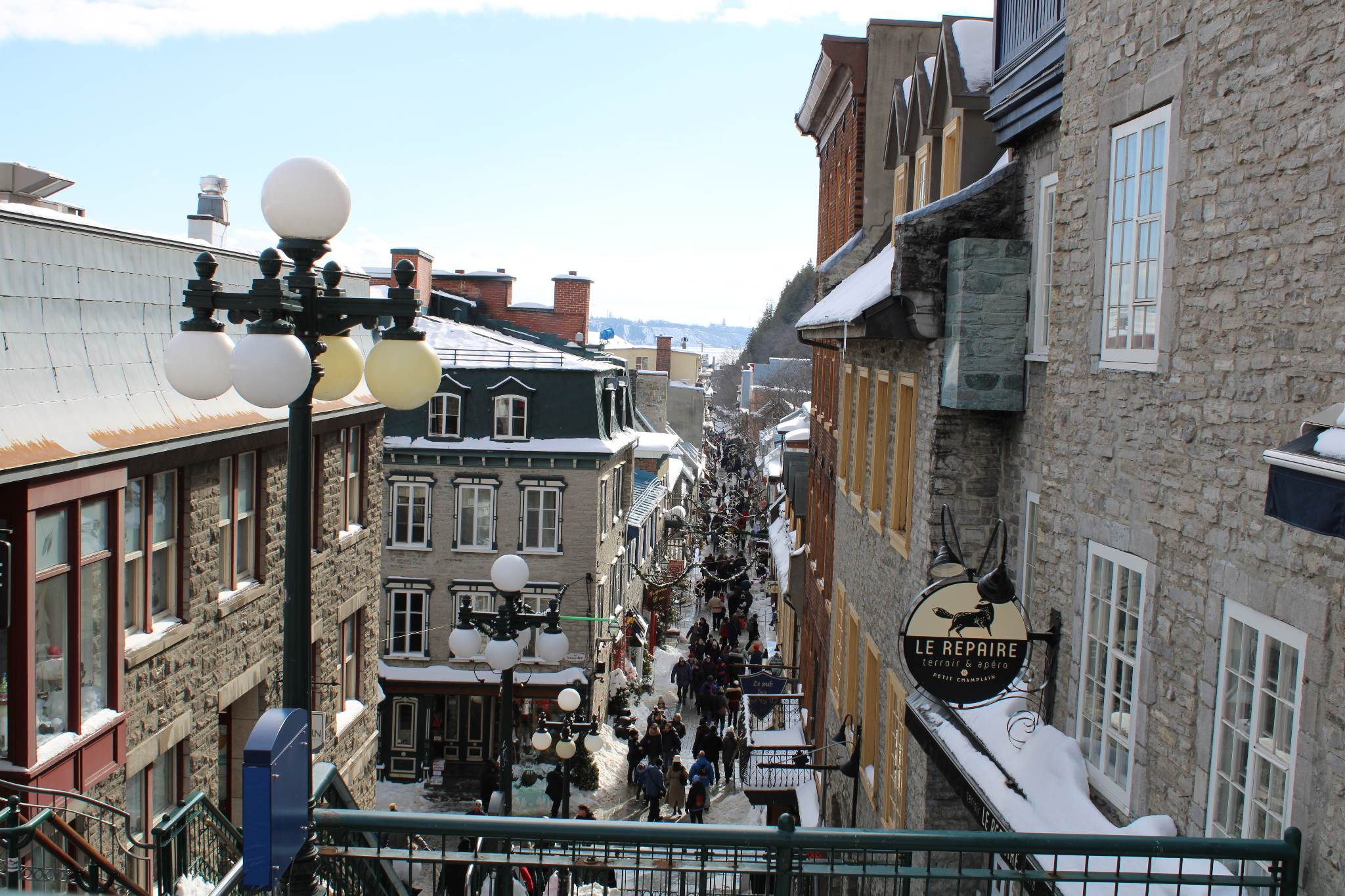
View of the tourism on Rue du Petit-Champlain from l'escalier casse-cou

Old Quebec (French: Vieux-Québec, pronounced [vjø kebɛk]) is a historic neighbourhood of Quebec City, Quebec, Canada. Comprising the Upper Town (French: Haute-Ville) and Lower Town (French: Basse-Ville), the area is a UNESCO World Heritage Site. Administratively, Old Quebec is part of the Vieux-Québec–Cap-Blanc–colline Parlementaire district in the borough of La Cité-Limoilou.

The area is commonly referred to as "the Old City" or "Quebec's Old City" in English. It is sometimes referred to as the Latin Quarter (French: Quartier latin) as well, although this title refers more to area around the Séminaire de Québec, the original site of Laval University.

== Upper Town ==
Samuel de Champlain chose the Upper Town as the site for Fort Saint Louis in 1608. It has remained the city's military and administrative centre because of its strategic position atop the promontory of Cap Diamant. It was occupied mainly by British government officials and Catholic clergy after the British Conquest, while French and English merchants and artisans lived in Lower Town.

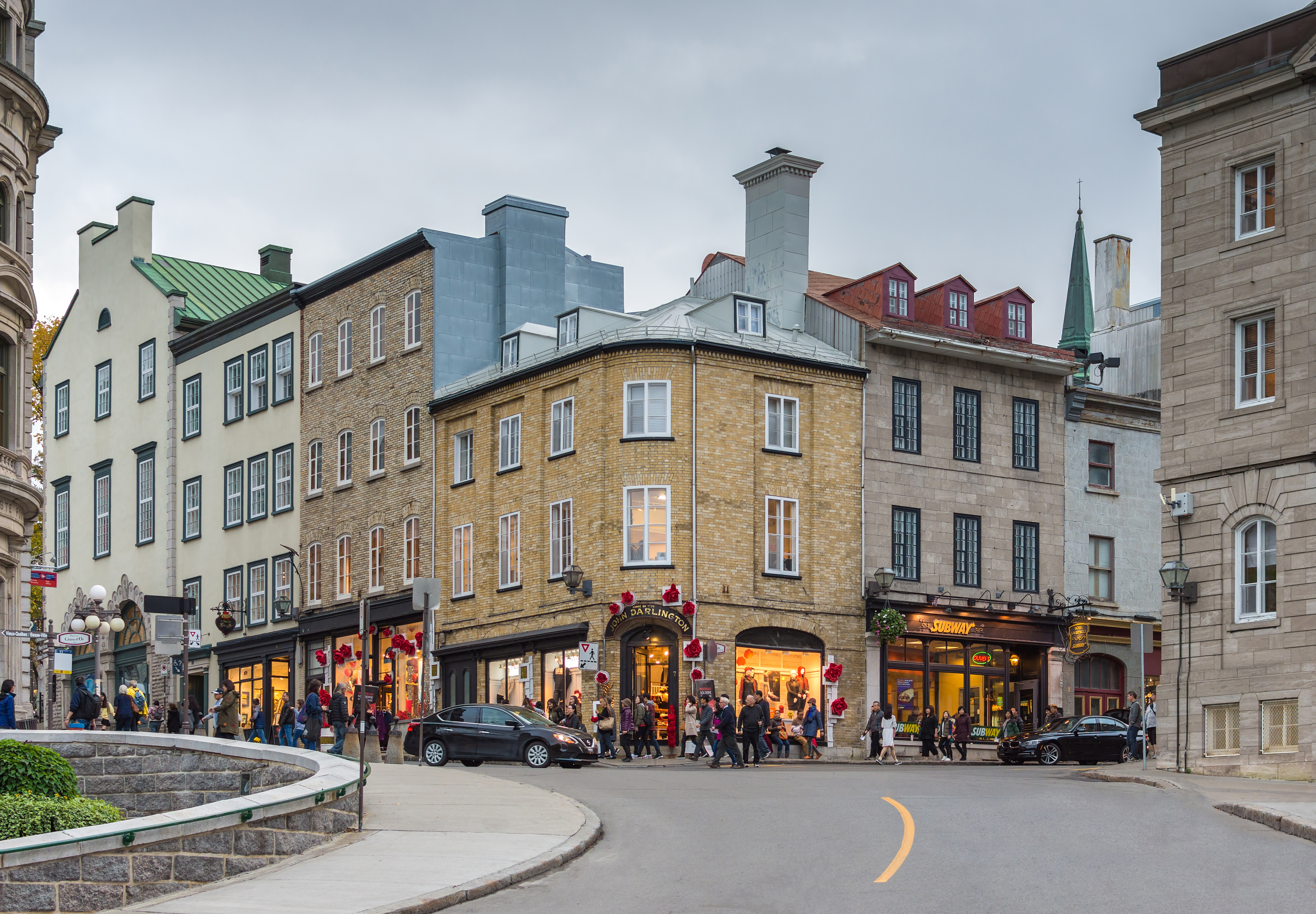
Most of the buildings in Upper Town date to the early 19th century. The John Darlington Building, in view here, dates to the late 18th century

Military use did hamper growth in the Upper Town for many years, and a movement arose in the late 19th century to demolish the fortifications as obsolete and as an obstacle to urban development. It was Lord Dufferin who successfully persuaded officials to preserve and rebuild them.

The area declined and fell into disrepair in the 1950s but new building construction began in the 1970s.

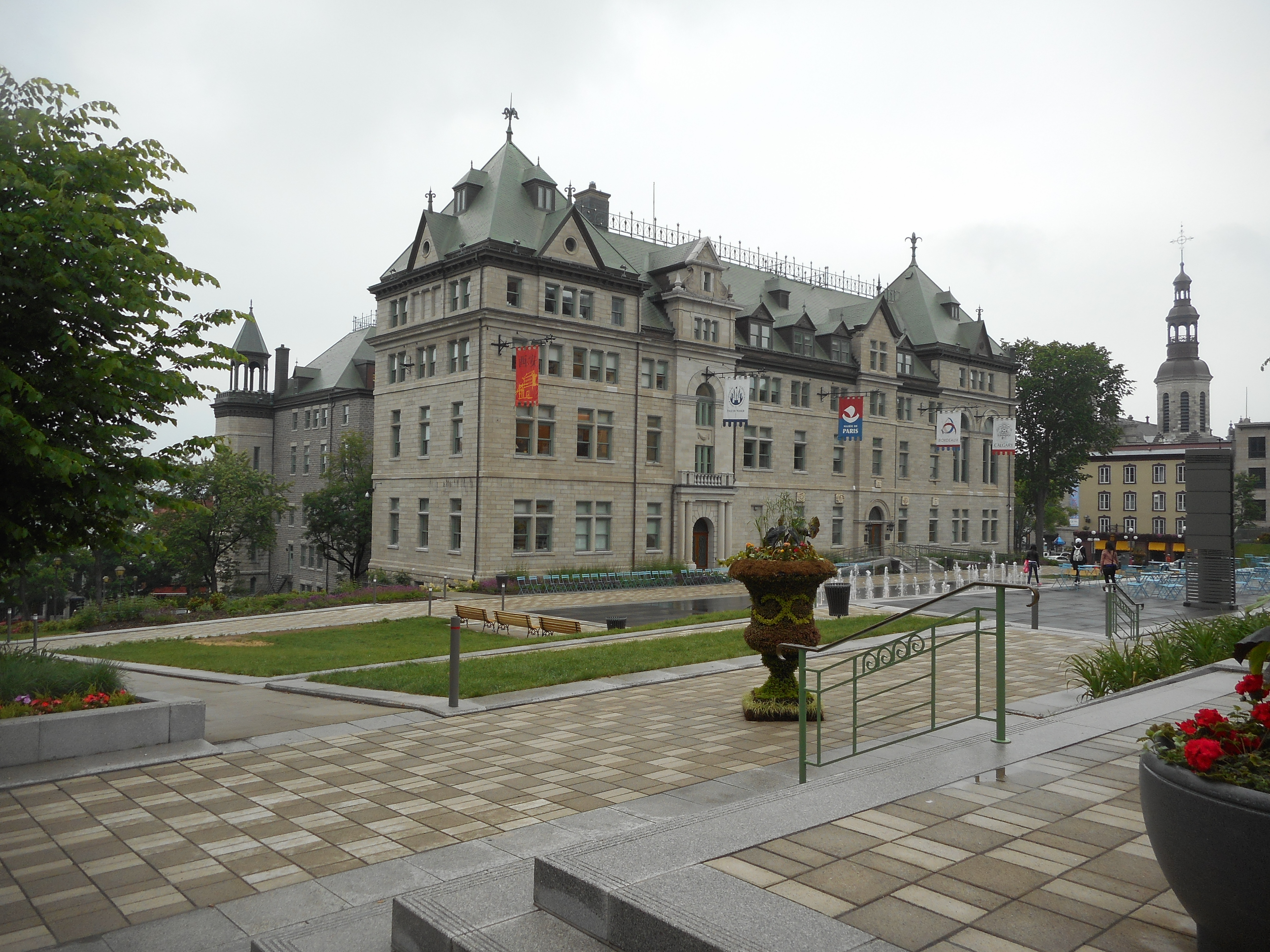
Erected in 1896, Quebec City Hall is situated in Upper Town.

Most of the buildings date to the 19th century, although some date to the 17th and 18th centuries. The area has several commercial streets like Saint Jean, Sainte Anne and De Buade. Some public administration and other institutions in the Upper Town are the Quebec City Hall (Hôtel de Ville), the Séminaire de Québec, the Ursulines Convent, and the Augustinian Monastery and l'Hôtel-Dieu de Québec. There are many hotels, including the Château Frontenac, the Old City being a very popular tourist destination.

Parks in the Upper Town include De l'Esplanade, Artillerie, Des Gouverneurs and Montmorency parks as well as the grounds of l’Hotel-de-Ville.

== Lower Town ==
The Lower Town is a historic district located at the bottom of Cap Diamant. During 1608, Samuel de Champlain built a habitation where its remains can be found with Place Royale as its centre. It was restored with the goal of reconstructing the French flair from its origins. Construction of the Church of Notre-Dame-des-Victoires started during 1687 at this location and was completed during 1723. The Musée de la civilisation, the Musée naval de Québec, the caserne Dalhousie and the Théâtre Petit Champlain are among some of the museums, performance halls, theatres and exhibition venues in Lower Town.

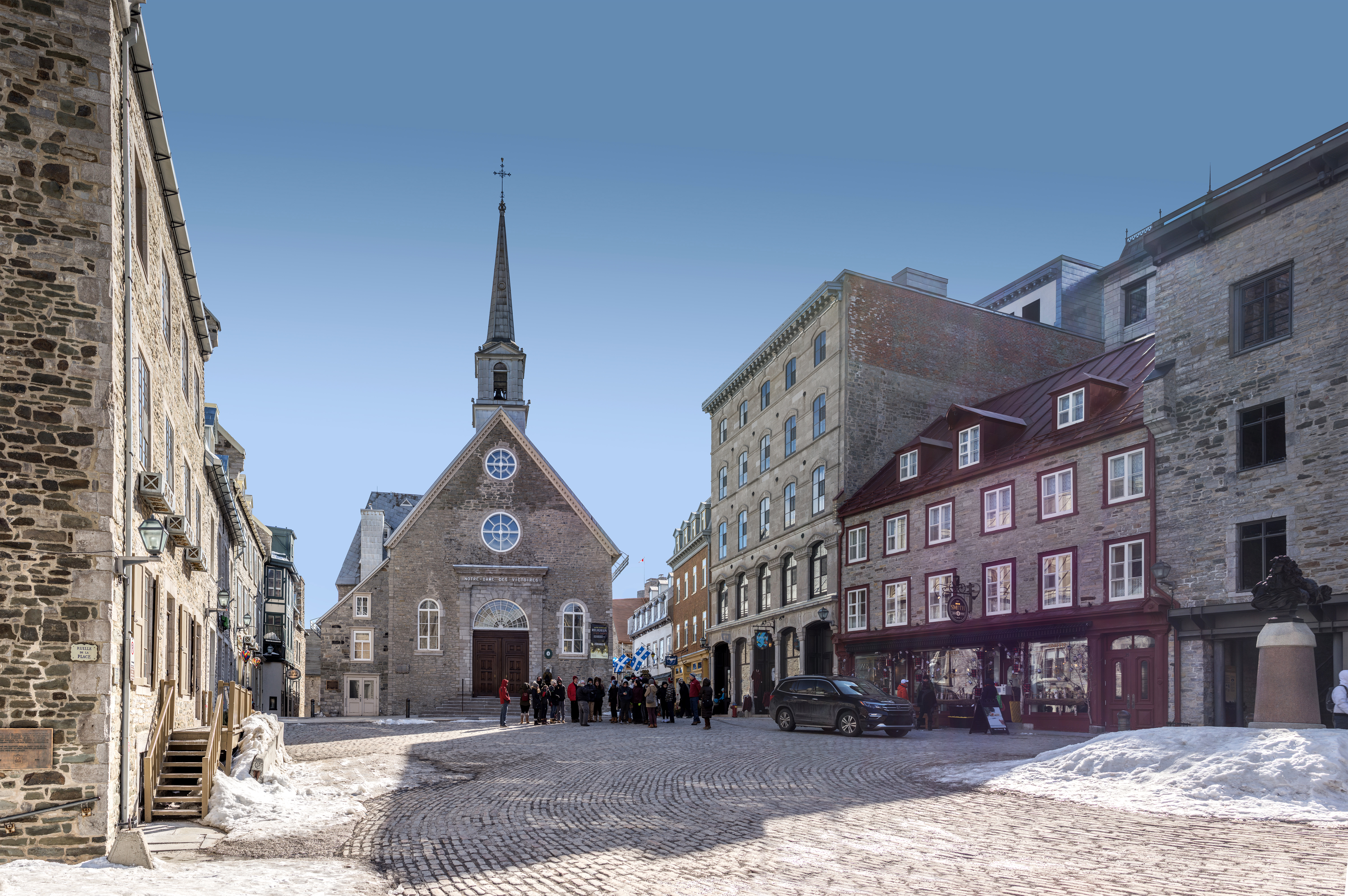
Erected in 1687, the Notre-Dame-des-Victoires is one of many buildings in Lower Town dating back to the 17th and 18th century.

Places such as the Louise Basin, Brown Basin, La Pointe-à-Carcy, the Gare du Palais and the Marche du Vieux-Port can be seen from the Port of Quebec.

Other places of interest include:

- Place de Paris,
- Parc Ulric-Joseph-Tessier,
- Saint-Pierre Street,
- Saint-Paul Street,
- Sault-au-Matelot Street and
- Saint-Vallier Est Street, previously called Saint-Charles Street, the first paved road in Quebec.

A funicular (Old Quebec Funicular) allows for easy transportation up Cap Diamant connecting to Upper Town from the narrow Petit-Champlain road at the foot of the Cape to the top with a marvelous view of the city. Côte de la Montagne is another option for hikers.

== The Historic District of Old Quebec ==
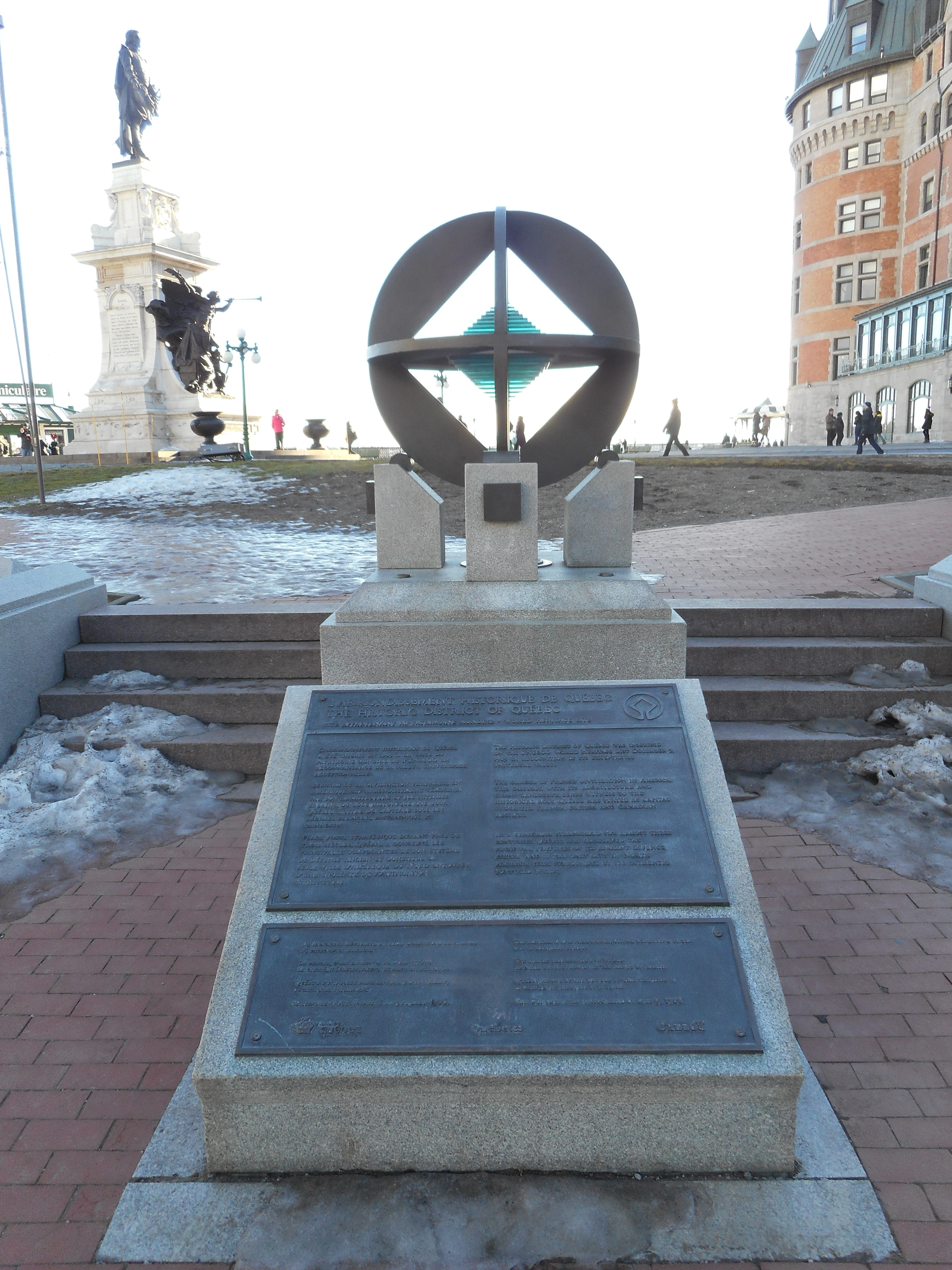
A UNESCO World Heritage Site monument in Old Quebec. The organization designated the area a World Heritage site in 1985.

The Old Quebec heritage site is located in Quebec City although it is administratively recognized as a part of the borough La Cité-Limoilou. It has gained recognition as a part of Quebec's cultural heritage and is also among UNESCO’s World Heritage Sites.

=== Background ===
During 1956, the Historic Sites and Monuments Board of Canada was given the authority to acquire or expropriate any "site, building or other place of national historic interest or significance".

The historic district was established following public debates from 1945 to 1965, concerning the preservation of Old Quebec and the restoration of Place Royale. The historic district of Old Quebec is a UNESCO World Heritage List since 1985.

The district was established by the National Assembly of Quebec on July 10, 1963 after an amendment to the Historic Sites and Monuments Act. The act made the area in the historic area of the city a "Declared Historic District" (French: Arrondissement historique décrété) by the province of Quebec, and was expanded the next year to an area of 135 hectares (330 acres). It includes 1,400 buildings within the neighbourhood of La Cité, including the promontory of Cap Diamant and a strip of land below the cliffs, between the Saint-Charles River and the Saint Lawrence River. The protected perimeter of the area was delimited in two stages. The initial layout included the fortified area as well as its periphery. The second and final layout added other surrounding areas to the plan on May 7, 1964. The whole district covers a total area of 1.42 km.

On December 3, 1985, UNESCO declared the Historic District of Old Quebec a World Heritage Site.

== Transportation ==
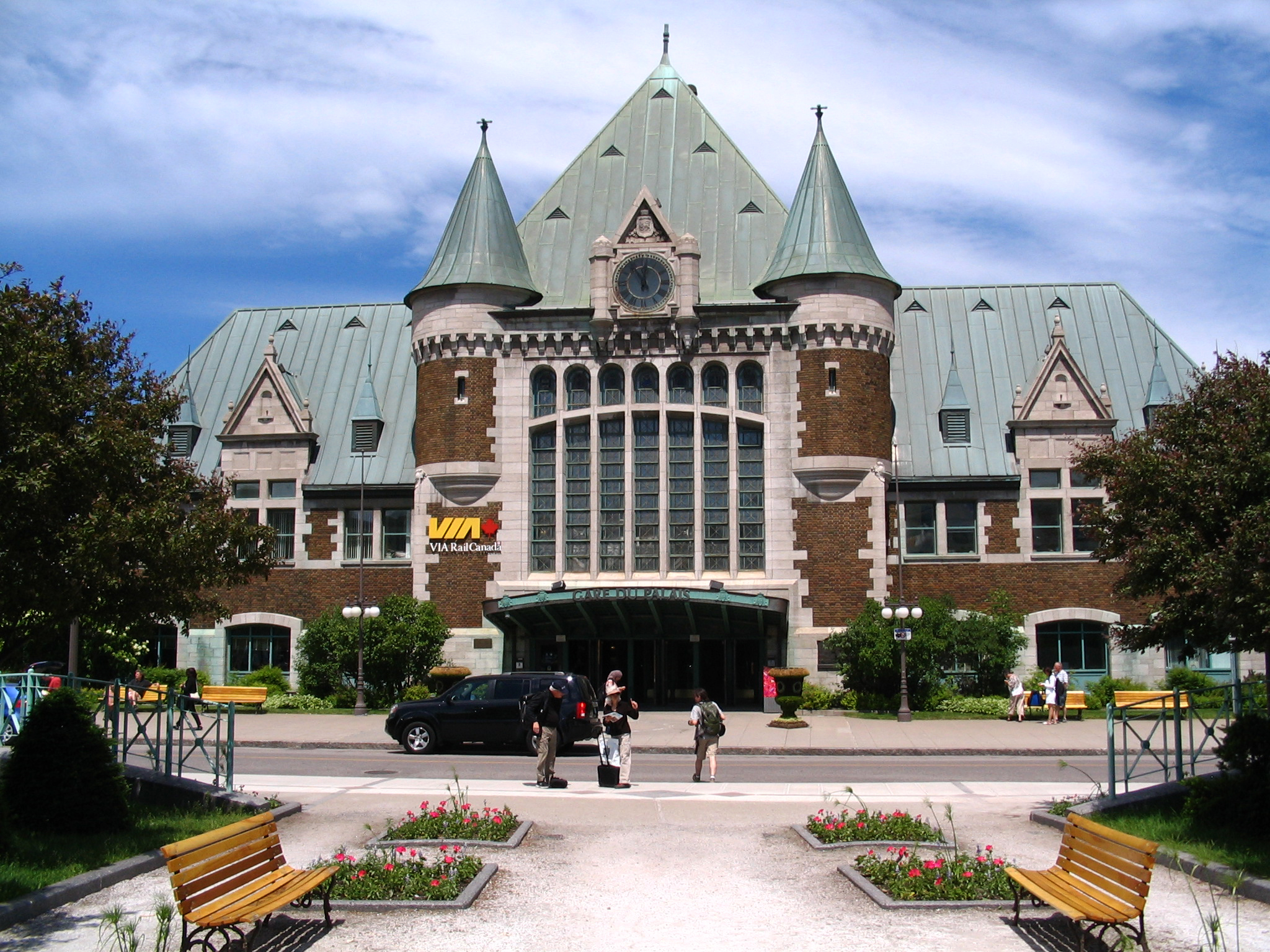
Gare du Palais is an intermodal transportation hub situated in Old Quebec. It provides access to Via Rail trains, and Orléans Express coach service.

=== Rail ===
Old Quebec is serviced by Gare du Palais train and bus station. Opened in 1915 by the Canadian Pacific Railway, the châteauesque station is similar in design to the Château Frontenac. Via Rail operates regular services to Montreal via Drummondville. The station is also serviced by the private coach company Orléans Express.

=== Air ===
Old Quebec is 16 km east of Quebec's Jean Lesage International Airport.
