= Old Quebec Funicular =

Canadian railway

Coordinates: 46°48′45″N 71°12′14″W

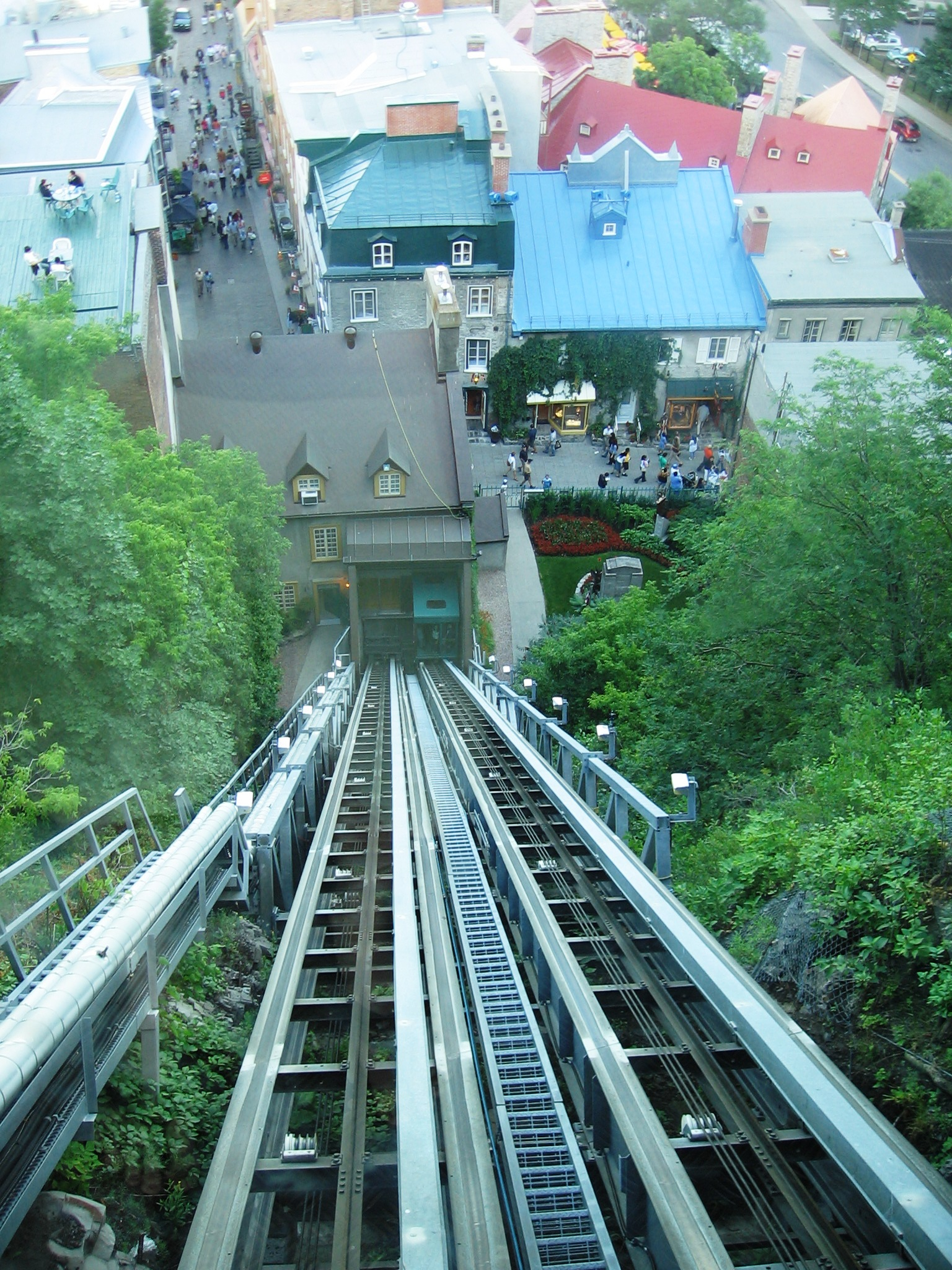
- View from the funicular, looking down on Rue Sous-le-Fort (straight ahead) and Rue du Petit-Champlain to the right

Overview
- Status: In use
- Locale: Quebec City, Quebec

Service
- Type: Funicular

History
- Opened: 1879

Technical
- Line length: 0.064 km (0.040 mi)
- Number of tracks: Double track
- Highest elevation: 59 m (194 ft)
- Maximum incline: 100%

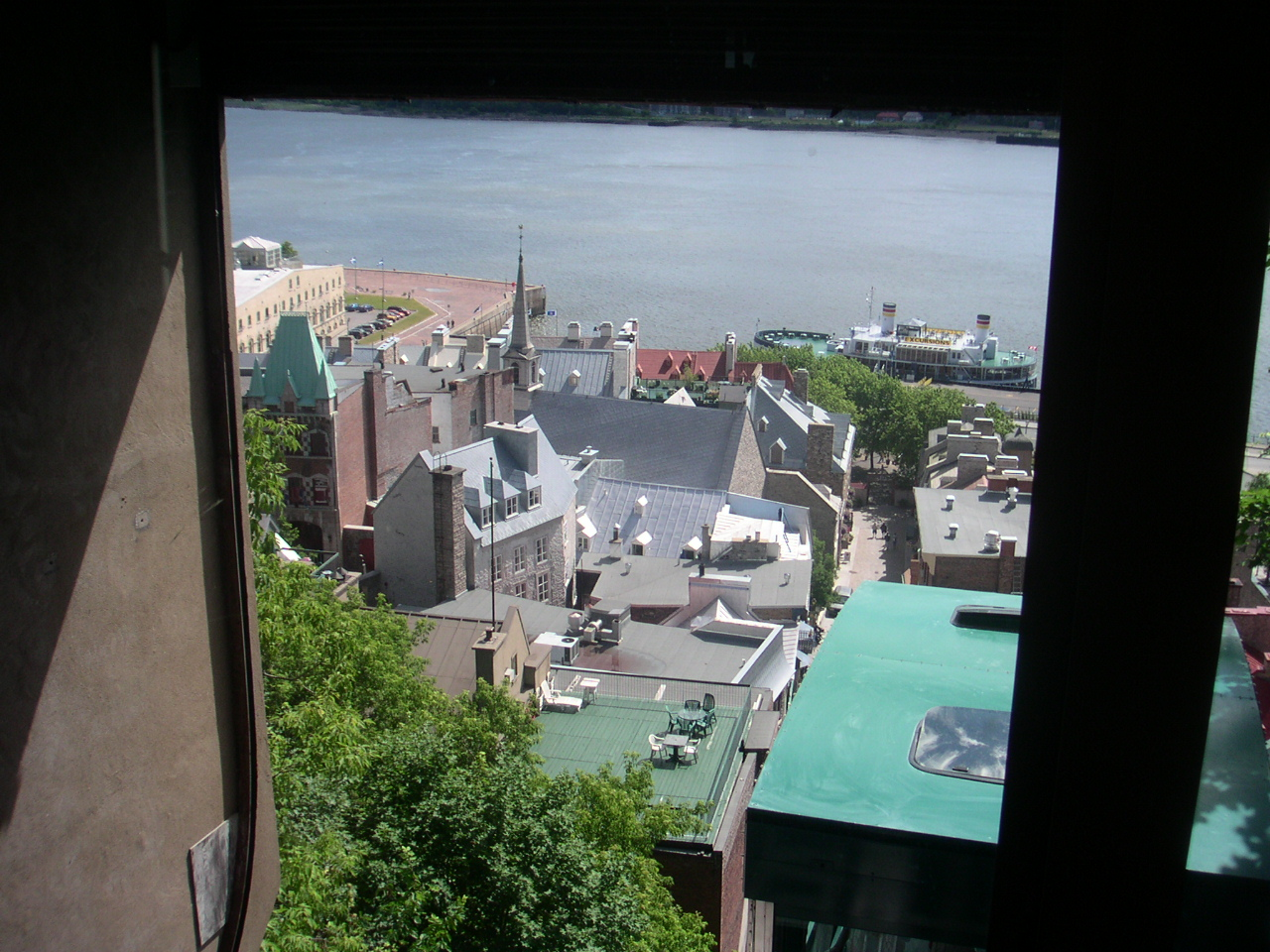
View from the funicular

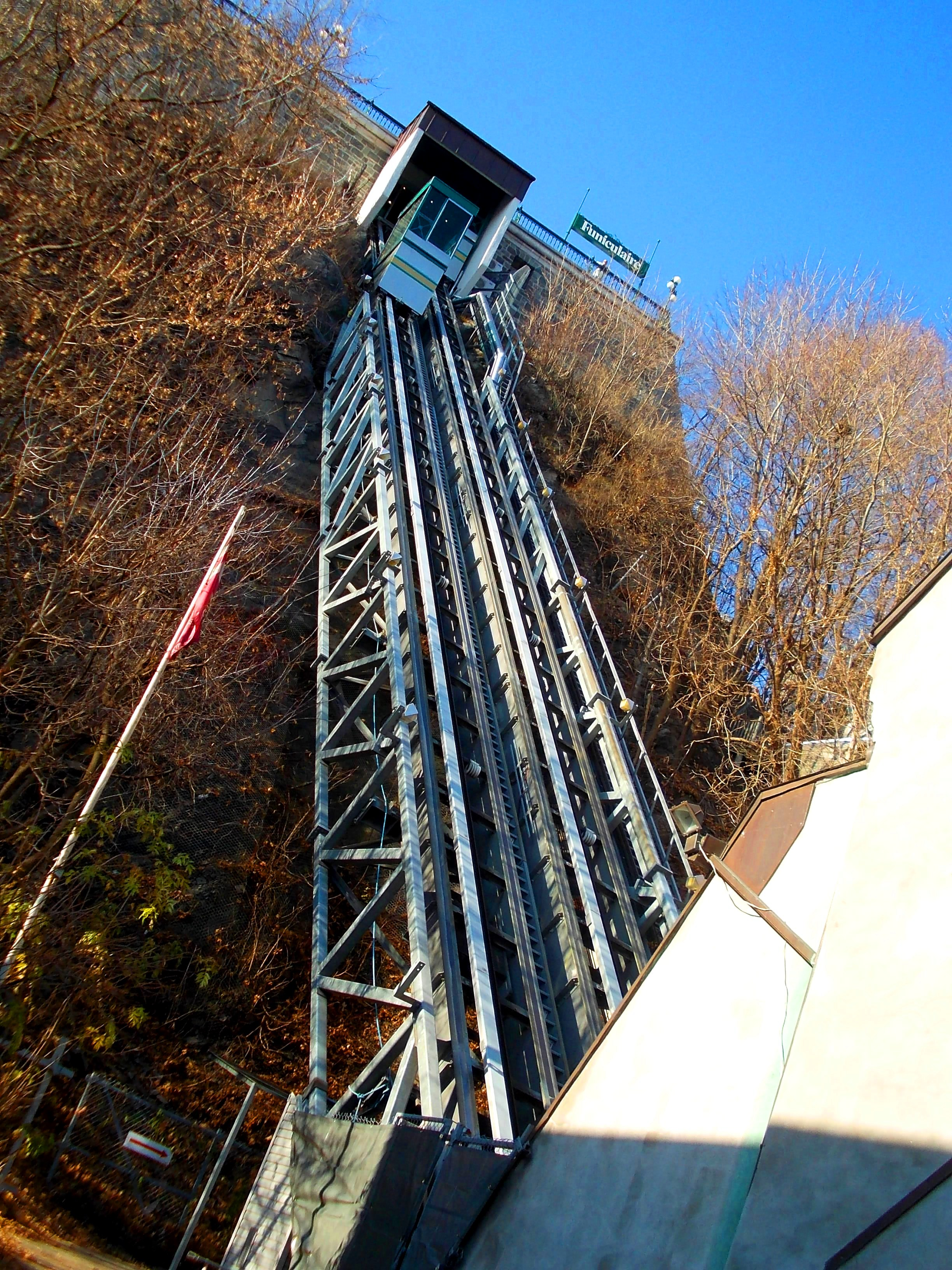
Old Quebec Funicular

The Old Quebec Funicular (French: Funiculaire du Vieux-Québec, pronounced [fynikylɛʁ dy vjø kebɛk]) is an inclined elevator, formerly a funicular railway, in the Old Quebec neighbourhood of Quebec City, Quebec, Canada. It links the Haute-Ville (Upper Town) at Dufferin Terrace to the Basse-Ville (Lower Town) at Rue du Petit-Champlain. The Basse-Ville includes such sites as the colonial-era Notre Dame des Victoires church, the historic Petit Champlain district, the port, and the Musée de la civilisation (Museum of Civilization). Climbing at a 45-degree angle, the railway covers a total distance of 64 metres (210 ft).

== History ==
The funicular opened on November 17, 1879, as a water balance railway. The line was converted to electrical operation in 1907. On July 2, 1945, a major fire destroyed the structure, necessitating a rebuild that was completed in 1946. Since then, major renovations have taken place in 1978 and 1998. In 2004, it celebrated 125 years of operating.

In October 1996, Briton Helen Tombs was killed when the cable snapped and the emergency brake failed to stop the cabin before it crashed into the lower station. As a result of this fatal crash, the funicular was closed and entirely revamped with modern technology. It reopened in 1998, technically as an inclined elevator, since both cabins are independent.

The funicular has the following technical parameters:

- Length: 64 metres (210 ft)
- Height: 59 metres (194 ft)
- Cars: 2
- Configuration: Double track
- Traction: Electricity

== See also ==
- List of funicular railways
