= Côte de la Montagne =

Prominent street in Quebec City, Canada

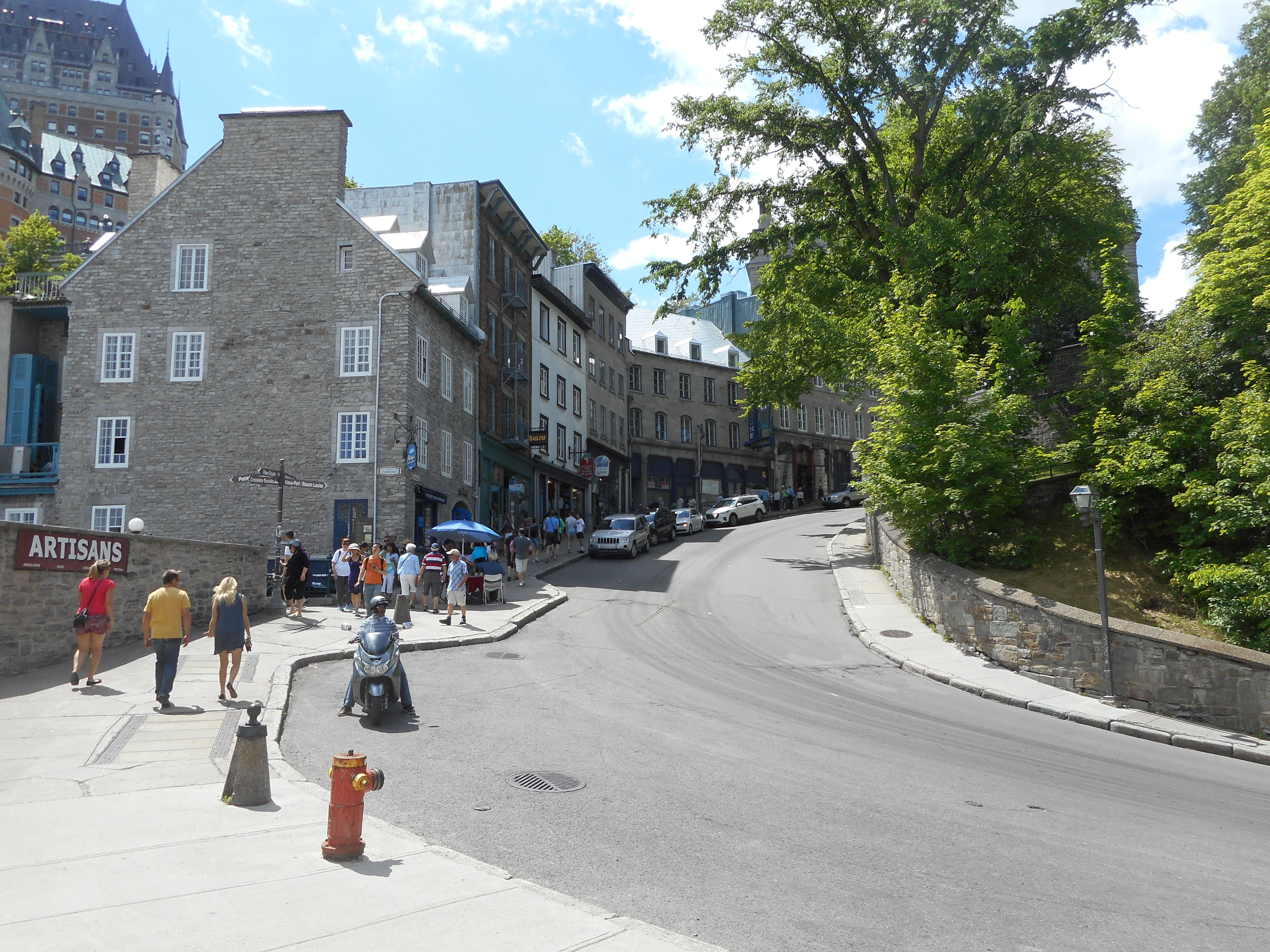
- Taken just before the entrance to the Breakneck Stairs (left), the street's incline is evident in this view. The Château Frontenac is towering in the background
- Interactive map of Côte de la Montagne
- Location: Québec, Québec, Canada
- East end: Rue Dalhousie
- West end: Rue Port Dauphine

Construction
- Completion: c. 1620 (406 years ago)

Côte de la Montagne is a street in the Canadian city of Québec, Québec, Canada. It climbs, in a winding fashion, Cap Diamant, connecting the Lower Town to the Upper Town. It begins at Rue Dalhousie in the east and ends at Rue Port Dauphine in the west. Directly opposite its western terminus is the building of the Roman Catholic Archdiocese of Quebec.

Part way up the hill, the Breakneck Stairs, built in the 17th century, connects the pedestrian with the Lower Town at Rue Sous-le-Fort and Rue du Petit-Champlain.

== History ==
In 1620, Samuel de Champlain, the city's founder, built his home at the top of Cap Diamant. He then drew a road, côte de la Montagne, which still follows the same route today.

== Gallery ==
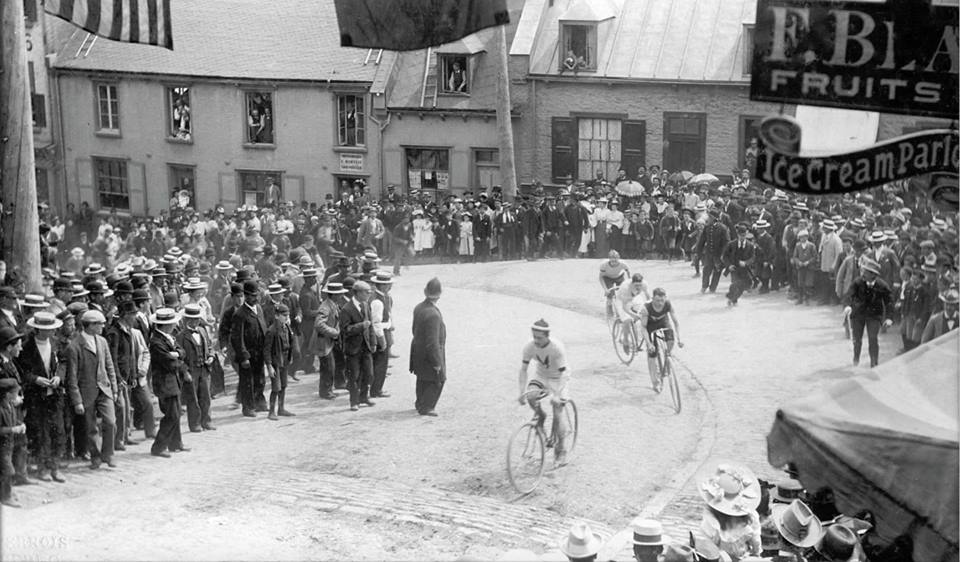
A bicycle race up the hill, 1896

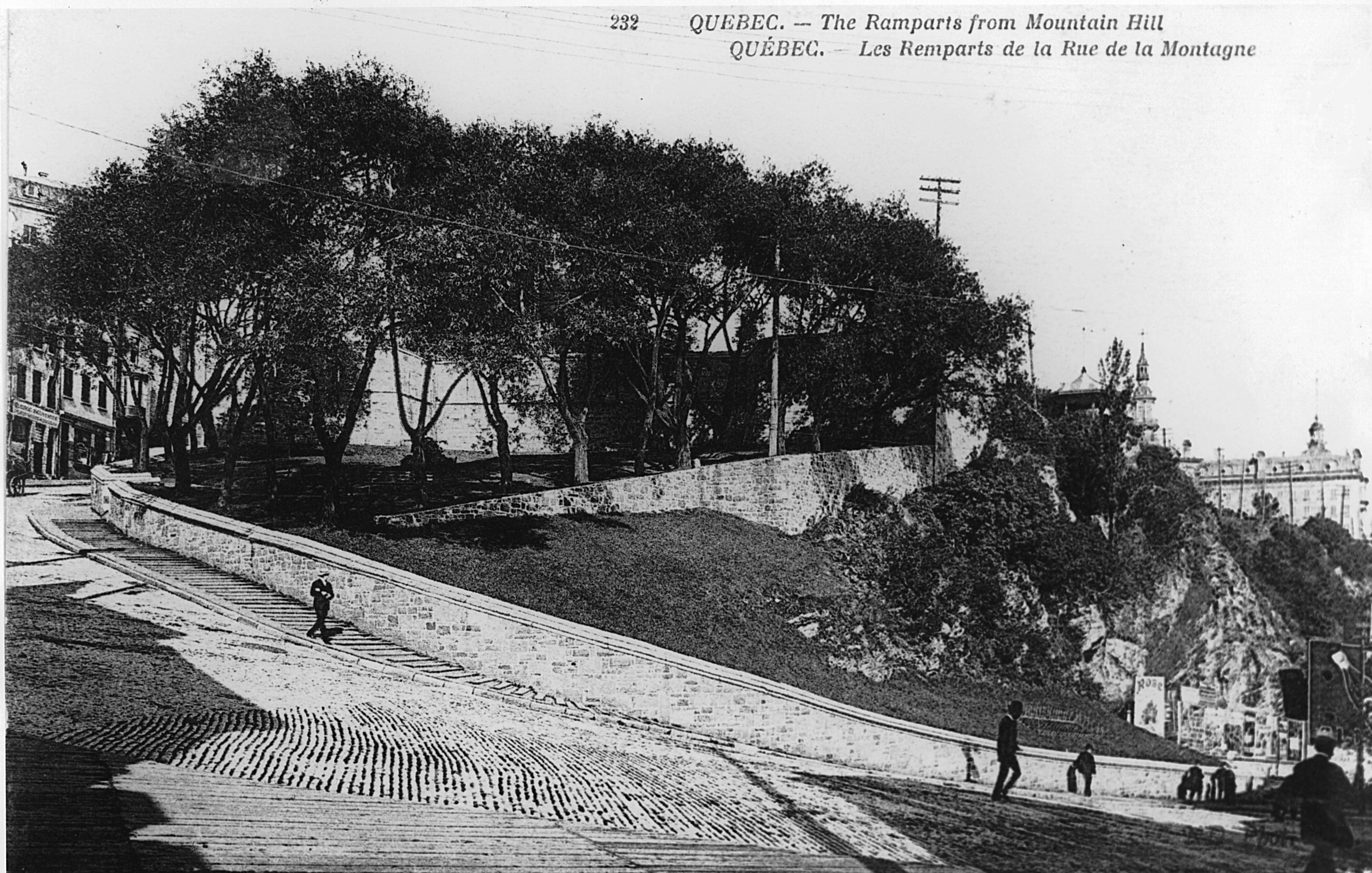
A circa-1910 view

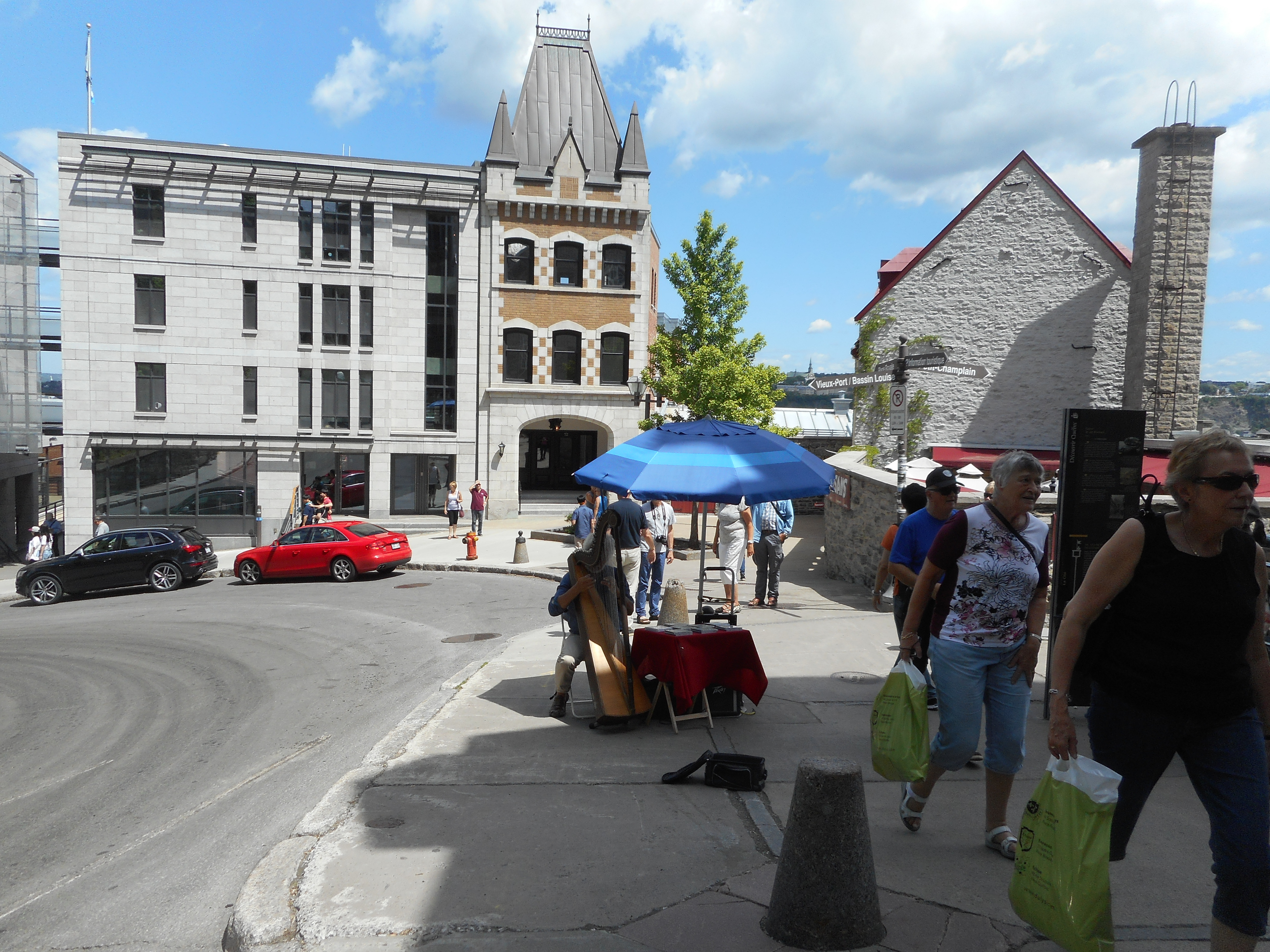
The upper end of the Breakneck Stairs is on the right, opposite the vendor's table

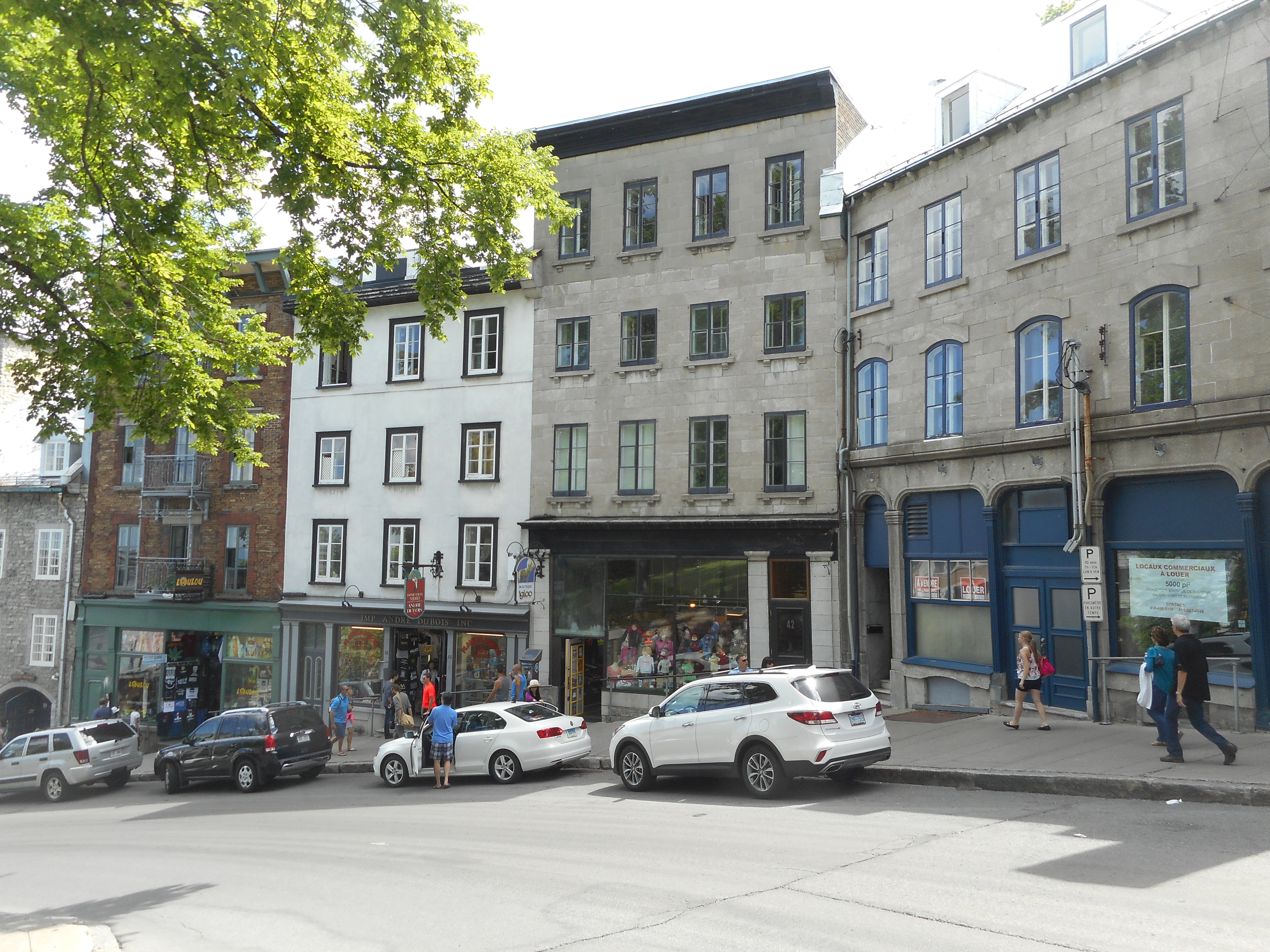
Shops on the street

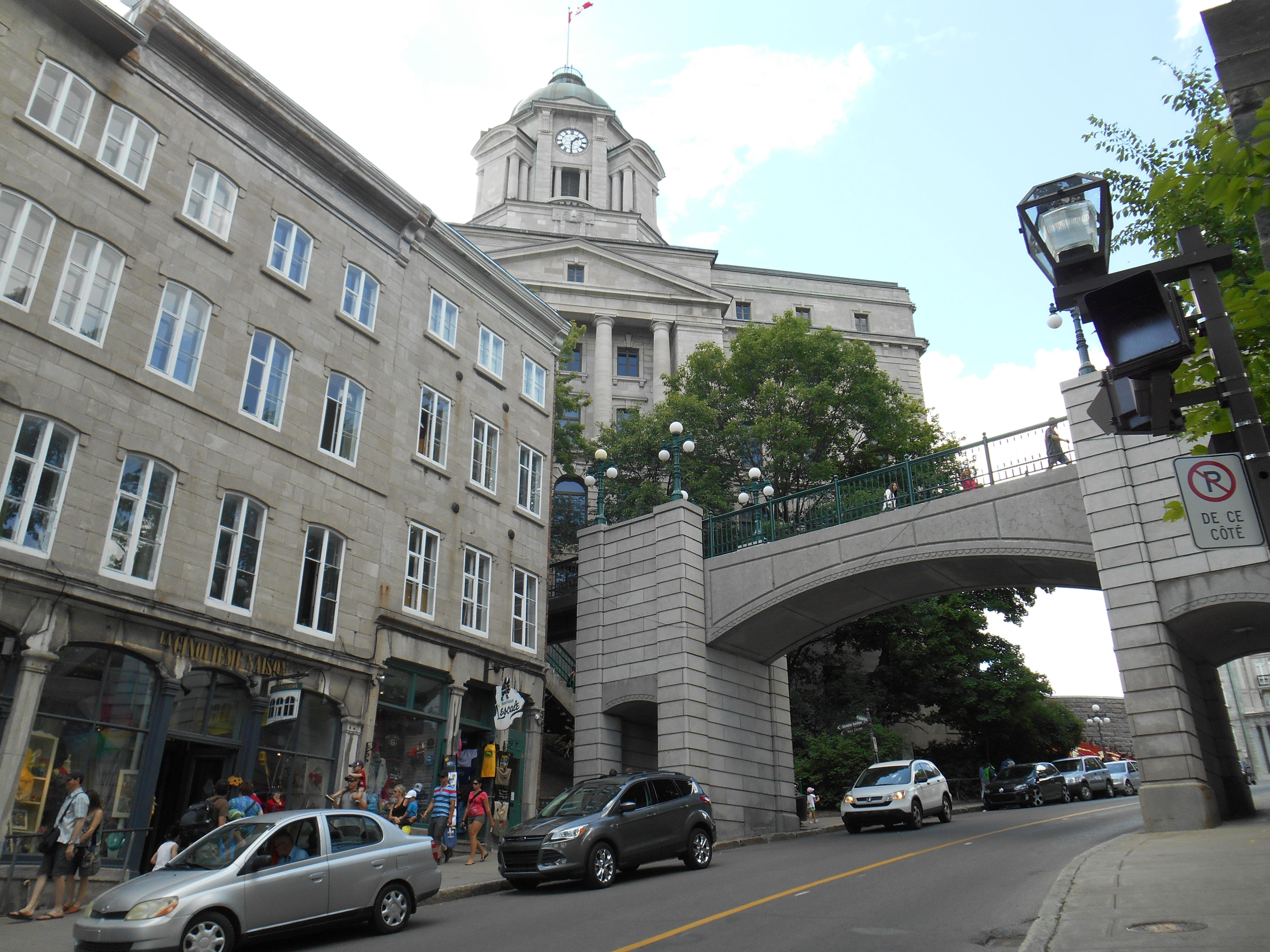
Prescott Gate and, in the background, the Louis S. St. Laurent Building

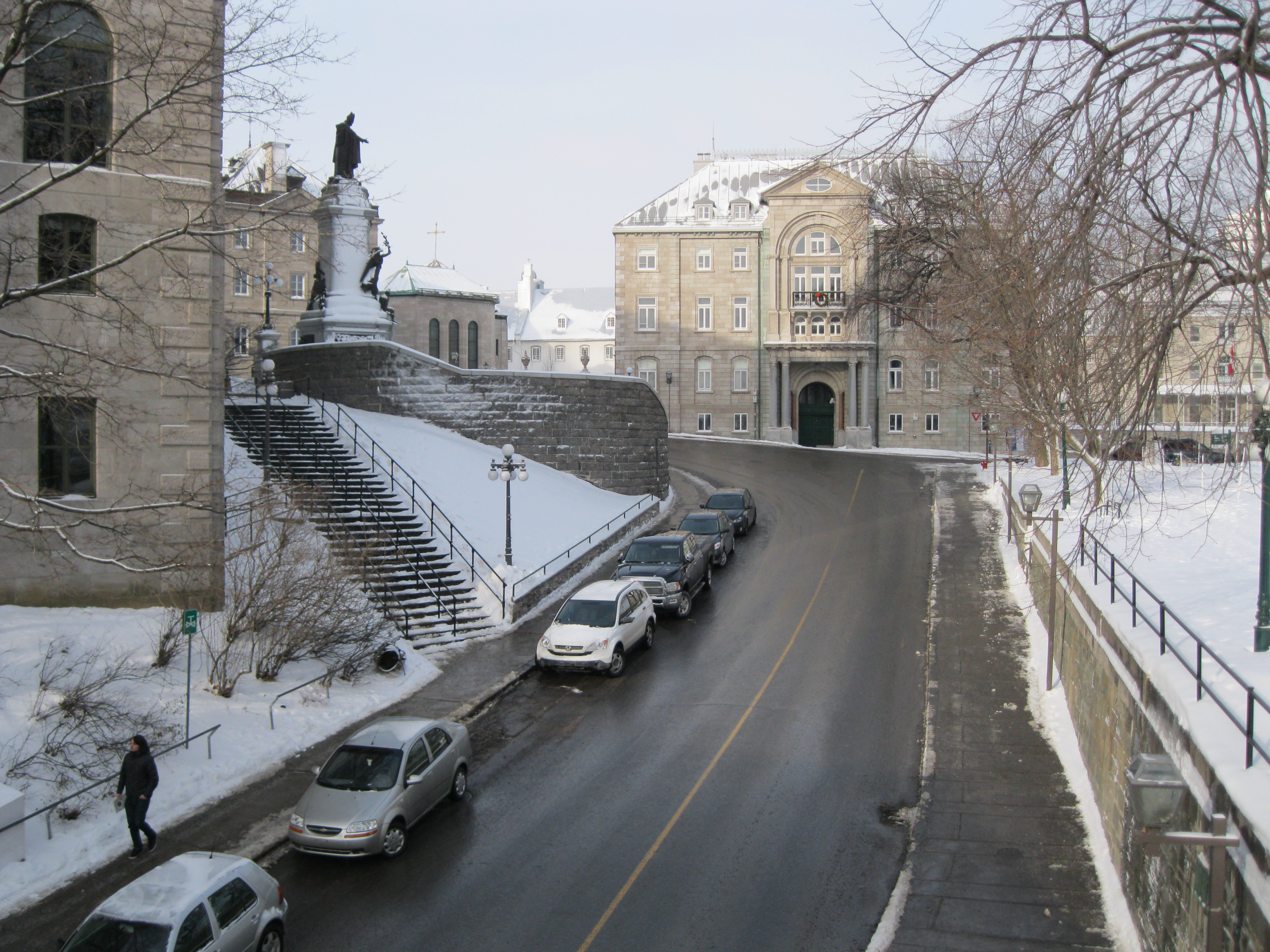
The western end of the street, with building of the Roman Catholic Archdiocese of Quebec across from its junction with Rue Port Dauphine
