= 2025 Grand Prix Cycliste de Québec =

One-day cycling race in Canada

2025 UCI World Tour, race 33 of 36
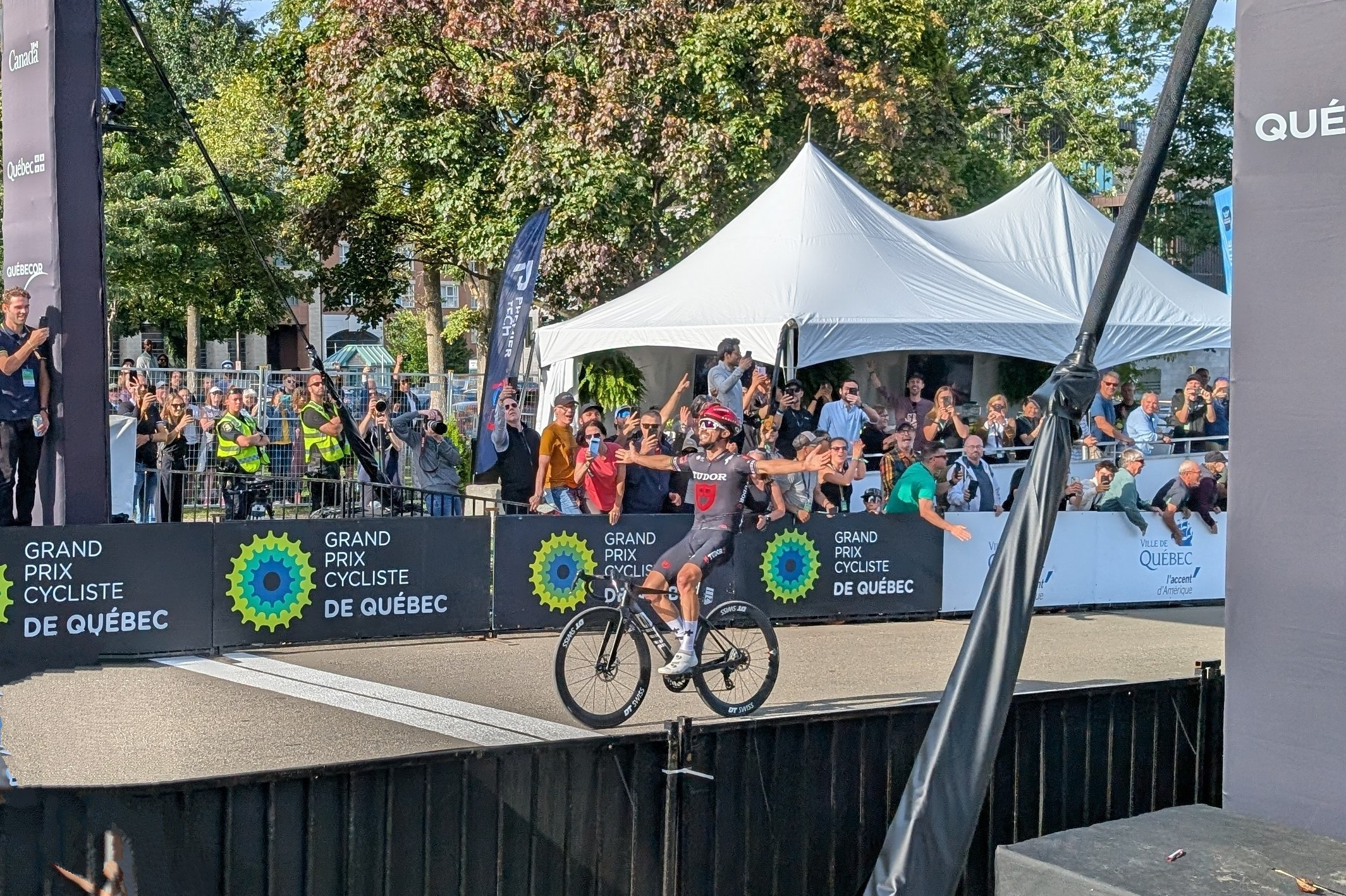
- Julian Alaphilippe taking victory

Race details
- Dates: 12 September 2025
- Stages: 1
- Distance: 216 km (134 mi)
- Winning time: 5h 04' 32"

Results
| | Winner | Julian Alaphilippe (FRA) | (Tudor Pro Cycling Team) |
| | Second | Pavel Sivakov (FRA) | (UAE Team Emirates XRG) |
| | Third | Alberto Bettiol (ITA) | (XDS Astana Team) |

The 2025 Grand Prix Cycliste de Québec was a road cycling one-day race that took place on 12 September 2025 in Quebec City, Canada. It was the 14th edition of the Grand Prix Cycliste de Québec and the 33rd event of the 2025 UCI World Tour. The race was won by Julian Alaphilippe.

== Teams ==
All eighteen UCI WorldTeams, four UCI ProTeams, and the Canadian national made up the twenty-three teams that participated in the race.

UCI WorldTeams

- Alpecin–Deceuninck
- Arkéa–B&B Hotels
- Cofidis
- Decathlon–AG2R La Mondiale
- EF Education–EasyPost
- Groupama–FDJ
- Ineos Grenadiers
- Intermarché–Wanty
- Lidl–Trek
- Movistar Team
- Red Bull–Bora–Hansgrohe
- Soudal–Quick-Step
- Team Bahrain Victorious
- Team Picnic–PostNL
- Team Jayco–AlUla
- UAE Team Emirates XRG
- Visma–Lease a Bike
- XDS Astana Team

UCI ProTeams

- Israel–Premier Tech
- Lotto
- Tudor Pro Cycling Team
- Uno-X Mobility

National Teams

- Canada

== Race schedule ==
The race began with an early breakaway of four riders who formed a group right from the start and gained a lead of up to six minutes over the peloton. This attempt was then overtaken, paving the way for a new offensive in the second half of the race: a group of a dozen riders, including Julian Alaphilippe (Tudor), Christophe Laporte (Lease a Bike), Tim Wellens (UAE Team Emirates XRG), Quinn Simmons (Lidl-Trek), Pavel Sivakov (UAE Team Emirates XRG), Alberto Bettiol (XDS Astana) and Quinten Hermans (Alpecin-Deceuninck), broke away about 80 kilometres from the finish line.

Alaphilippe, attentive to the race but unwilling to collaborate in this breakaway, saved his energy by letting other competitors lead the effort. With 13 km to go, Tadej Pogačar attempted an attack from the peloton, but was unable to catch up with the leaders.

The decisive move came on the final climb up the Côte de la Montagne: Alaphilippe attacked his breakaway companions and managed to break away into the lead. He then held off the chasing group to win solo on Avenue George VI, ahead of Pavel Sivakov and Alberto Bettiol.

== Result ==
Result
| Rank | Rider | Team | Time |
|---|---|---|---|
| 1 | Julian Alaphilippe (FRA) | Tudor Pro Cycling Team | 5h 04' 32" |
| 2 | Pavel Sivakov (FRA) | UAE Team Emirates XRG | + 2" |
| 3 | Alberto Bettiol (ITA) | XDS Astana Team | + 4" |
| 4 | Mattias Skjelmose (DEN) | Lidl–Trek | + 14" |
| 5 | Matej Mohorič (SLO) | Team Bahrain Victorious | + 14" |
| 6 | Quinten Hermans (BEL) | Alpecin–Deceuninck | + 14" |
| 7 | Anthon Charmig (DEN) | XDS Astana Team | + 16" |
| 8 | Arnaud De Lie (BEL) | Lotto | + 17" |
| 9 | Michael Matthews (AUS) | Team Jayco–AlUla | + 17" |
| 10 | Corbin Strong (NZL) | Israel–Premier Tech | + 17" |
