= Petit Champlain =

Neighbourhood in Quebec City, Canada

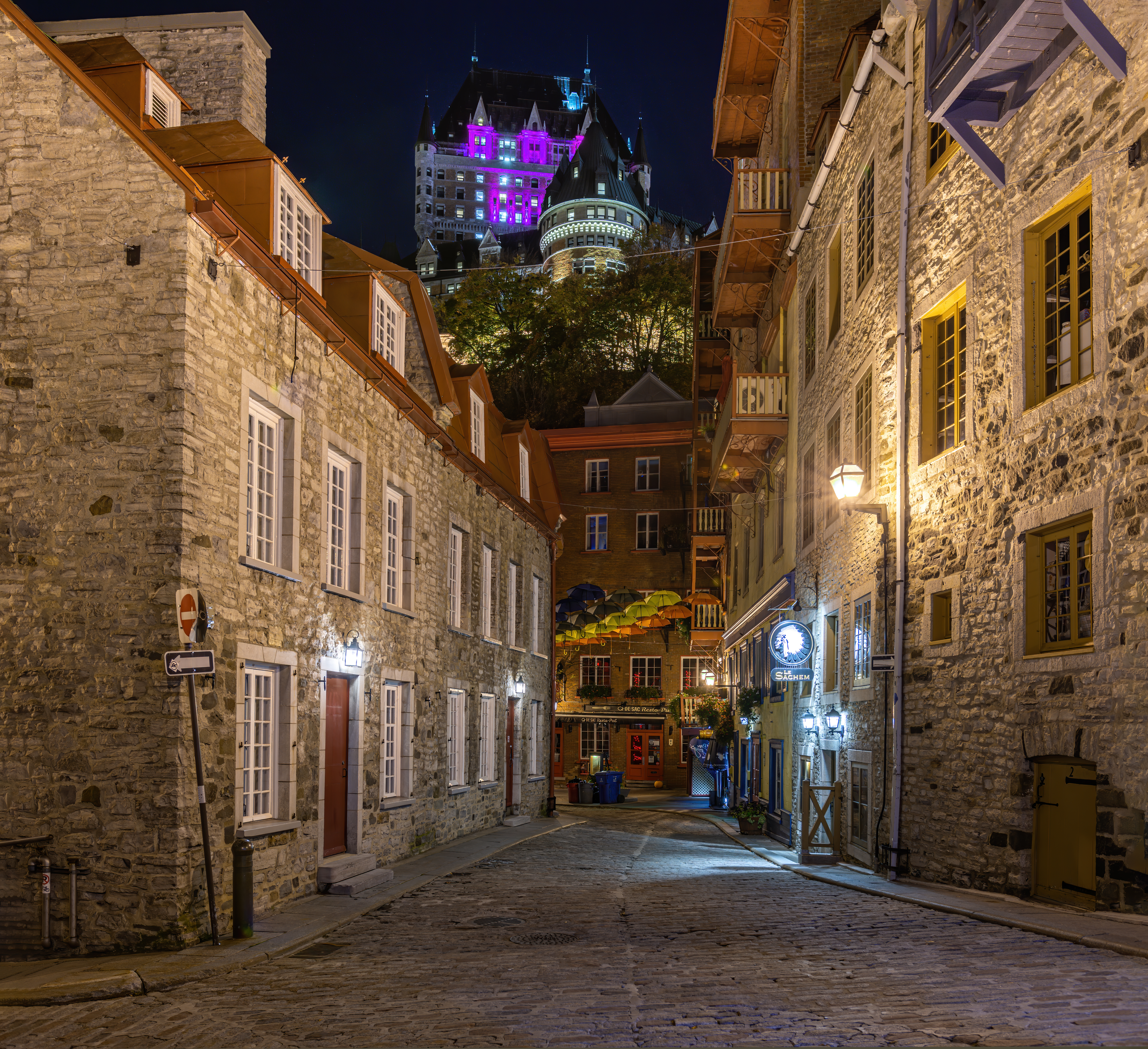
- Interactive map of Petit Champlain
- Coordinates: 46°48′47″N 71°12′09″W
- Country: Canada
- Province: Quebec
- City: Quebec City
- Borough: La Cité-Limoilou
- Time zone: UTC−5 (Eastern)
  - Summer (DST): UTC−4 (EDT)
- Website: www.quartierpetitchamplain.com

Petit Champlain (French pronunciation: [pəti ʃɑ̃plɛ̃]) is a small commercial zone in Quebec City, Quebec, Canada. It is located in the neighbourhood of Vieux-Québec–Cap-Blanc–colline Parlementaire in the borough of La Cité-Limoilou, near Place Royale and its Notre-Dame-des-Victoires Church. Its main street is the Rue du Petit-Champlain at the foot of Cap Diamant. It is claimed that it's the oldest commercial district in North America.

In French it is referred to as a quartier (neighbourhood) although it is not an official one recognised by the City. It is named after Samuel de Champlain, who founded Quebec City in 1608.

== Attractions ==
=== Rue du Petit-Champlain ===
Rue du Petit-Champlain is around 0.16 miles (0.26 km) long, and runs from its convergence with Rue Sous-le-Fort in the north to Boulevard Champlain in the south.

=== Rue du Petit-Champlain fresco ===
The fresco painted on the side of the building at 102 rue du Petit-Champlain is a trompe-l'œil measuring 100m^{2} (900 ft^{2}). It represents the history of the district, the bombardments of 1759, the landslides, and the fires which have occurred in the district.

=== Breakneck Stairs ===
The Breakneck Stairs or Breakneck Steps (French: Escalier casse-cou), Quebec City's oldest stairway, were built in 1635. Today they are a popular viewpoint for tourists to view rue du Petit-Champlain.

== In popular culture ==
A red door on Rue du Petit-Champlain, which serves as an emergency exit for the Théâtre Petit Champlain, was used as a filming location in the 2016 South Korean television series Guardian: The Lonely and Great God. In the series, the door represents a portal through which the characters played by Gong Yoo and Kim Go-eun travel between South Korea and Quebec City. Following the programme's broadcast, it became a popular photography destination for fans and one of the city's best-known examples of television-induced tourism.
