= Quebec rockslide =

Coordinates: 46.8080°N 71.2030°W

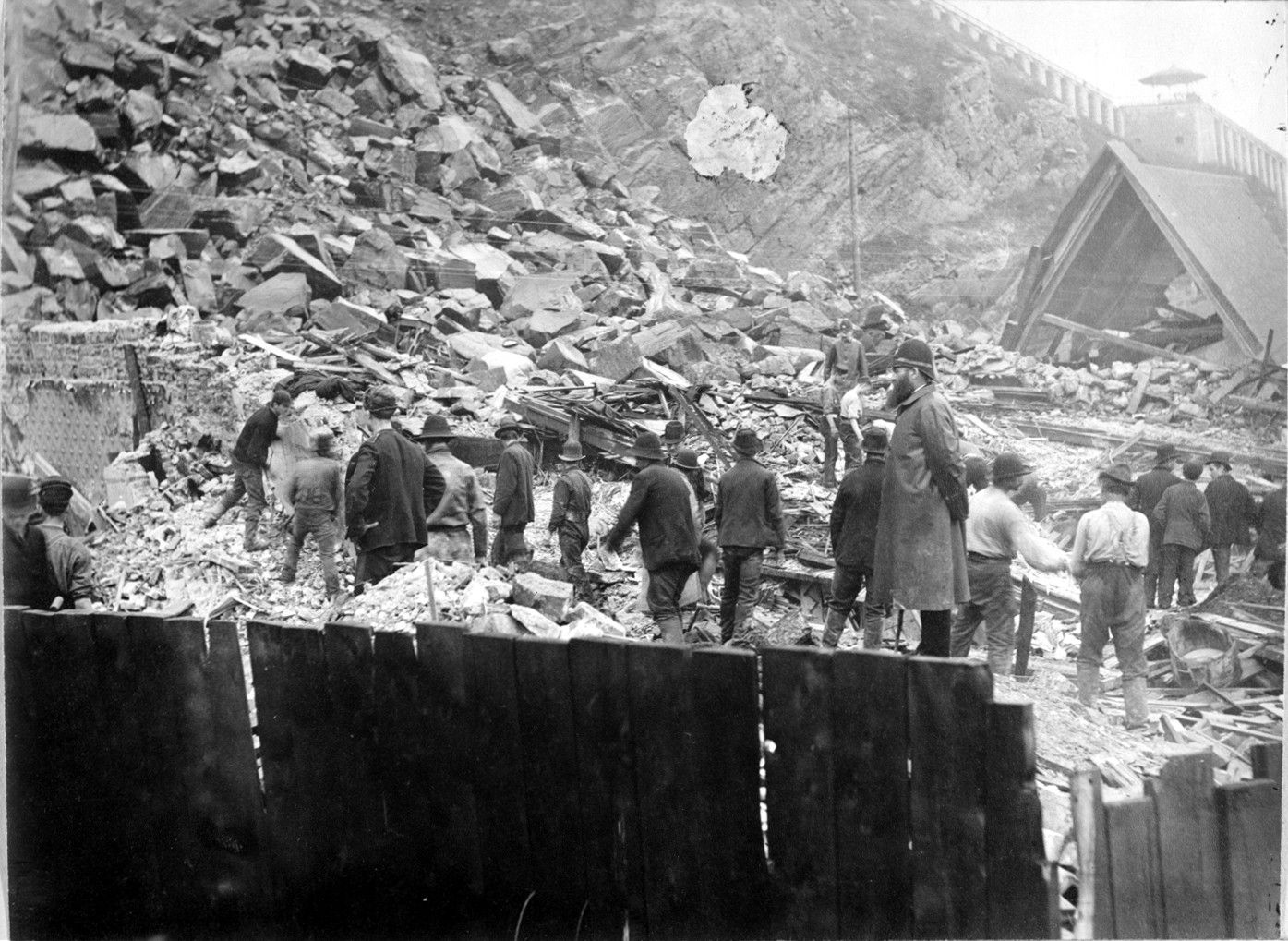
Champlain Street after the rockslide, September 1889

The Quebec rockslide occurred on September 19, 1889, after a day of heavy rain in Quebec City, Canada. An overhanging piece of slate rock broke off from Cap Diamant and fell 90 metres (300 feet) onto the houses below. The homes of 28 families on Champlain Street were crushed, burying roughly 100 people under 24 metres (80 feet) of broken slate rock. The final death toll exceeded 40 people.

== Gallery ==
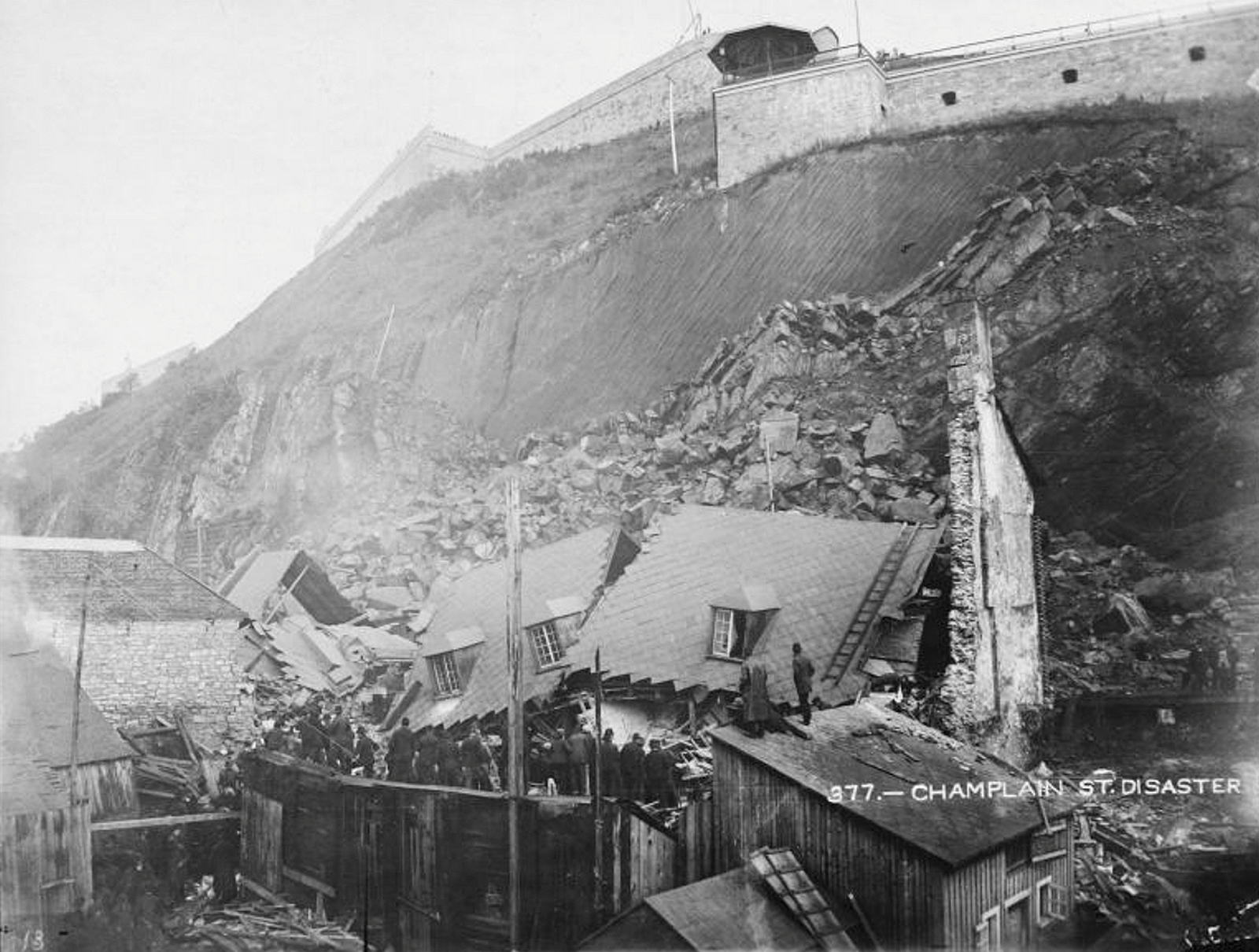

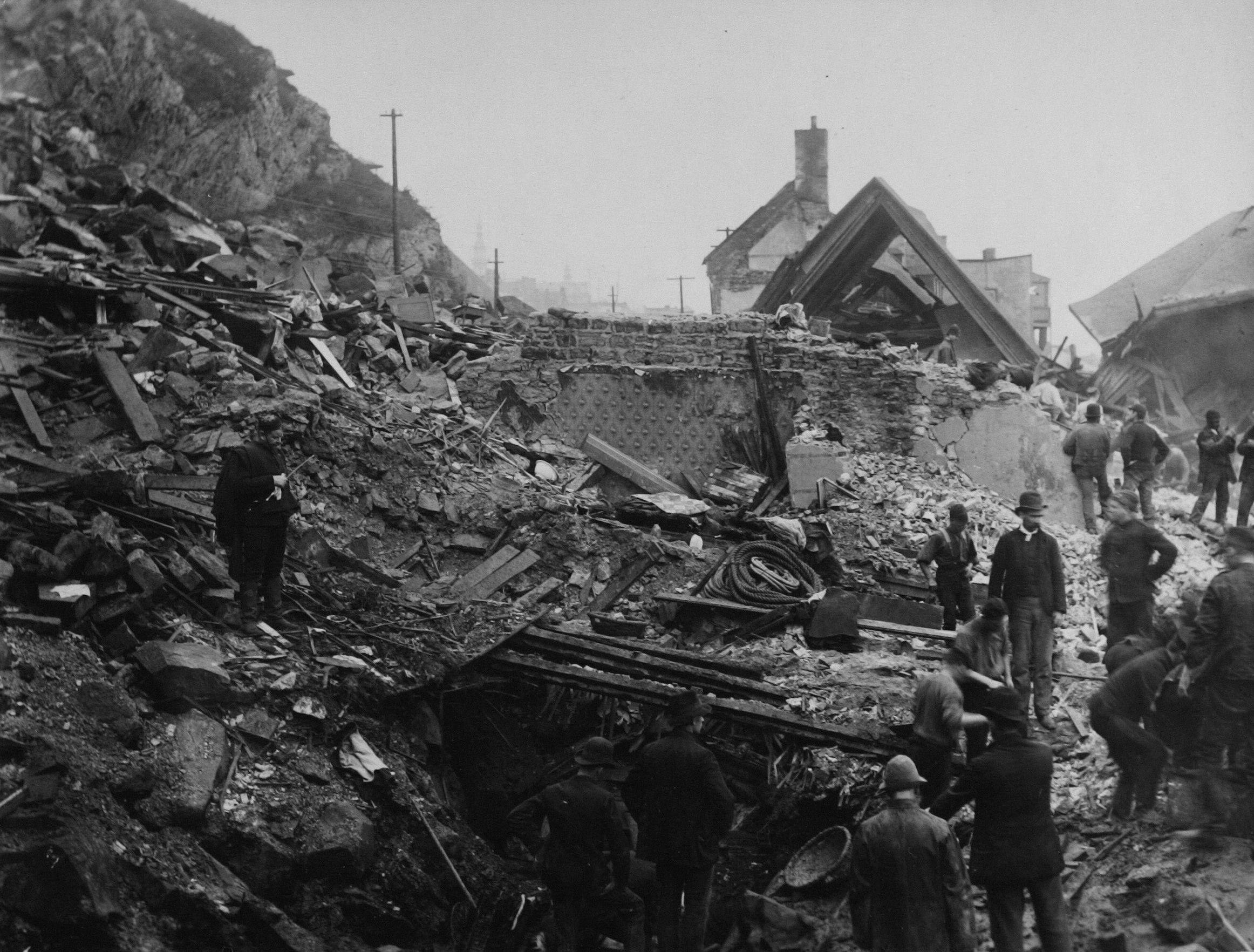

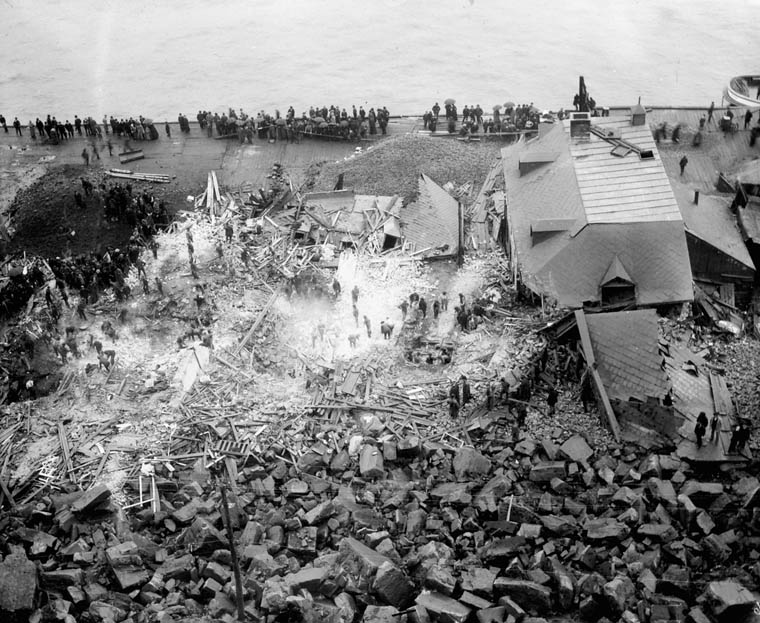
