= Terrasse Dufferin =

Boardwalk terrace in Quebec City, Canada

Coordinates: 46.8111°N 71.2043°W

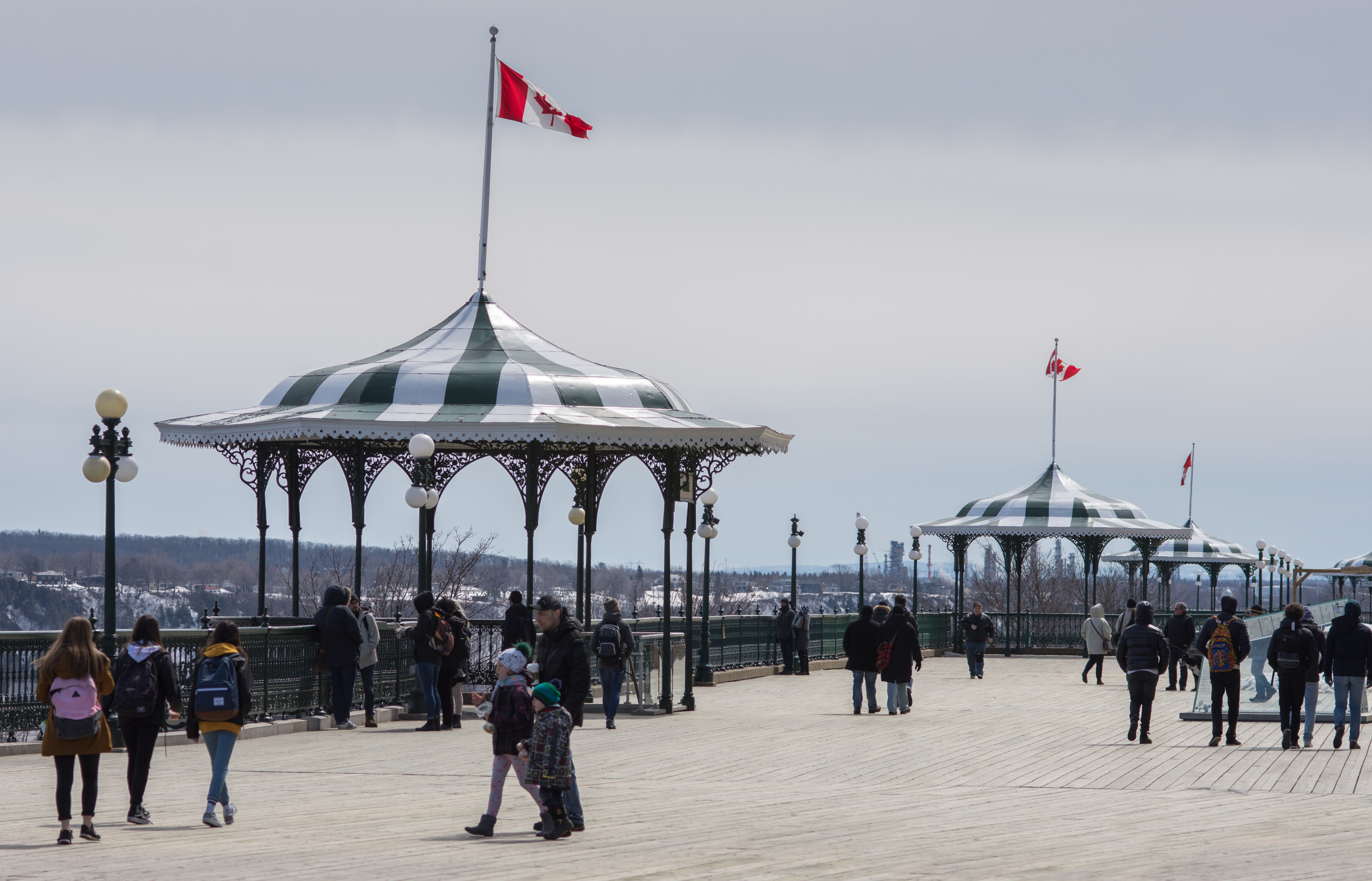
Terrasse Dufferin

Terrasse Dufferin (Dufferin Terrace) is a boardwalk that wraps around the Château Frontenac in Quebec City, Quebec, towards the Citadelle, overlooking the St. Lawrence River.

== History ==
The terrace was built under the direction of the Marquess of Dufferin, the then Governor General of Canada, and eventually named for him. It was officially inaugurated by Dufferin's viceregal successor, John Campbell, Marquess of Lorne, and his wife, Princess Louise, on 28 June 1879.

The terrace is maintained by Parks Canada as part of the Saint-Louis Forts and Châteaux National Historic Site.

== Features ==
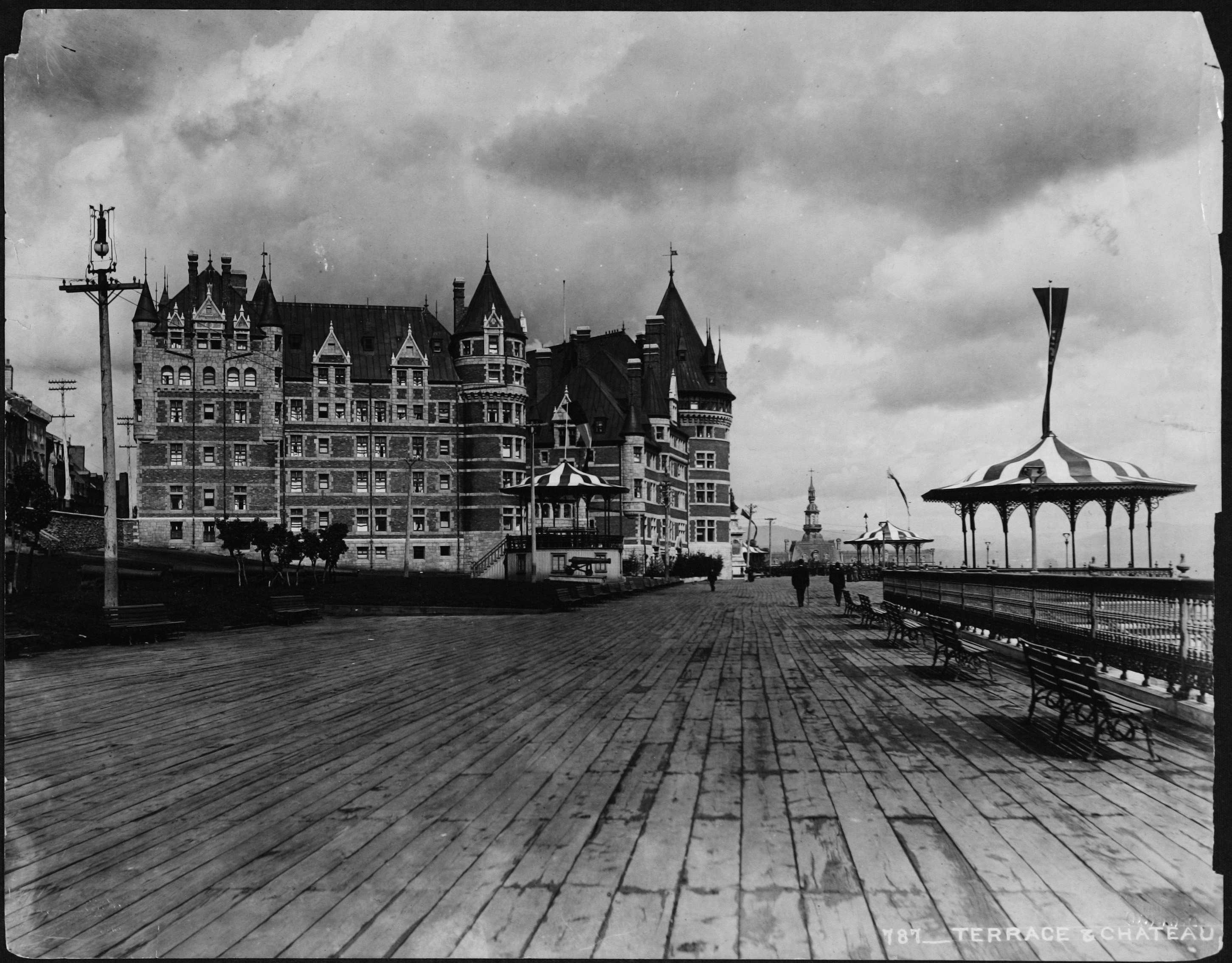
A c. 1900 view

The terrace consists of a boardwalk with six gazebos and benches from Château Frontenac (and previous by Château Haldimand) to the Citadelle of Quebec (accessed via a set of stairs). The gazebos are named (in order from north to south): Frontenac, Lorne, Princess Louise, Victoria, Dufferin, and Plessis.

On the south end of the terrasse is a 150 metres (490 ft) ramp or Terrasse Dufferin Slides (c. 1898) used annually as a toboggan run during Quebec Winter Carnival or the Carnaval de Québec from late January to mid-February. Also located at the southern end is access to the Governors' Promenade, a walkway to the Plains of Abraham built into the cliffs below the Citadel.

Adjacent to the Frontenac gazebo at the northern end is the Funiculaire du Vieux-Québec, which descends to Rue du Petit-Champlain in the Lower Town.

== Saint-Louis Forts and Châteaux ==
Beneath sections of the terrace are the remains of Saint Louis Forts as well as Château Saint-Louis, residence for French and British Governors. These can be viewed through three skylights built into the Terrasse and, when it is open, by a walkway that extends under the Terrasse.
