= Rue du Petit-Champlain =

Prominent street in Quebec City, Canada

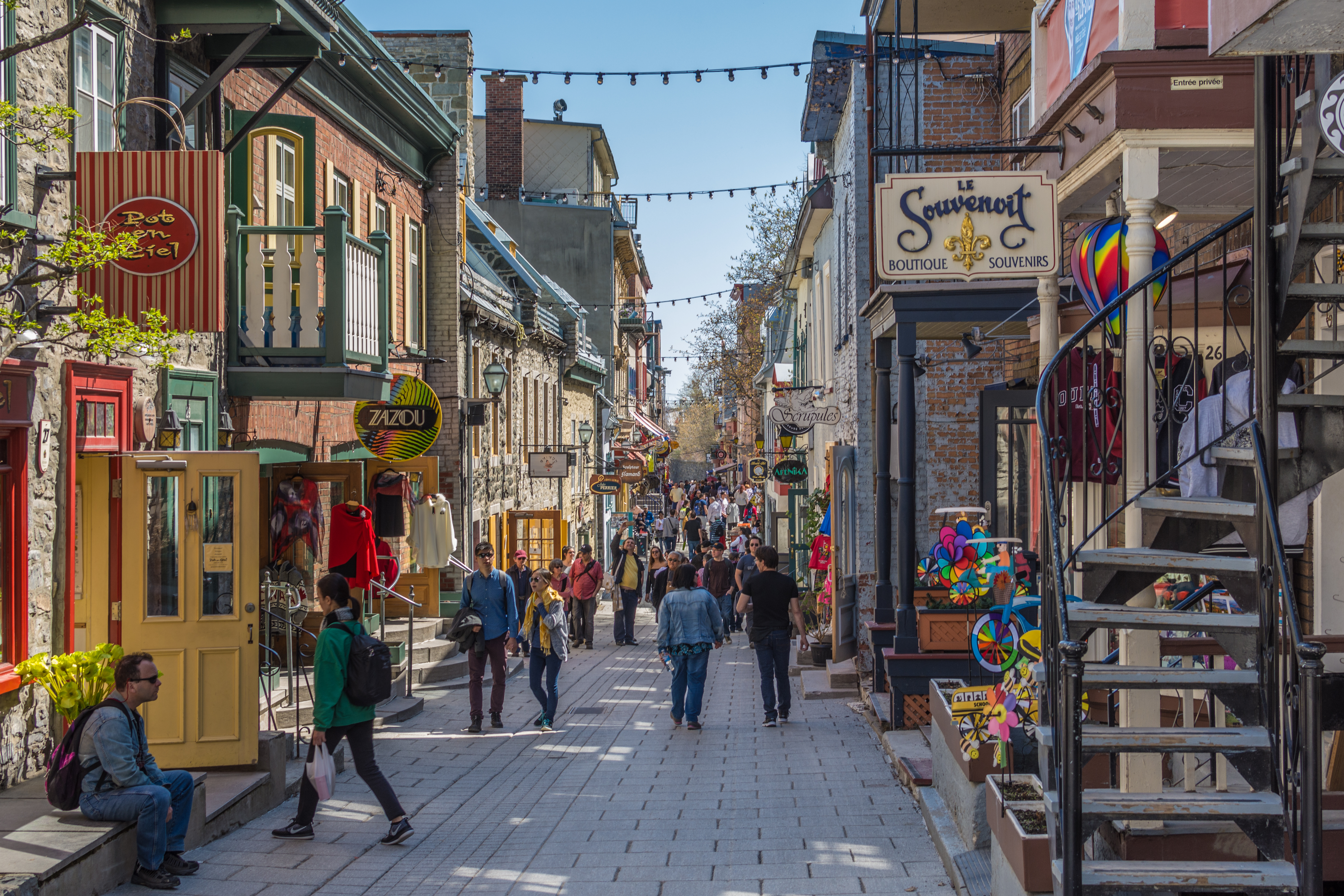
- Looking south along Rue du Petit-Champlain, 2018
- Interactive map of Rue du Petit-Champlain
- Length: 0.16 mi (0.26 km)
- Location: Quebec City, Quebec, Canada
- North end: Rue Sous-le-Fort
- South end: Boulevard Champlain

Rue du Petit-Champlain (French pronunciation: [ʁy dy pəti ʃɑ̃plɛ̃], Little Champlain Street) is a street in the Canadian city of Quebec City, Quebec. It is located in the Petit Champlain commercial district, at the foot of Cap Diamant, and contains many boutique shops. Quartier du Petit Champlain is claimed to be the oldest commercial district in North America. It is named for Samuel de Champlain, who founded Quebec City in 1608.

Rue du Petit-Champlain is around 0.16 miles (0.26 km) long, and runs from its convergence with Rue Sous-le-Fort in the north to Boulevard Champlain in the south. A popular viewing point of the street, the Breakneck Stairs (or Breakneck Steps), are located at the northern end of the street.

Just beyond the steps is the lower entrance of the Funiculaire du Vieux-Québec, an electric cableway established in 1879. It takes passengers up and down Cap Diamant to and from Dufferin Terrace, beside the Château Frontenac. It climbs at a 45-degree angle, covering a total distance of 64 metres (210 ft).

Around halfway along the street, on its western side, is Parc Félix-Leclerc.

The western side of the street contains frontages of buildings, in the shadow of Cap Diamant to their rears, whereas the rears of the buildings facing Boulevard Champlain occupy the eastern side.

A fresco painted on the side of the building at number 102 is a trompe-l'œil measuring 100m^{2} (900 ft^{2}). It represents the history of the district, the bombardments of 1759, the landslides, and the fires which have occurred in the district.

== Gallery ==
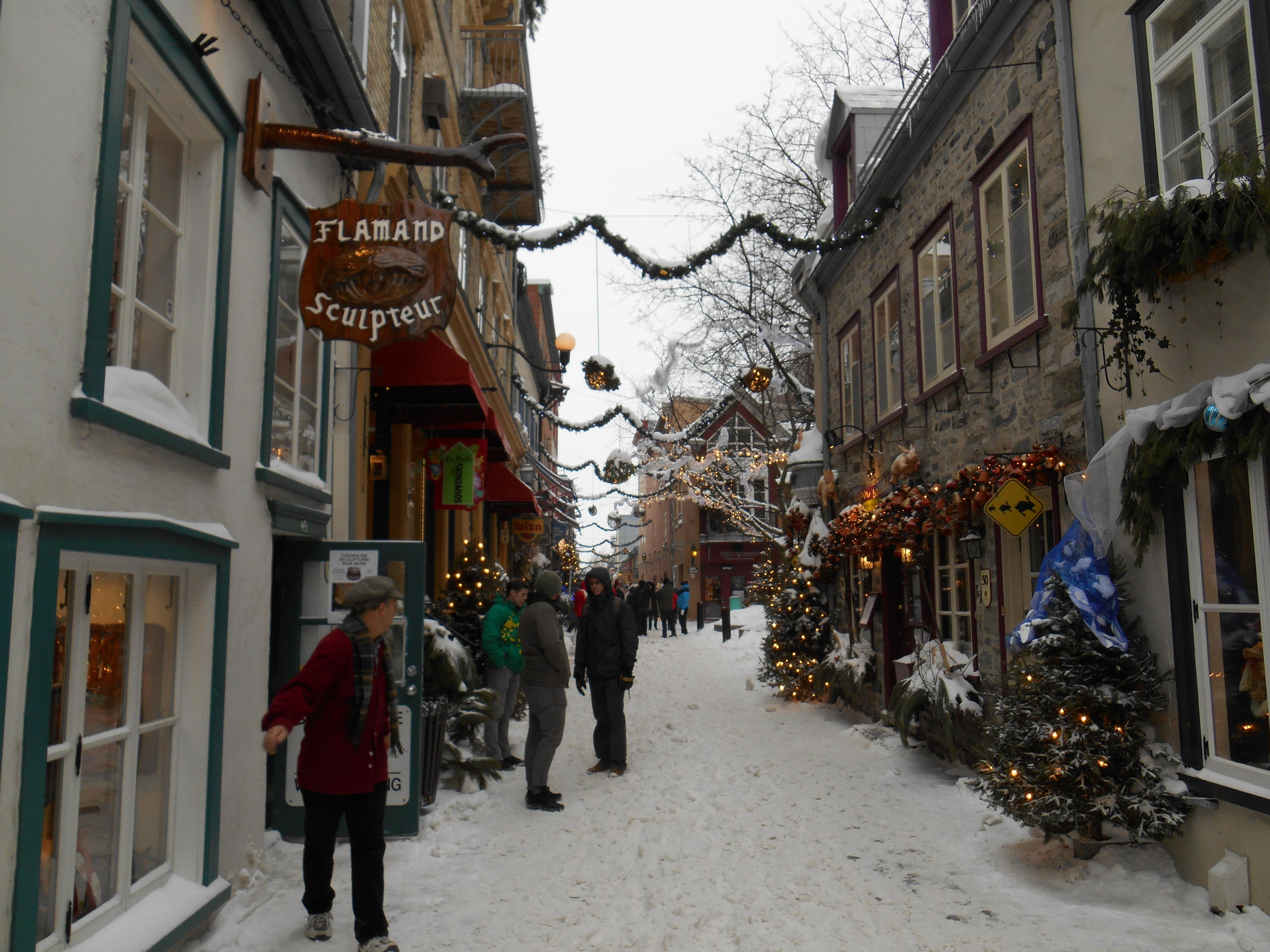
The street in winter

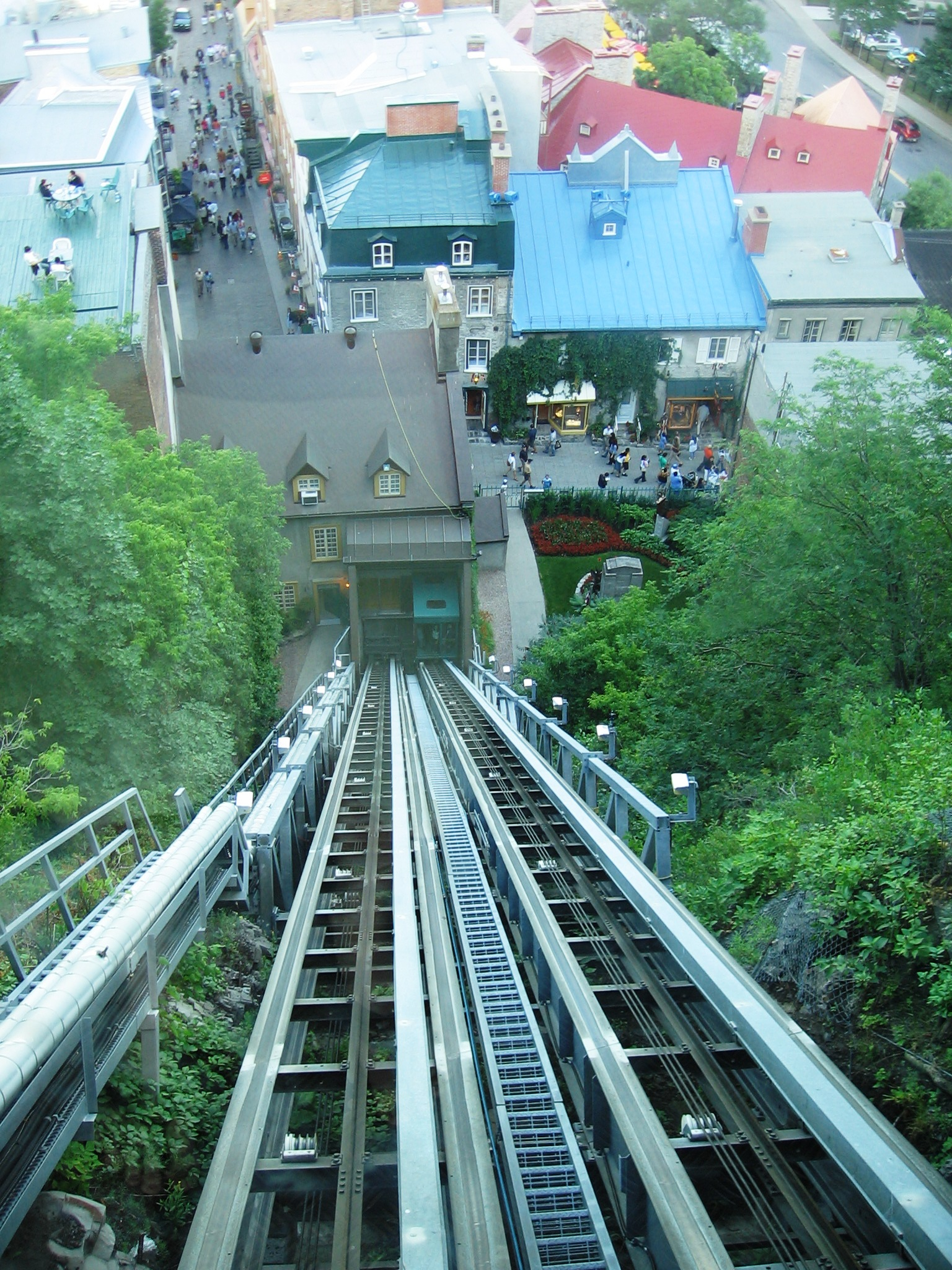
View from the Funiculaire du Vieux-Québec, looking down on Rue Sous-le-Fort (straight ahead) and Rue du Petit-Champlain to the right

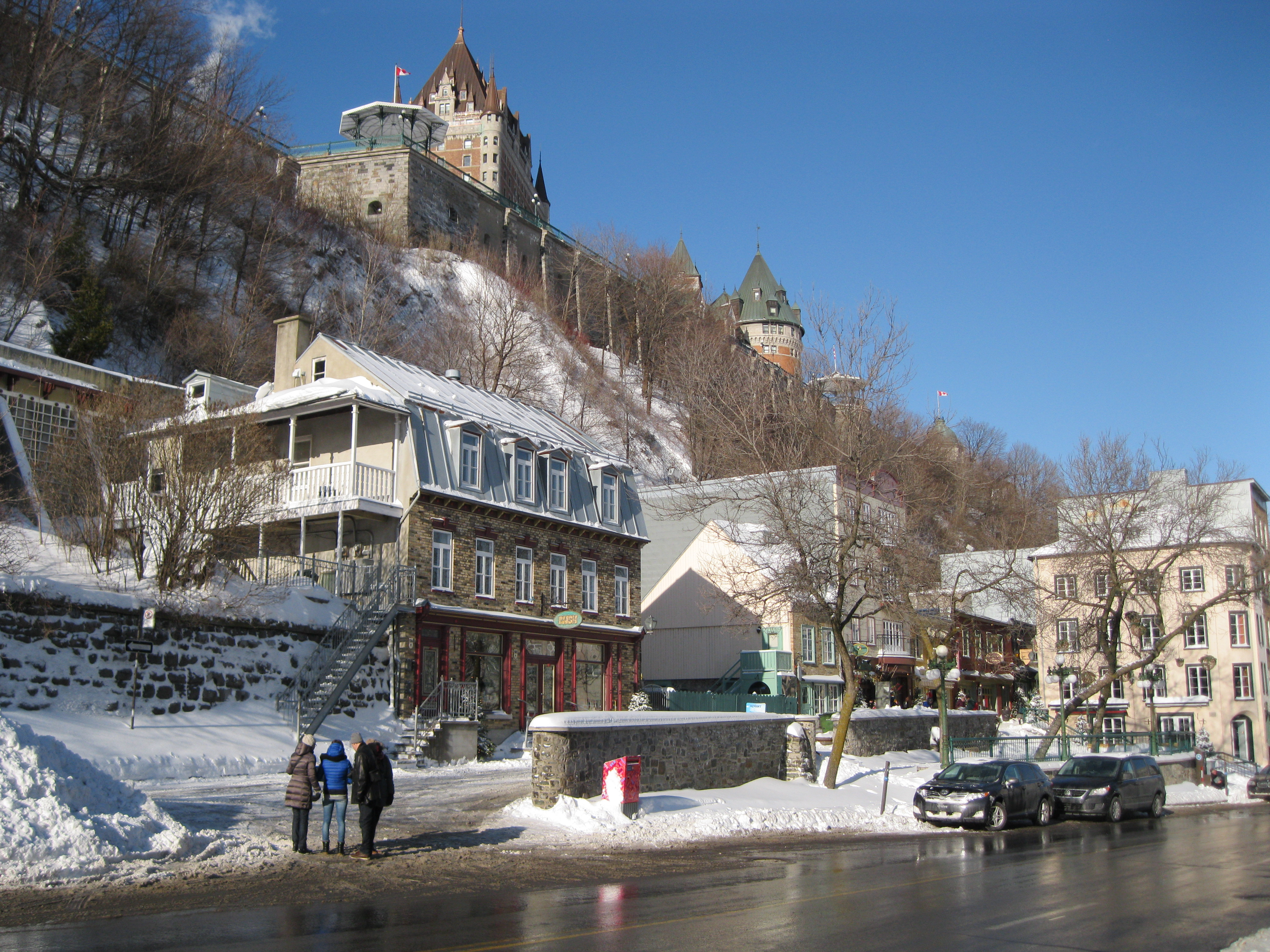
The southern end of the street, at its junction with Boulevard Champlain, with the Château Frontenac above

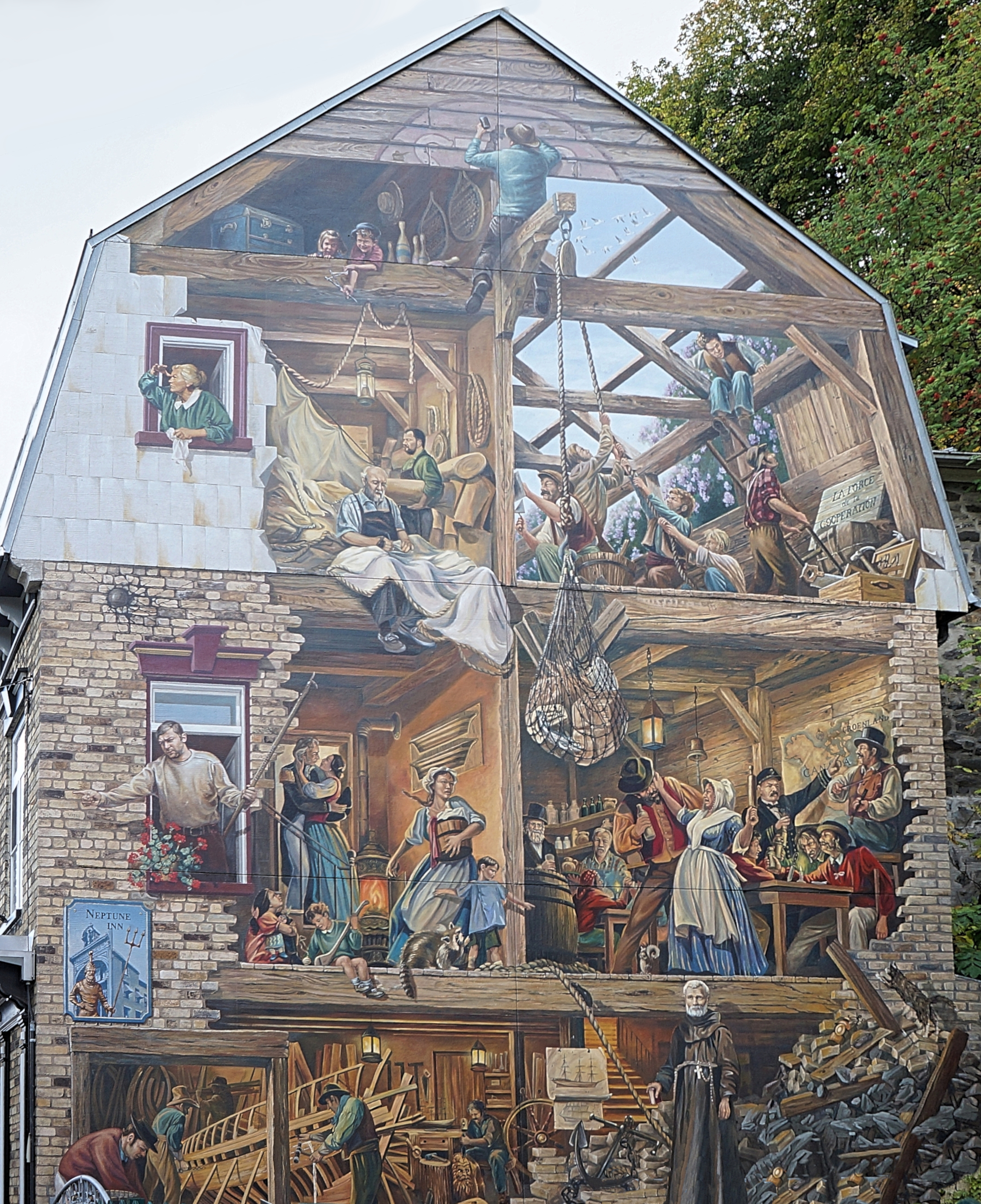
The fresque du Petite-Champlain, on the northern gable end of number 102

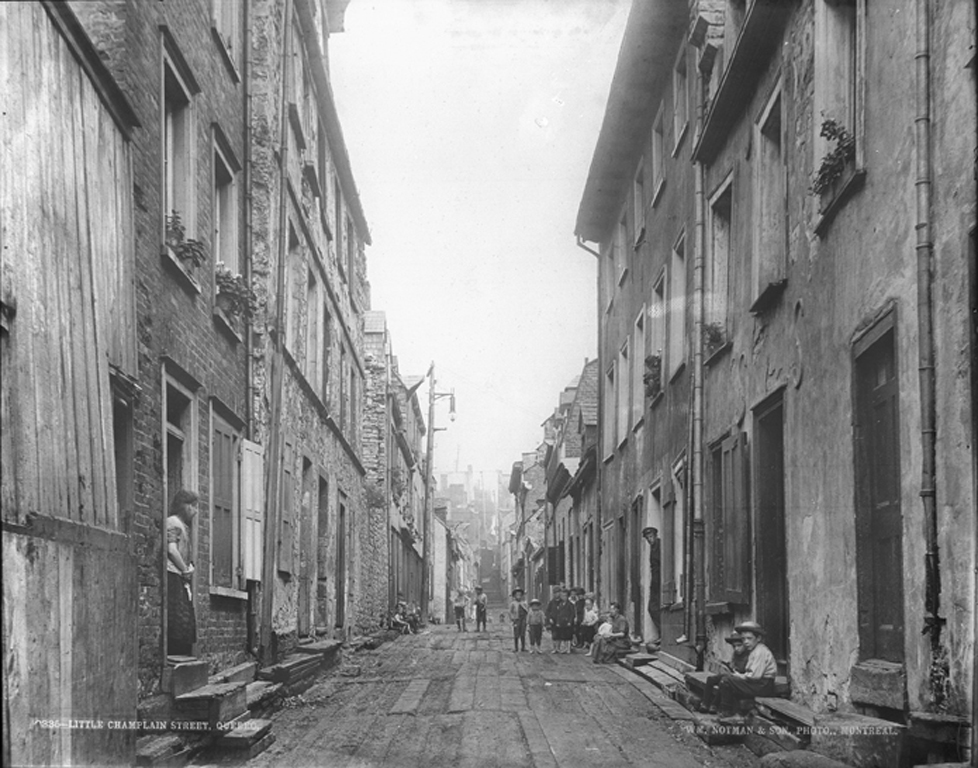
The street around 1890, when it was a boardwalk

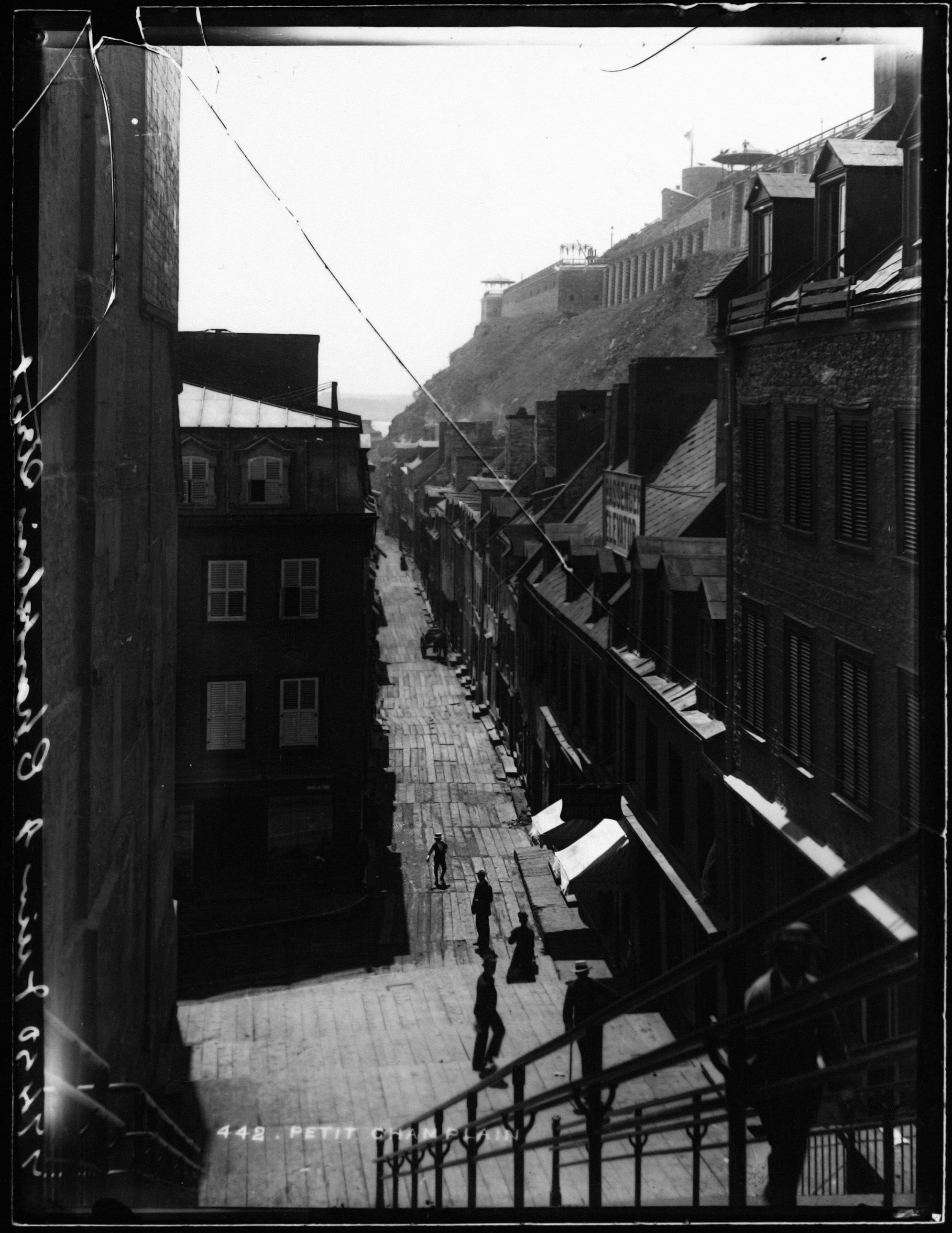
A circa-1900 view of the street
