= Breakneck Stairs =

Stairs in Quebec City, Canada

Breakneck Stairs Escalier casse-cou
- Stairway
- Breakneck Steps
- Former names: escalier Champlain ("Champlain Stairs") escalier du Quêteux ("Beggars' Stairs") escalier de la Basse-Ville ("Lower Town Stairs")
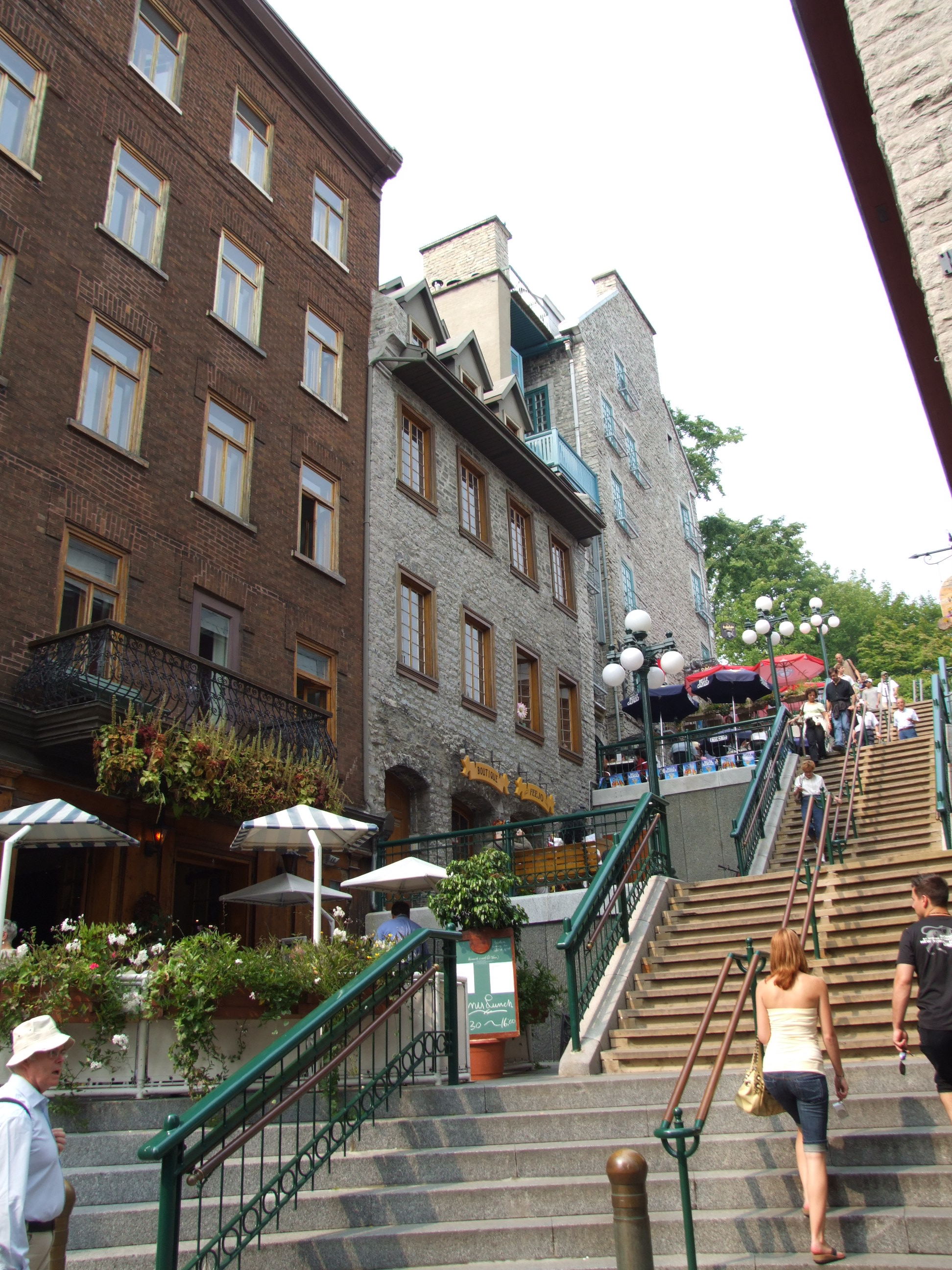
- The steps in 2007, viewed from Rue Sous-le-Fort
- Completed: 1635 (391 years ago)
- Steps: 59
- Location: Quebec City, Quebec, Canada
- Interactive map of Breakneck Stairs
- Coordinates: 46°48′46″N 71°12′13″W

The Breakneck Stairs, or Breakneck Steps (French: Escalier casse-cou), is Quebec City's oldest stairway, built in 1635. Originally called escalier Champlain ("Champlain Stairs"), escalier du Quêteux ("Beggars' Stairs"), or escalier de la Basse-Ville ("Lower Town Stairs"), they were given their current name in the mid-19th century, because of their steepness. The stairs, which connect Côte de la Montagne in the "Upper Town" to the corner of Rue du Petit-Champlain and Rue Sous-le-Fort in the "Lower Town", have been restored several times, including an 1889 renovation by Charles Baillargé which converted the steps from a single flight to four.

Several businesses are located on the western side of the steps at each of its four flights.

== The steps through the years ==
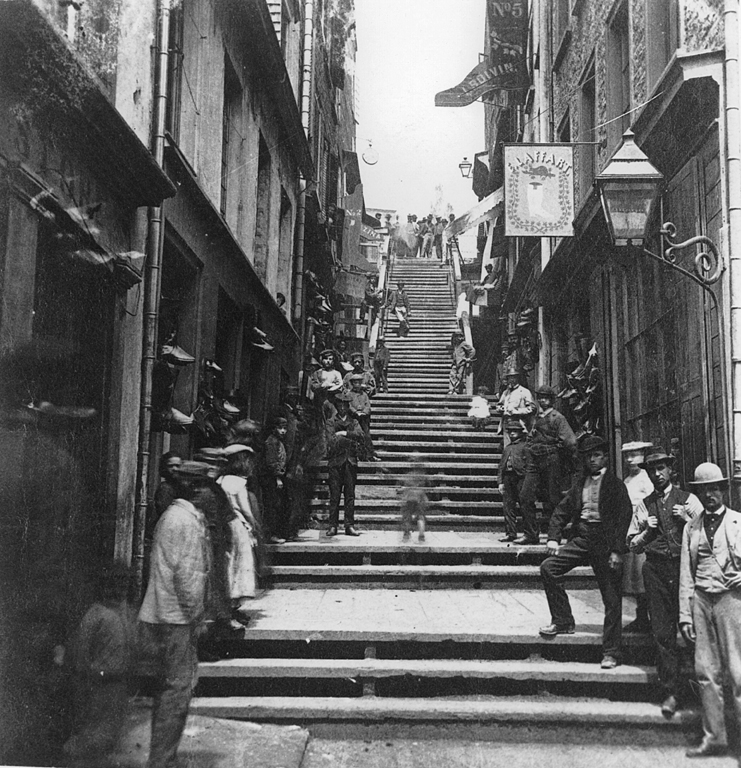
1870

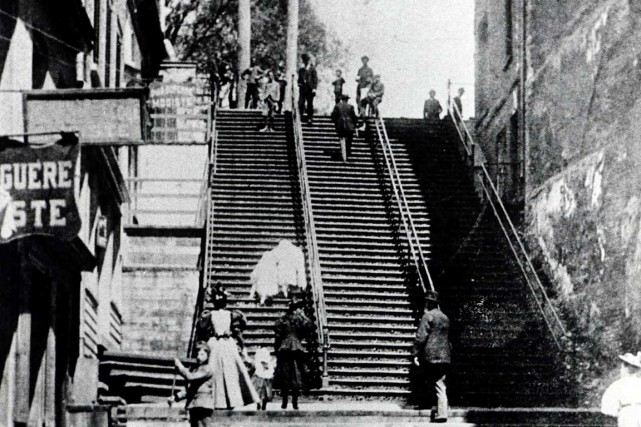
1892

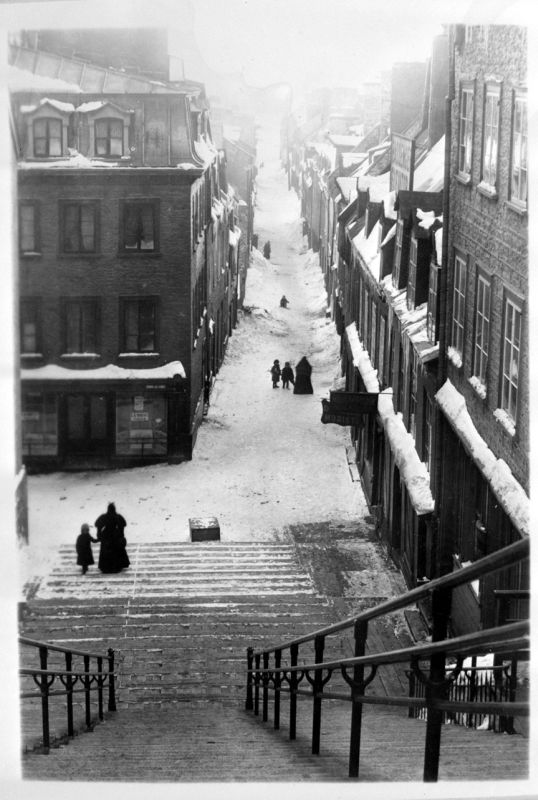
1900

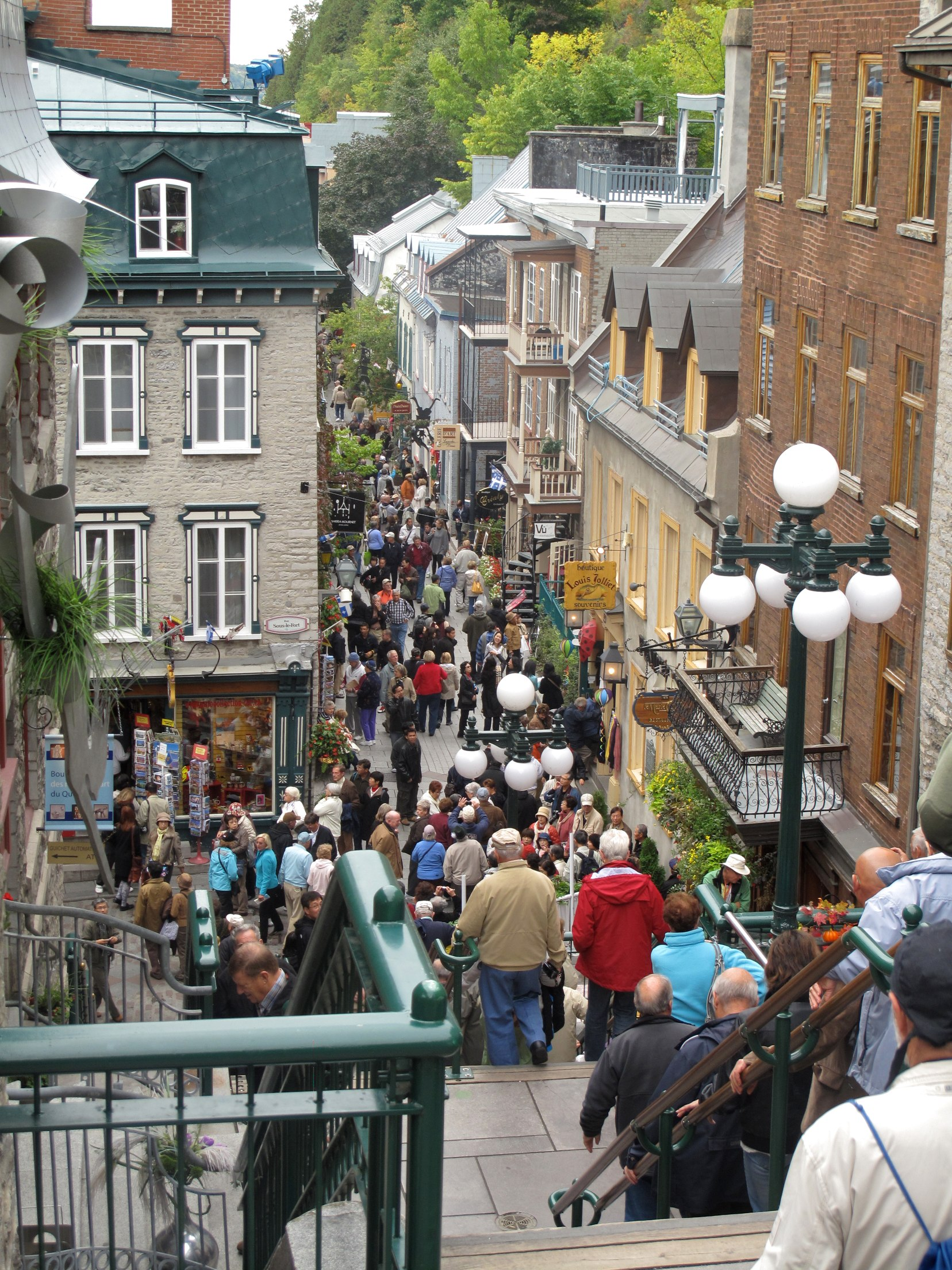
2010
