= Cap Diamant =

Cape in Quebec, Canada

Coordinates: 46°48′33″N 71°12′6″W

Cap Diamant (English: Cape Diamond) is a cape on an edge of the Promontory of Quebec and on which Quebec City is located, formed by the confluence of a bend in the St. Lawrence River to the south and east, and the much smaller Saint-Charles River to the north.

Jacques Cartier, the French explorer who found glittering stones in the high cliff, thought the stones contained diamonds. After he brought samples of these stones to France in 1542, experts concluded that these "diamonds" were actually quartz, hence the proverb "Faux comme un diamant du Canada" ("as fake (or as false) as a Canadian diamond").

In 1759, the troops of British General James Wolfe climbed Cap Diamant toward the Plains of Abraham to conquer Quebec.

In 1889 the Quebec rockslide fell from Cap Diamant.

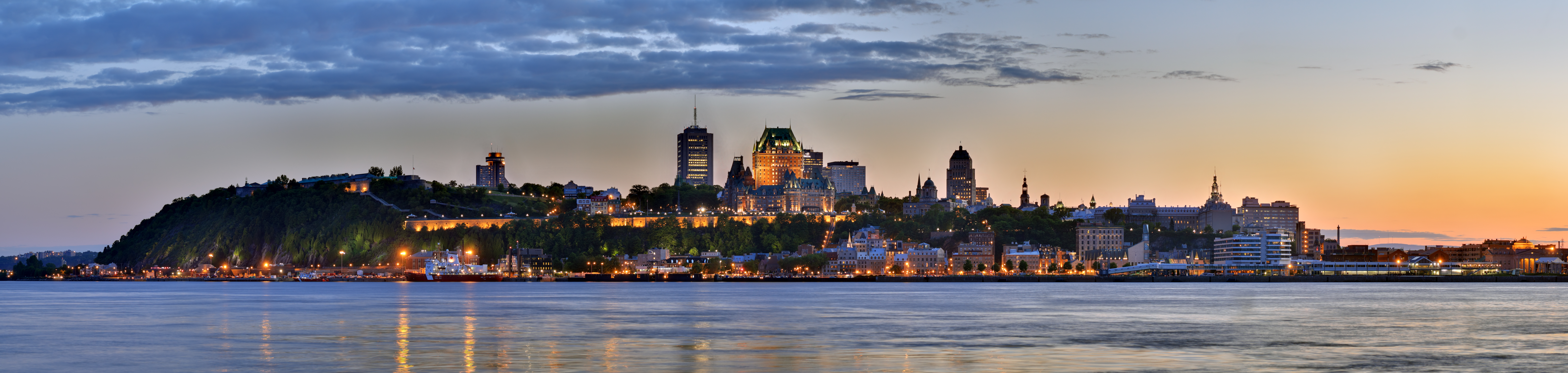
Panorama of Cap Diamant from across the St. Lawrence River

== Popular culture ==
A song entitled "Cap Diamant" was on Canadian singer-songwriter Coeur de Pirate's second CD, Blonde. Cap-aux-Diamants lends its name to a cultural history journal, published in Quebec since 1985.
