= Vieux-Québec–Cap-Blanc–Colline Parlementaire =

Old Quebec - Cape Blanc - Parliament Hill Vieux-Québec–Cap-Blanc–Colline Parlementaire
- Quartier (district)
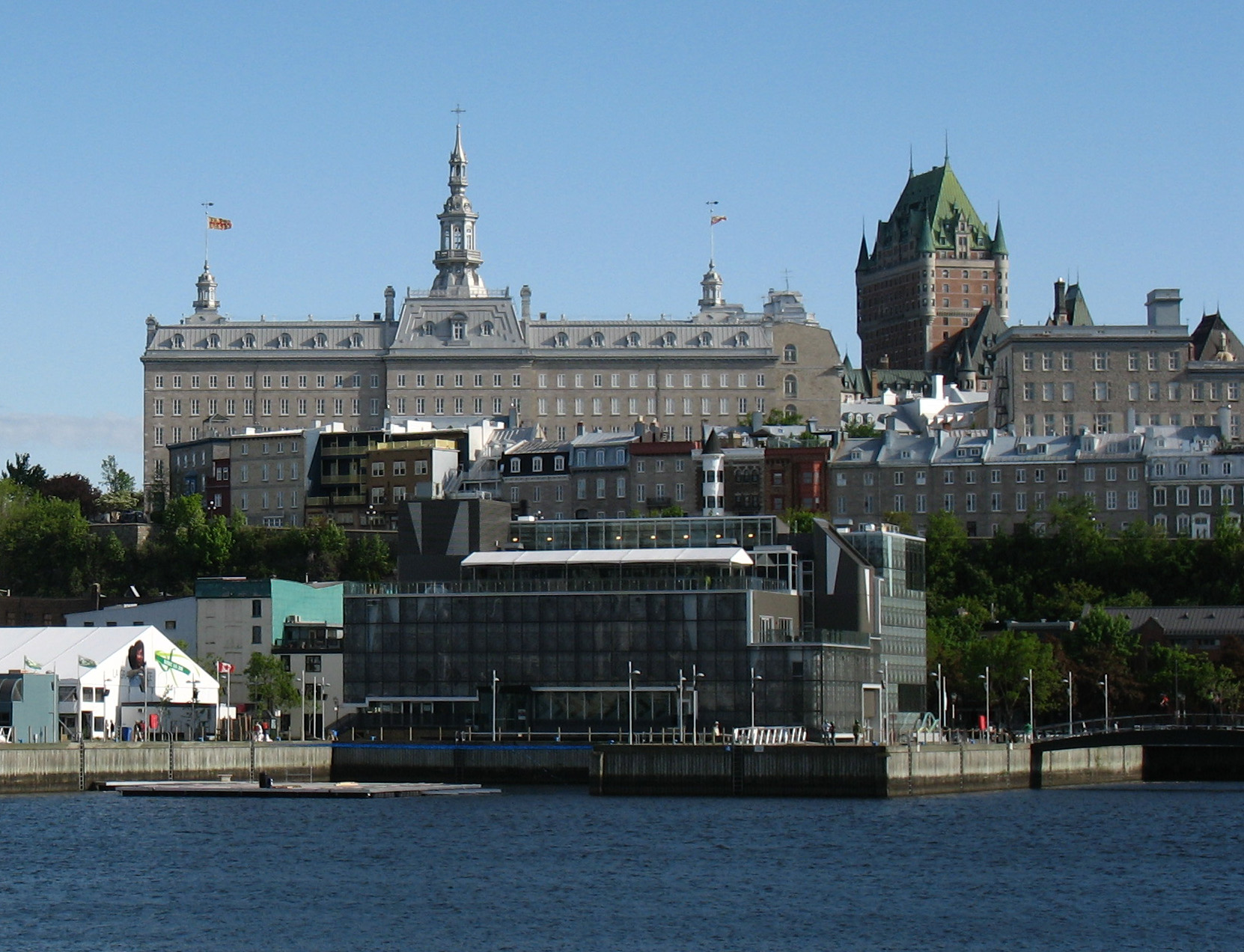
- The district, as seen from the Bassin Louise.

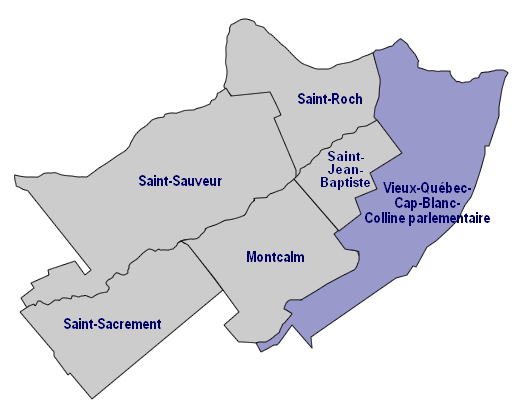
- The district highlighted in blue, within its borough.
- Coordinates: 46°49′N 71°13′W
- Arrondissement (Borough): La Cité-Limoilou
- Ville (City): Québec
- Province: Québec
- Country: Canada
- Merged: 1 November 2009

Government
  - Body: Conseil de quartier (District Council)

Population (2021)
  - Total: 5,925

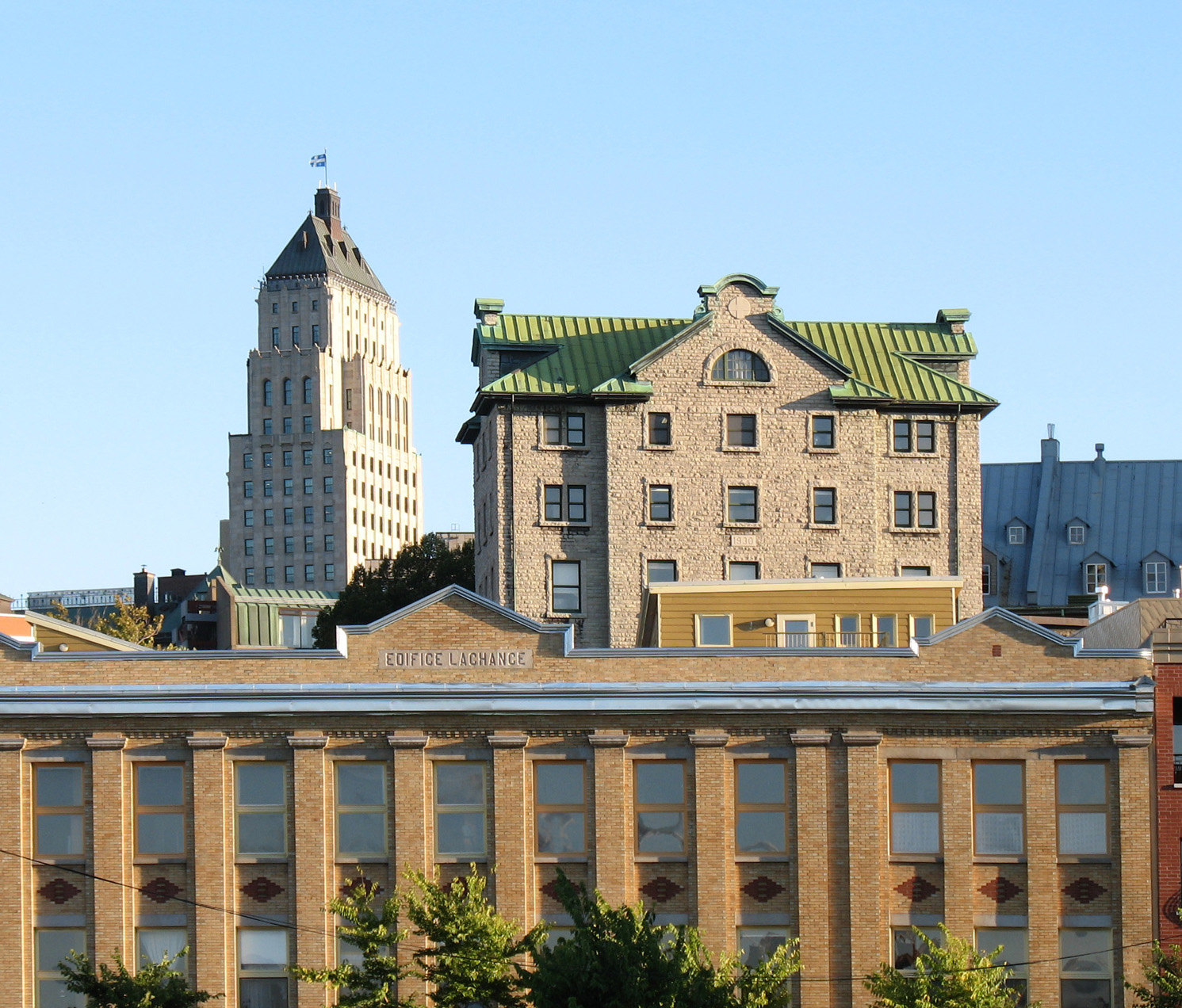
Old Quebec, with the Édifice Price at the top left, in Upper Town.

Vieux-Québec–Cap-Blanc–Colline Parlementaire (French pronunciation: [vjø kebɛk kap blɑ̃ kɔlin paʁləmɑ̃tɛːʁ]) is one of the 35 districts of the City of Quebec, and one of six that are located in the borough of La Cité-Limoilou. The district is the most visited and toured location in the city. It is in this partly fortified area where the Château Frontenac is found, with its large terrace overlooking the city of Lévis, across the Saint Lawrence River. A large concentration of cafes, tourist shops, restaurants, hotels and inns are situated in the district. In its most recent census count in 2016, Statistics Canada reported that the district had a population of 5,770 residents, whom comprise 1.1% of the city's total population.

== Portrait of the neighbourhood ==
The district comprises four distinct areas within the centre of Quebec City:

- Vieux-Québec (Haute-Ville), (Old Quebec (Upper Town)), which includes the space within the old town walls.
- Vieux-Québec (Basse-Ville), (Old Quebec (Lower Town)), including Place Royale, the Old Port and the area around the Gare du Palais.
- Colline Parlementaire, (Parliament Hill), including the area of Place D'Youville and the Parliament Building; the section between Boulevard René-Lévesque and Grande-Allée (up to approximately the Grand Théâtre de Québec); and much of the Plains of Abraham.
- Cap Blanc, a thin strip of land between Cap Diamant and the Saint Lawrence River, and centred on the Church of Notre-Dame-de-la-Garde.

== Main arteries ==
- Rue Saint-Jean
- Rue de Buade
- Rue Saint-Louis and Grande-Allée
- Boulevard Champlain
- Rue Saint-Paul
- Avenue Honoré-Mercier / Autoroute Dufferin-Montmorency (Autoroute 440)

== Parks, green spaces and recreational areas ==
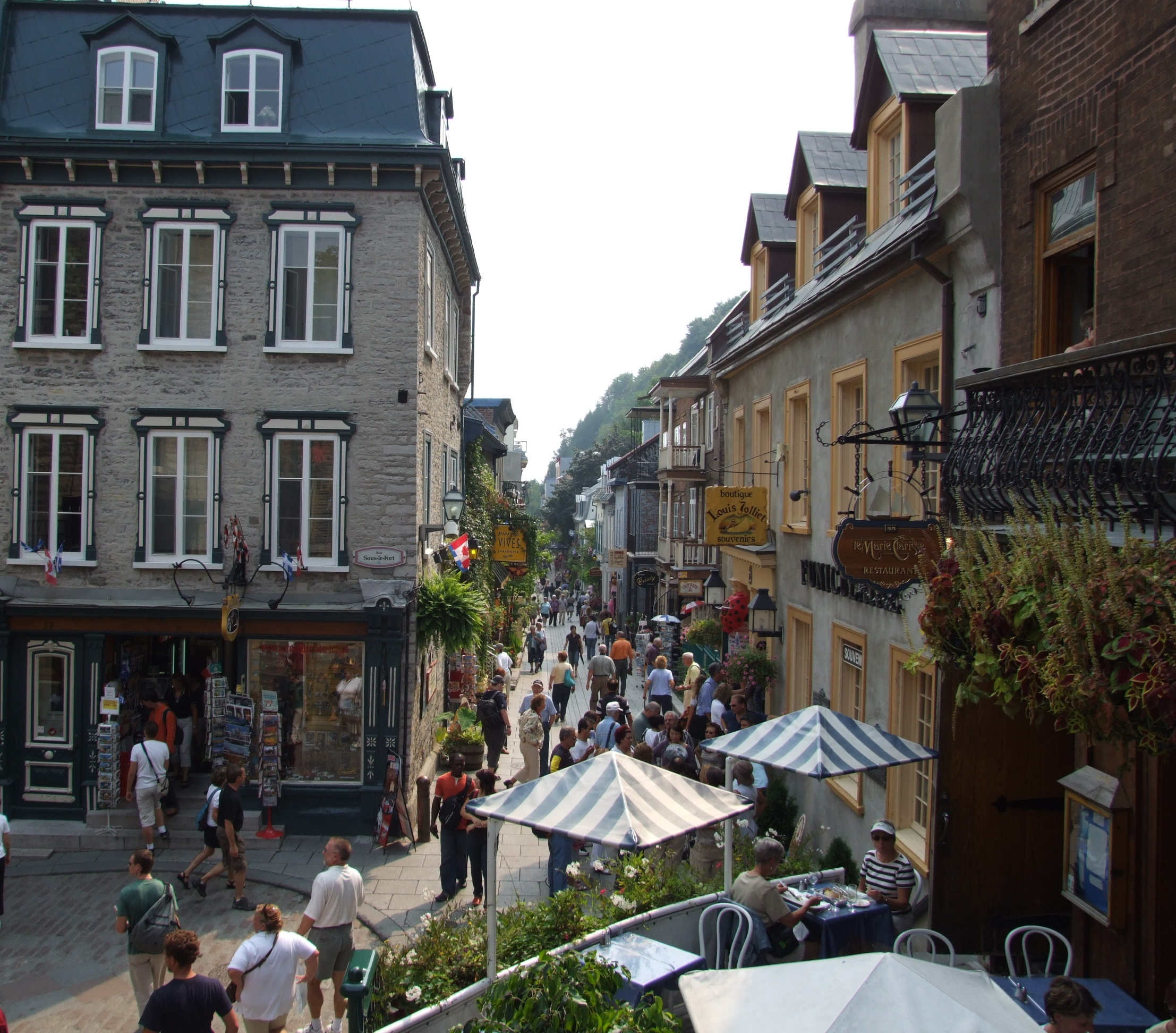
Rue du Petit-Champlain near Place Royale.

- The Battlefields Park / Plains of Abraham
- Artillery Park National Historic Site
- Fortifications of Québec National Historic Site — this site consists of the walls and gates of Quebec, the Governors' Garden, Montmorency Park, Terrasse Dufferin, and the Governors' Walkway.
- Old Port of Quebec
- Place Royale

== Notable buildings ==
- Château Frontenac
- Édifice Price
- Citadelle of Quebec
- Séminaire de Québec
- Hôtel-Dieu de Québec (hospital) and its accompanying church

=== Places of worship ===
- Cathedral-Basilica of Notre-Dame de Québec
- Notre-Dame-des-Victoires Church
- Cathedral of the Holy Trinity
- Chalmers-Wesley United Church
- St. Andrew's Church (Presbyterian)
- St. Patrick's Church (1833) — the first Irish Catholic church to be built in the city. It was abandoned in 1914, burned in 1971, and its façade is now part of an annex to the Hôtel-Dieu de Québec.
- Notre-Dame de la Garde, Cap Blanc

=== Museums, theatres and exhibition spaces ===
- Capitole de Québec (National Historic Site)
- Palais Montcalm
- Musée de la civilisation
- The Institut canadien de Québec building, occupying the old church Wesleyan Church (Methodist, 1849). Includes a performance hall and a branch of the Quebec City Library.

=== Public administration ===
- Parliament Building
- Quebec City Hall
- Édifice Marie-Guyart — the tallest building in Quebec City. The 132 m (433 ft) skyscraper is the tallest building in Canada east of Montreal, and has at its top the Capital Observatory (Observatoire de la Capitale).
- Ministry of Finance of Quebec (in the old Court House)
- Palais de Justice de Québec (court house)
- Headquarters of the Société de l'assurance automobile du Québec
- Headquarters of the Société des traversiers du Québec

=== Places of learning ===
There are no longer any public schools in the district, due to the small number of families with children living there. The few private schools that are there serve clients who live almost exclusively outside the city center.

- Private schools
  - École Saint-Louis de Gonzague
  - Petit Séminaire de Québec
  - École des Ursulines (Old Quebec)
  - CDI College
  - Quebec Oral School for Deaf Children
- School of Architecture at the Université Laval
- Conservatoire de musique et d'art dramatique du Québec

== See also ==
- Quebec City
- Old Quebec
- Plains of Abraham
- Cap Diamant
