= List of tallest buildings in Quebec City =

Skyline of Quebec City
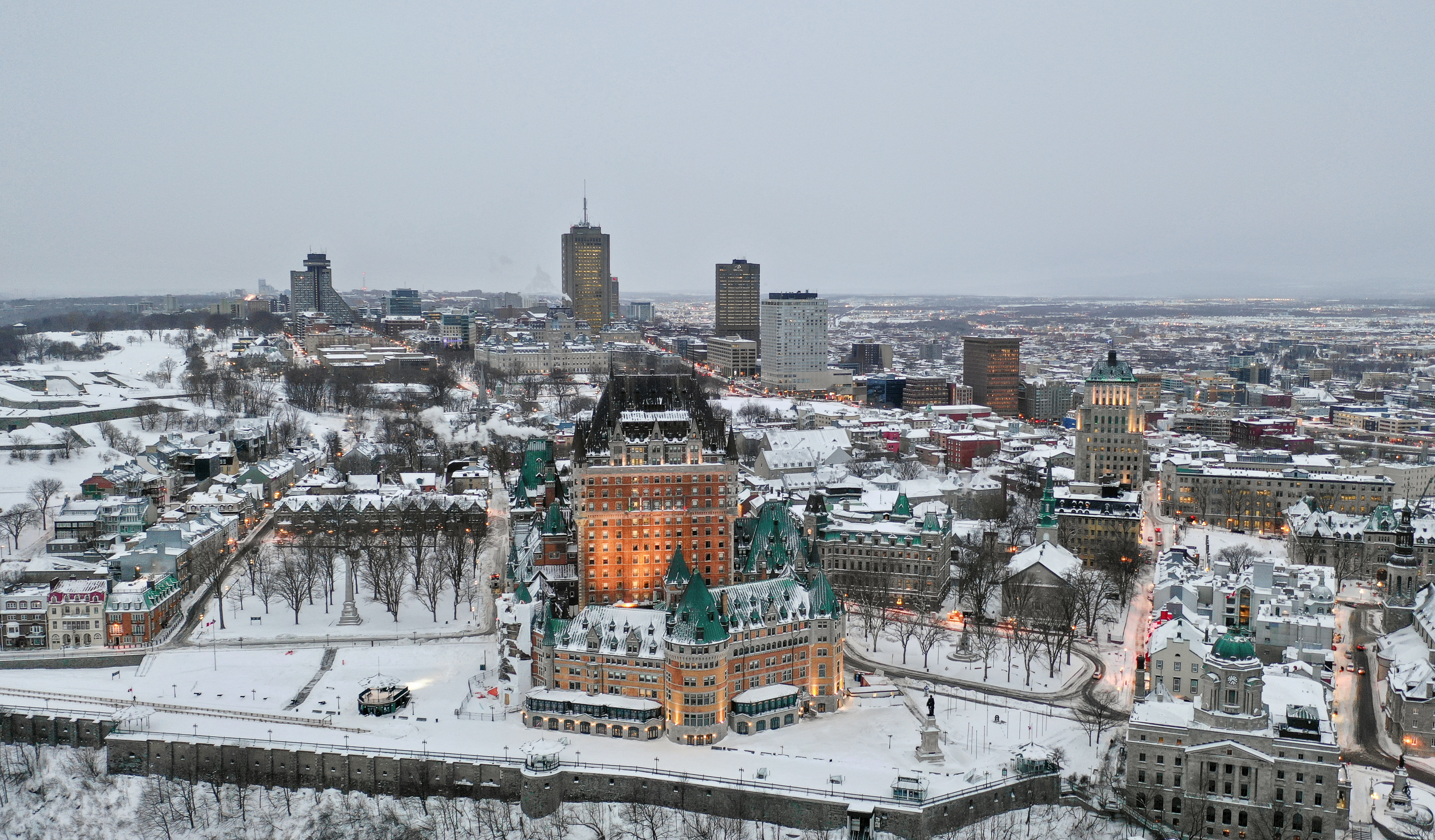
- Skyline of Quebec City, with Château Frontenac in the foreground
- Tallest building: Édifice Marie-Guyart (1972)
- Tallest building height: 132 m (433 ft)

Number of tall buildings
- Taller than 100 m (328 ft): 3

This list of tallest buildings in Quebec City ranks high-rise buildings in the city by height. Quebec City is the capital and second largest city in Quebec, with a population of 531,902. The history of skyscrapers in Quebec City began with the completion of the 82 m (269 ft) tall Édifice Price in 1930. Most of the city's skyscrapers were built between the late 1960s and early 1980s, including the tallest building in the city, the 132 m (433 ft) tall Édifice Marie-Guyart, which was built in 1972.

Château Frontenac was the tallest building in the province of Quebec from the completion of its tallest tower in 1924 to the completion of Montreal's Royal Bank Tower in 1928. In recent years, Quebec City has built a sizeable number of residential high-rises, though significantly less than other cities in Canada. As of June 2025, a 23-storey condo tower named “SWL” is under construction in the neighbourhood of Sainte-Foy.

== History ==
Quebec City's first proper high-rise, the Price Building, was completed in the Old Quebec–Cap-Blanc–Parliament Hill district in 1930. For 40 years, it was then the city's only tall building besides the Château Frontenac. The city underwent densification in the 1970s outside the fortifications of Old Quebec.

The redevelopment of Parliament Hill aimed to provide new office space for the Quebecois government. It was during this period that the Marie-Guyart Building, the city's current tallest building, was built at a height of 132 meters. The majority of new construction, including hotels and private commercial spaces, was built on René-Lévesque Boulevard and Honoré-Mercier Avenue. Buildings from this wave of construction can also be found on Sainte-Foy Road further west. However, ten years later during the 1980s, the rate of construction of new high-rises reduced and has never fully recovered. Starting from the 1990s, the neighboring Saint-Roch neighborhood also experienced some high-rise construction; a twenty-story residential tower, Tour Fresk, was built there in 2016.

Another area with tall buildings is the commercial district of Sainte-Foy. Located at the southwest entrance to the city, at the intersection of the Henri-IV, Duplessis and Robert-Bourassa highways, this is the main commercial area of the Sainte-Foy–Sillery–Cap-Rouge borough. The tall buildings in this area are located along Laurier Boulevard and Route de l'Église. Before 1960, the area was primarily agricultural. High-rise development began with the construction of government buildings in the 1980s.

== Cityscape ==
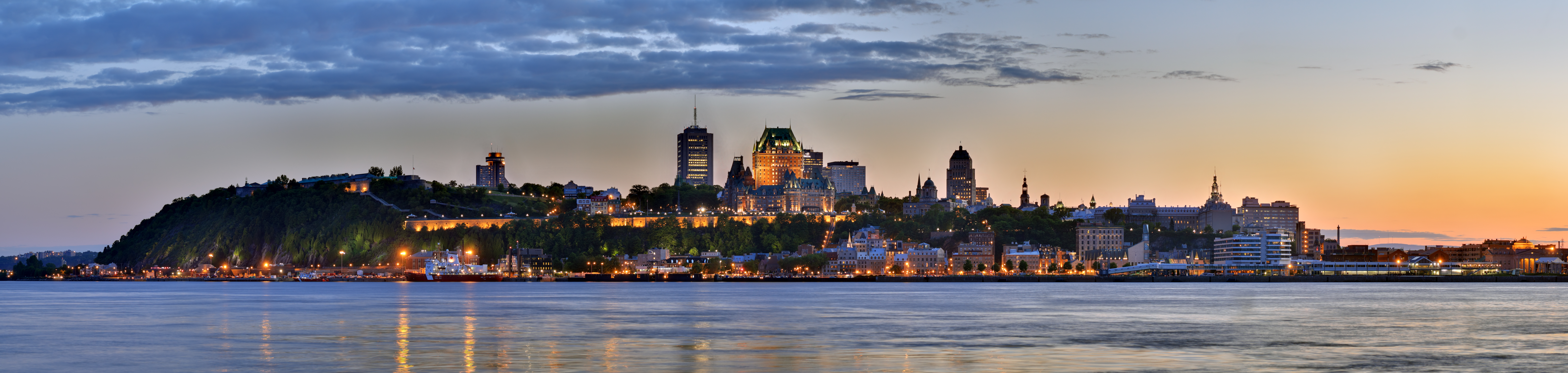
Quebec City Prominent buildings from left to right: The Concorde, Édifice Marie-Guyart, Château Frontenac, Place Hauteville (partly obscured by the Château), Hôtel Hilton Québec, City Hall, Édifice Price and Édifice d'Youville (protruding from behind Édifice Price).

== Tallest buildings ==
This list ranks buildings in Quebec City that stand at least 60 m (197 ft) tall, based on CTBUH height measurement standards. This includes spires and architectural details but does not include antenna masts. An equal sign (=) following a rank indicates the same height between two or more buildings.

Rank	Building	Image	Height m (ft)	Floors	Year	Notes	Ref
1	Édifice Marie-Guyart		132 m (433 ft)	33	1972	The tallest building in Canada east of Montreal. 176.5 m (579 ft) tall with antenna.	
2	Complexe Jules Dallaire II		110 m (360 ft)	28	2013		
3	Place Hauteville		107 m (351 ft)	34	1974		
4	Hôtel Le Concorde		91 m (299 ft)	31	1974		
5	Hôtel Hilton Québec		84 m (276 ft)	28	1974		
6	Édifice Price		82 m (269 ft)	18	1930	This is the first skyscraper built in Quebec City.	
7	Place de la Capitale		80.2 m (263 ft)	21	1974		
8	Le Samuel-Holland I		80 m (262 ft)	24	1981		
9	Château Frontenac		77 m (253 ft)	18	1893		
10	Édifice d'Youville		76 m (249 ft)	21	1969		
11	Complexe Jules-Dallaire I		75.5 m (248 ft)	17	2010		

== Other important buildings ==
=== Quebec Parliament Building ===
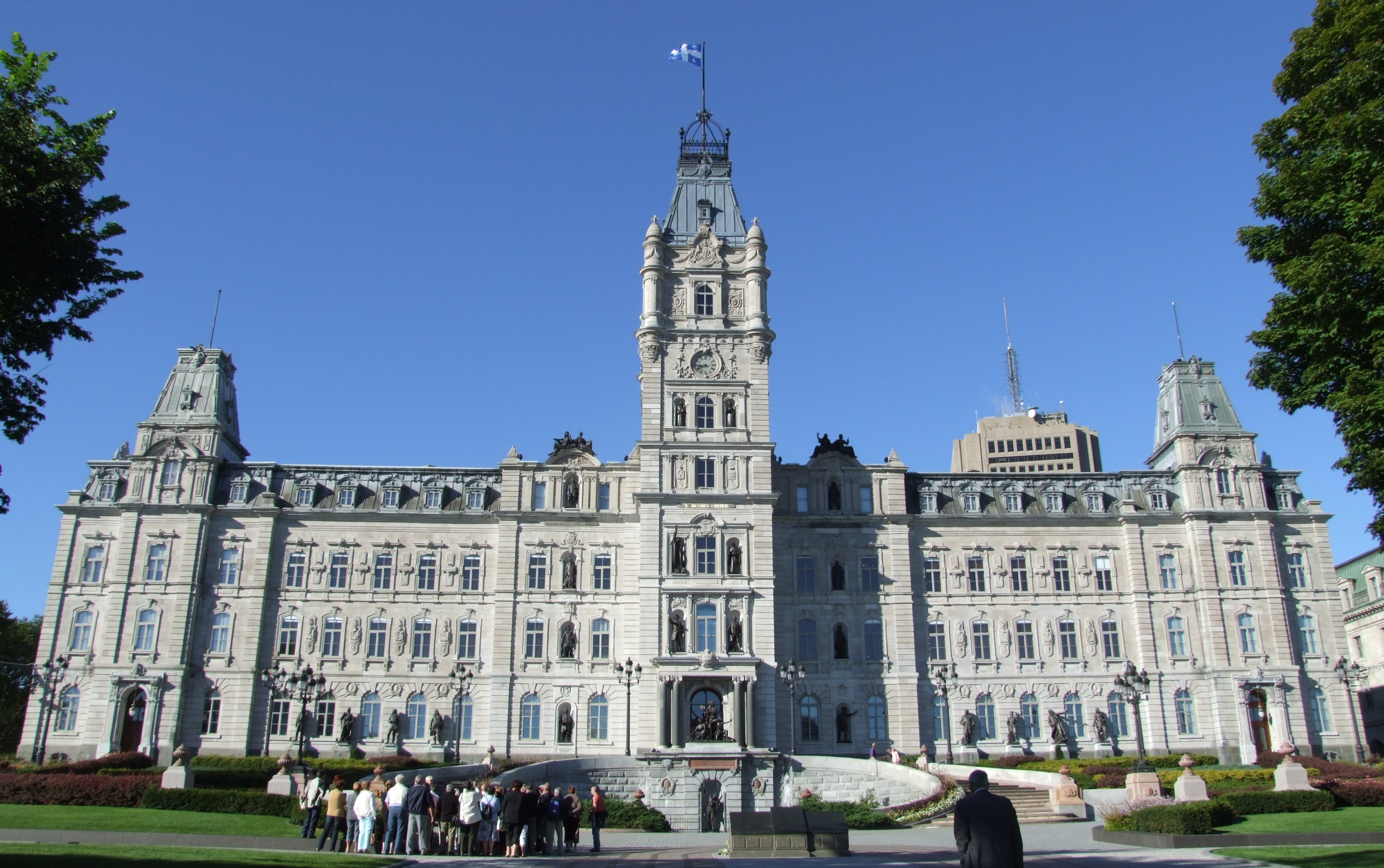

The Parliament Building (French: Hôtel du Parlement) is an eight-floor building and home to the Parliament of Quebec (composed of the Lieutenant-Governor and the National Assembly) in Quebec City. The building was designed by architect Eugène-Étienne Taché and was built from 1877 to 1886. With the frontal tower, the building stands at 52 metres or 171 feet in height.

It features the Second Empire architectural style that was popular for prestigious buildings both in Europe (especially France where the style originated) and the United States during the latter 19th century. Although somewhat more sober in appearance and lacking a towering central belfry, Quebec City's Parliament Building bears a definite likeness to the Philadelphia City Hall, another Second Empire edifice in North America which was built during the same period. Even though the building's symmetrical layout with a frontal clock tower in the middle is typical of legislative institutions of British heritage, the architectural style is believed to be unique among parliament buildings found in other Canadian provincial capitals. Its facade presents a pantheon representing significant events and people of the history of Quebec.

=== Palace Station ===
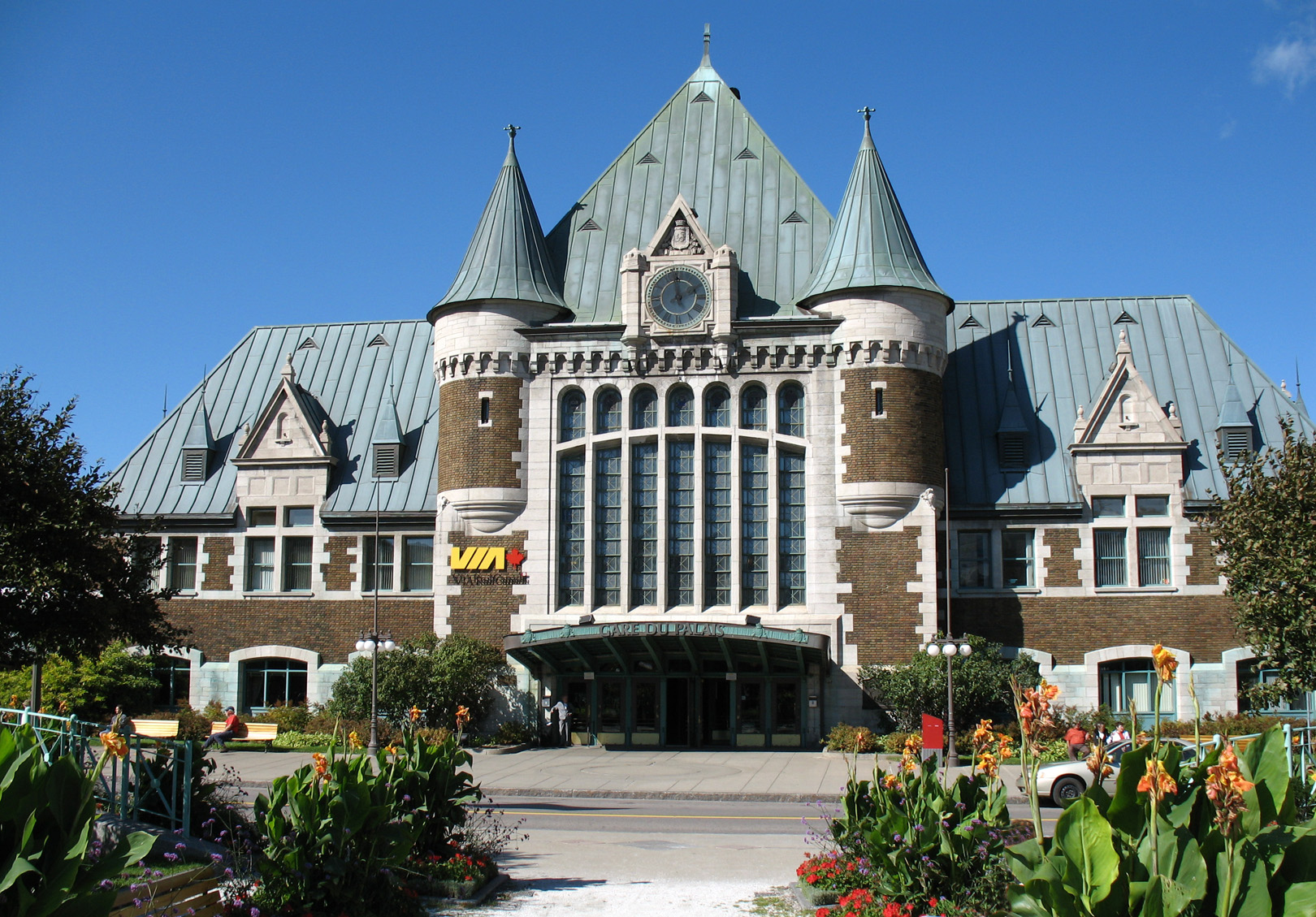

Gare du Palais (‘Palace Station’) is a train and bus station in Quebec City. Its name comes from its proximity to the Palace of the Intendant of New France. It is served by Via Rail, Canada’s national passenger railway, and by the private coach company Orléans Express.

Built in 1915 by the Canadian Pacific Railway, the two-storey châteauesque station is similar in design to the Château Frontenac. The station had no passenger rail service from 1976 to 1985, although it once again hosts regular daily services west to Montreal's Central Station via Drummondville. It was designated a Heritage Railway Station in 1992.

== Timeline of tallest buildings ==
History of the tallest buildings in Quebec City
Period	Building	Height	Floors	Image
1886-1924	Parliament Building; Government	52.1 m (171 ft)	4	
1924-1930	Château Frontenac; Hotel	79.9 m (262 ft)	18	
1930-1972	Édifice Price; Mixed use	82 m (269 ft)	18	
1972–Present	Édifice Marie-Guyart; Office	132 m (433 ft)	33	

== See also ==
- List of tallest buildings in Quebec
