= Clarendon Hotel =

Hotel in Quebec, Canada

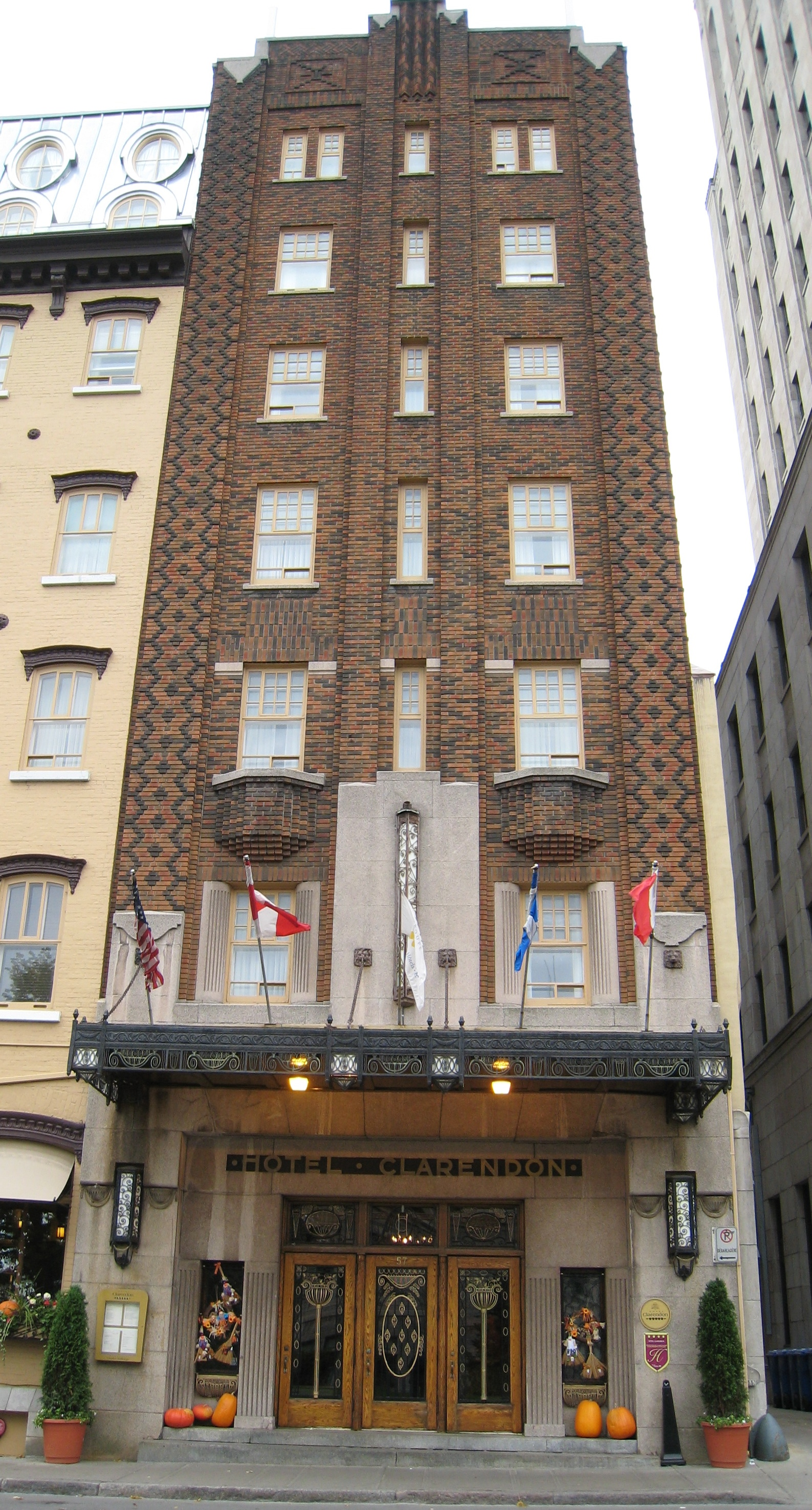
- The Clarendon's entrance and extension
- Interactive map of the Clarendon Hotel area

General information
- Location: 57, rue Sainte-Anne; Quebec City, Quebec; G1R 3X4
- Coordinates: 46.813°N 71.2076°W
- Completed: 1858
- Opened: 1870

Technical details
- Floor count: 7

Design and construction
- Architect: Charles Baillairgé

Other information
- Number of rooms: 143

Website
- Official website

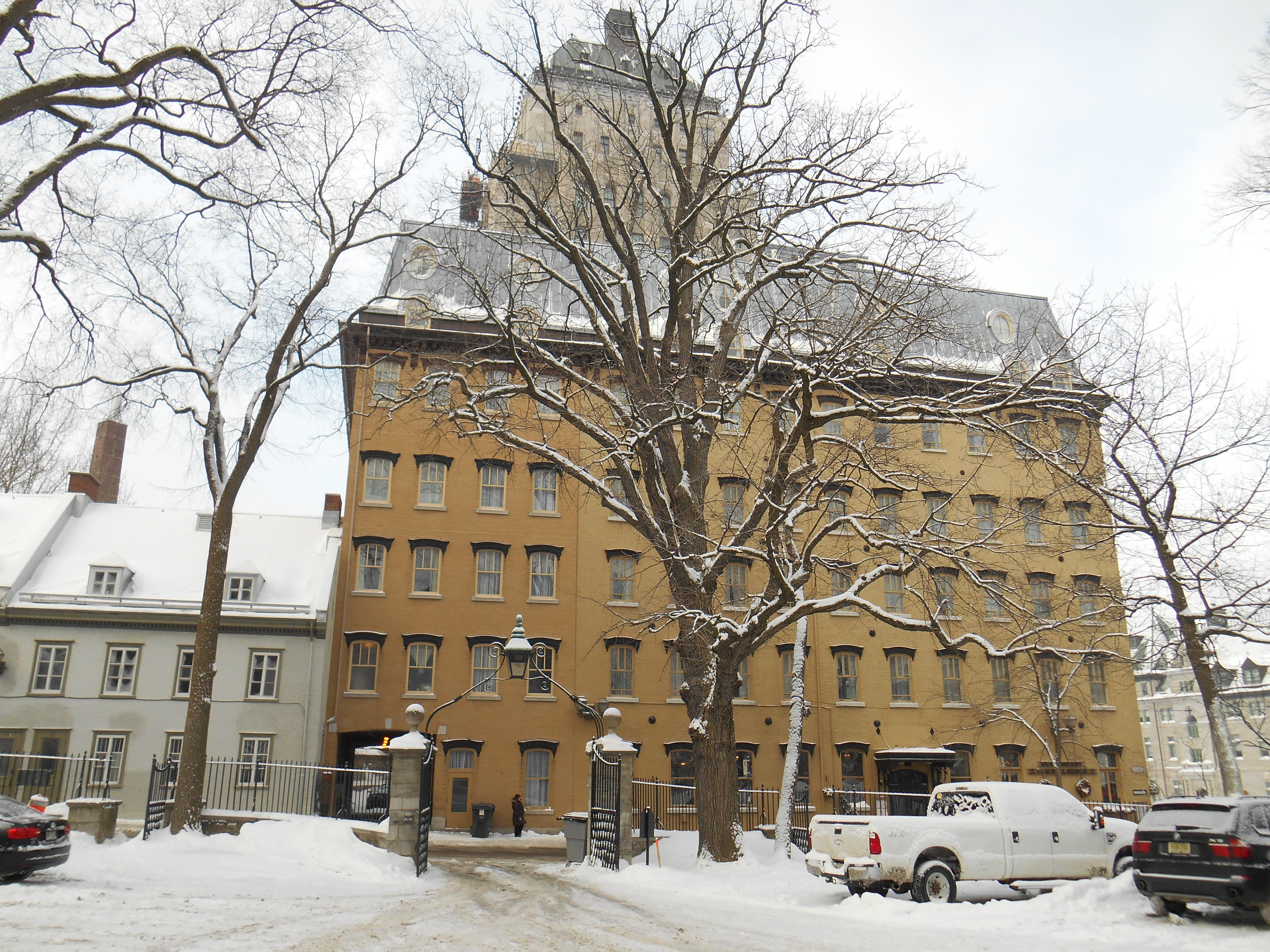
Clarendon House as seen from the steps of Holy Trinity Anglican Cathedral, across Rue des Jardins

The Clarendon Hotel, or Clarendon House (French: Hôtel Clarendon), is a high-end hotel in the historic neighbourhood of Old Quebec in Quebec City, Quebec, Canada. It is the oldest continuously operating hotel in the city.

The original building, on the corner of Rue Sainte-Anne and des Jardins, was a house built in 1858 and designed by Charles Baillairgé. It was built as a four-storey house, and was almost immediately sold to Queen's Printers George-Édouard Desbarats and Stewart Derbishire. The building hosted the printers (and various smaller businesses) until 1870, when it became the Russel House hotel, which was sold in 1894, and renamed the Clarendon Hotel. The hotel changed hands again several times until it became part of the Dufour Group hotels.

Important extensions and modifications were made to the building during the 20th century: two extra floors with mansard roof and a six-floor Art Deco extension at 57 Rue Sainte-Anne where the main entrance, originally on des Jardins, was relocated. Soon after, another extension was built to enlarge the hotel. The hotel boasts a fine French restaurant, Le Charles Baillairgé, and a bar, L'Emprise, were renowned live jazz shows used to be held until 2006.

The main architectural interest of the building is its brick Art Deco façade, completed in 1927 and designed by Raoul Chênevert. It also has Art Nouveau cast iron grilles and canopy, giving it a unique combination of styles. Built a few years before neighbouring Édifice Price, its decoration is more geometric than figurative. The building still keeps its wicket entrance.

The hotel serves as a backdrop to Nicole Brossard's novel Yesterday, at the Hotel Clarendon (French: Hier).
