= Price Building =

Skyscraper in Quebec City, Canada

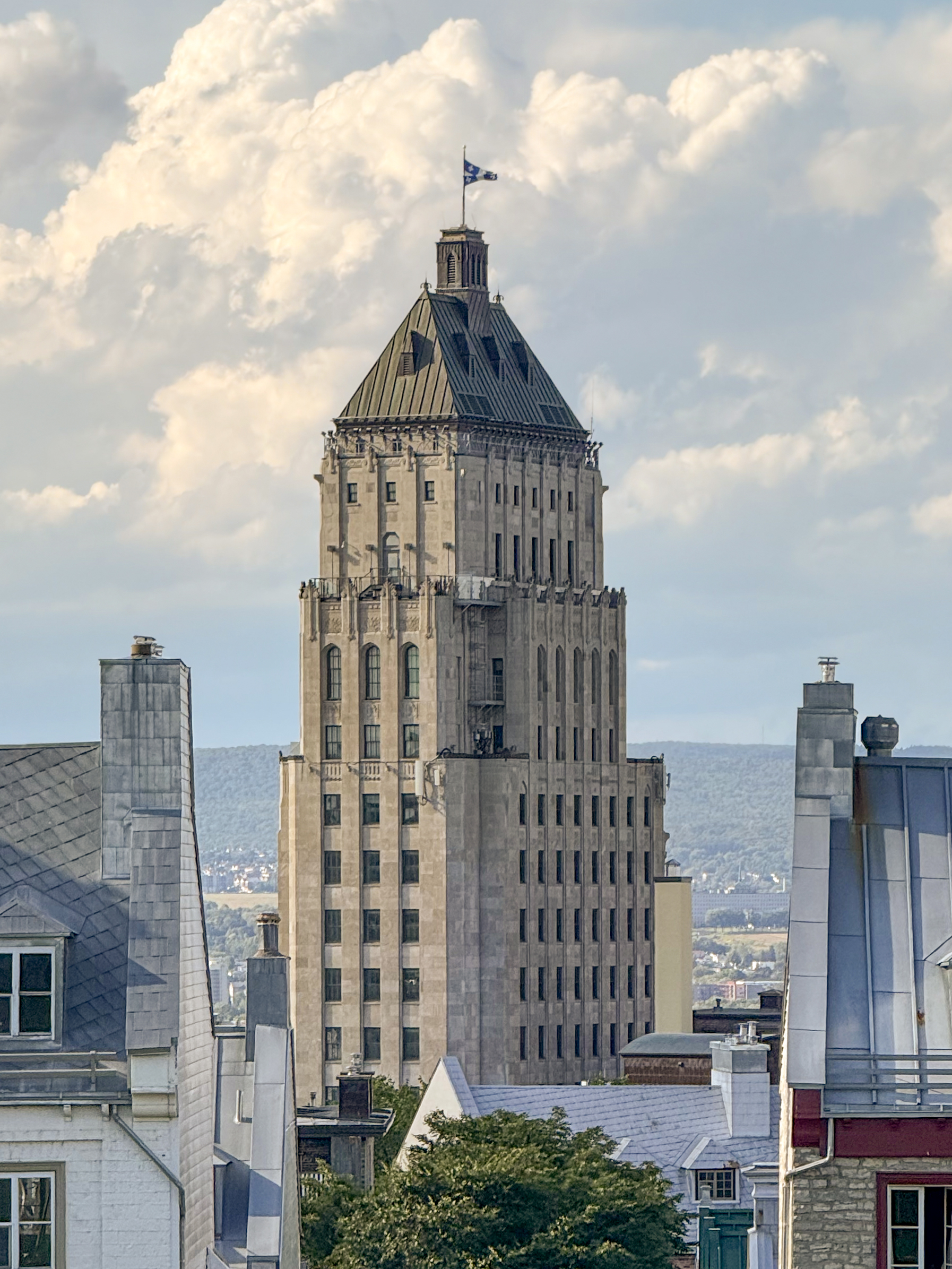
- Price Building in 2025

General information
- Type: Municipal and corporate offices, official residence of the Premier of Quebec
- Architectural style: Art Deco
- Location: 65, Rue Sainte-Anne; Quebec City, Quebec; G1R 3X5
- Coordinates: 46°48′47.1″N 71°12′29.3″W
- Construction started: 1928
- Completed: 1930
- Opening: 1931
- Cost: CA$1 million
- Owner: Ivanhoé Cambridge

Height
- Roof: 82 m (269 ft)

Technical details
- Floor count: 18 (see text)

Design and construction
- Architect: Ross and Macdonald

The Price Building (French: Édifice Price) is an 18-floor (originally 16) skyscraper in Quebec City, Quebec, Canada. Built in 1928–1930 amid controversy for Price Brothers Limited, it is the tallest building in the Old Quebec historical district, as well as one of the oldest skyscrapers in Canada. The building is the property of Ivanhoé Cambridge, a subsidiary of the Caisse de dépôt et placement du Québec. A memorial is attached to the building. In 2001, it became the location of an official residence for the Premier of Quebec, which occupies two of the upper floors.

== History ==
In 1927, John Herbert and Arthur Clifford Price, having inherited the prosperous Price Brothers Limited after the 1924 death of their father, Sir William Price III, decided to build a new headquarters for the company in Quebec City. They did not find anything to their liking on Saint-Pierre street, at the time Quebec's main financial district, so they decided on Saint-Anne street close to the City Hall. The design for the initially 16–floor building was awarded to Ross and Macdonald, a prestigious firm of architects based in Montreal.

The city, eager to demonstrate a progressive ethos, gave assent to the project despite heavy criticism that the administration was proving unable to protect Québec′s historic area, as the building was slated to replace two historic houses. Sources conflict as to exactly when construction started: one cites June 1929 to May 1930; while another states the construction permit was delivered in December 1929 and construction began in June 1930; and a third gives only years: 1928–1930. The building's cornerstone bears an inscription which reads "This stone was laid Oct. XXIX MCMXXIX [October 29, 1929]". However, all sources agree that construction was rapid, and the building was finished within a year. It was inaugurated in 1931.

Although completed successfully, the building turned out to be little more than an extravagant nail in Price Brothers' coffin. The Great Depression pushed the company to the brink of bankruptcy, and the Price Family lost both control of the company and most of its fortune. Various restoration work was undertaken during the 1950s and '60s, mostly to the interior of the building.

In 1983, it was acquired by the city of Quebec, which largely used it for its civil engineering division, echoing a similar situation in New York City, where the Manhattan Municipal Building's offices are extensions of those at New York City Hall. Soon afterwards, a longterm lease placed the Price Building under the management of the Société immobilière Trans-Québec (SITQ, now Ivanhoé Cambridge), the real estate arm of the Caisse de dépôt et placement du Québec (CDP). Further extensive renovation began that lasted until 2005, and included the addition of two extra floors on the inside, a terrace on the 16th floor and the installation of elevators.

In 2001, the 16th and 17th floors became the Premier of Quebec′s official residence. Between 1997 and 2002, a high-end psychiatric clinic occupied floors 2 and 3 of the building. The administration has strongly affirmed the timing of this move with the Premier′s installation to be a complete coincidence. On 12 July 2009, tightrope walker Ramon Kelvink Jr. walked 230 metres (755 ft) from the 13th floor of the building to the Château Frontenac′s 15th floor as part of the celebrations of the 400th anniversary of Quebec City.

The construction of the Price Building was heavily criticized in the 1920s, both because it showed disrespect for Price Sr.′s intention of relocating the Price Brothers company′s operations to its original business centre of Kénogami (now Jonquière), and because the monumental construction was perceived as out of proportion in a mixed commercial and residential area where few buildings exceeded four or five floors. Criticism continued after the construction, and a few years later the city council passed a by-law limiting building heights in the old town to 65 feet (19.8 m) — a size only exceeded by one other building at the time: the then seven-floor Hôtel-Dieu de Québec. Nowadays, however, the building is considered an architectural monument in the capital and a defining element of the city's skyline.

When the proposal of the Phare de Québec major skyscraper project in the Sainte-Foy area began attracting criticism, parallels with the major controversies that surrounded the Price Building′s construction were drawn.

== Architecture ==
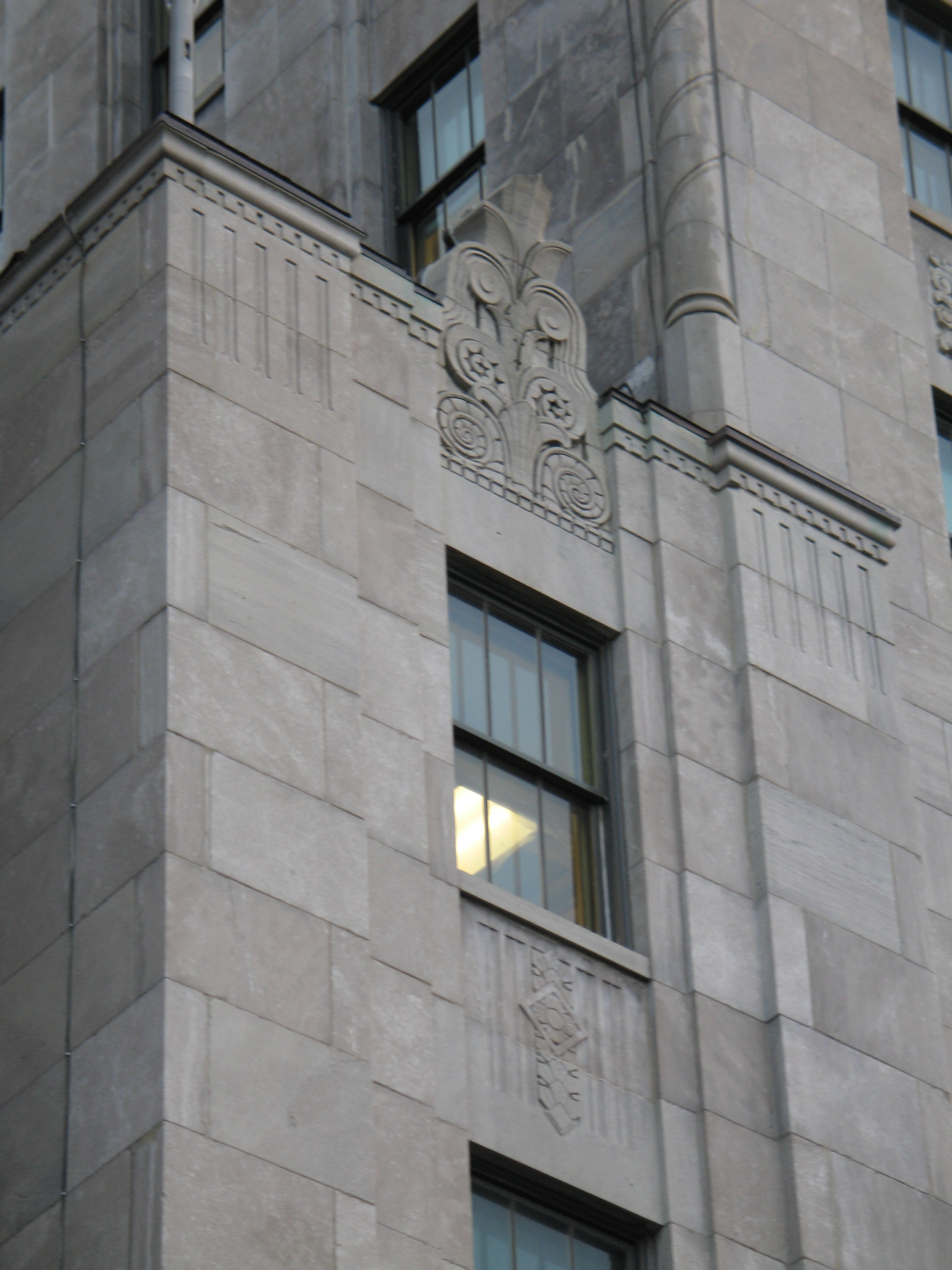
Details of the façade

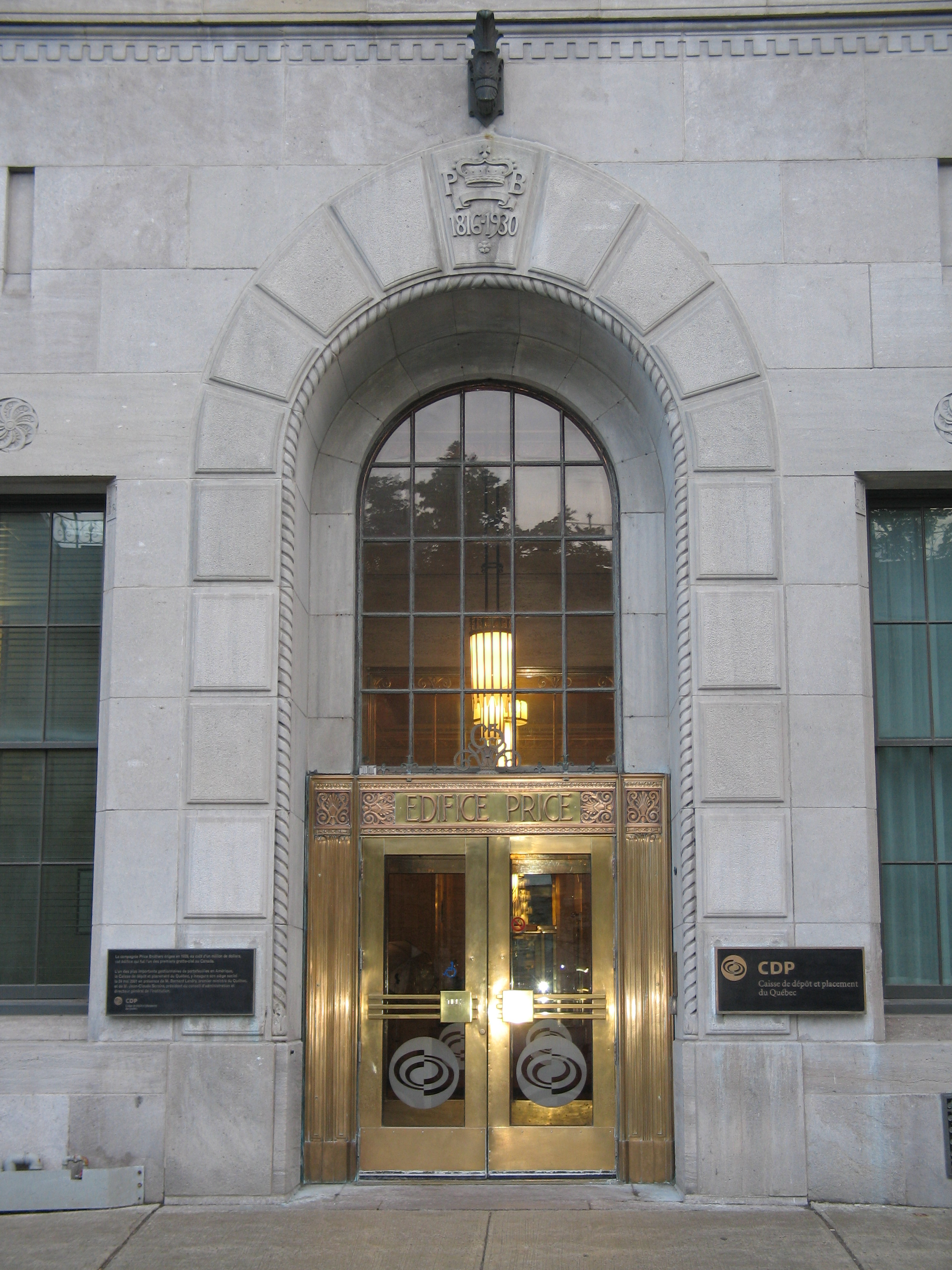
Building entrance

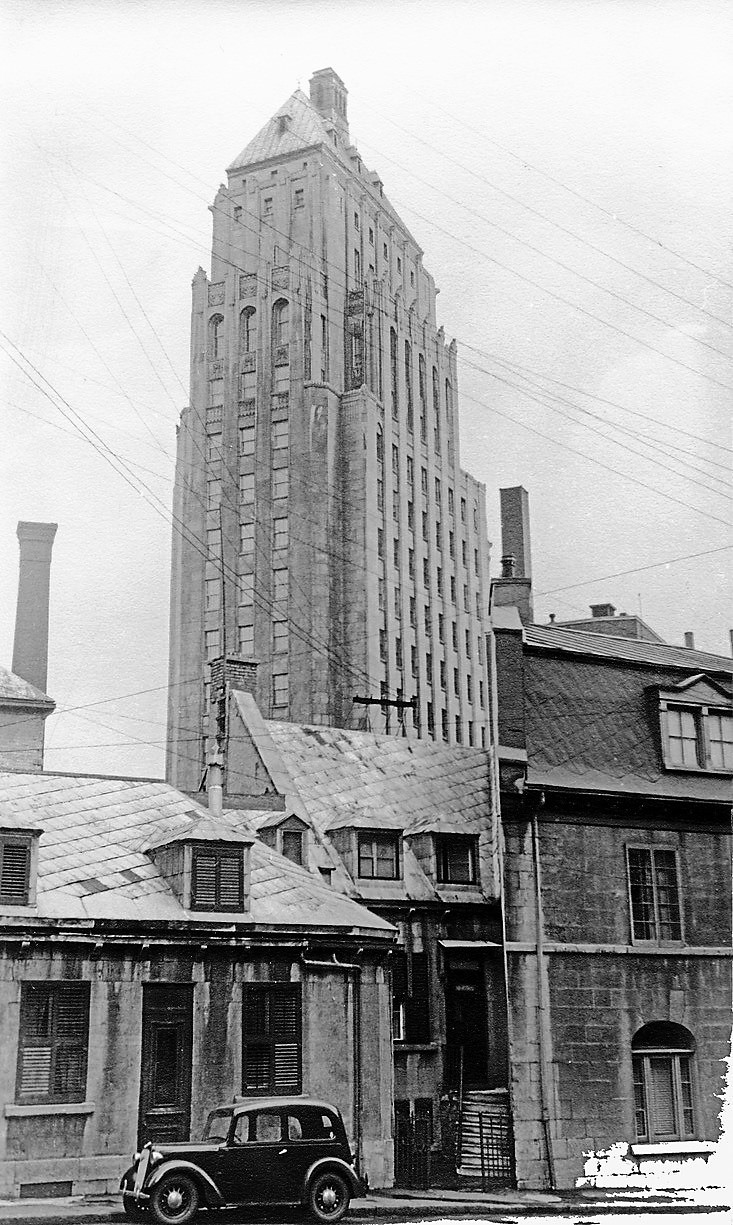
Price Building in 1948, with a Standard GT car in the foreground.

The Price Building, despite the original criticism, is considered to be very well integrated with its surroundings, and well adapted to a lot only 24 metres (79 ft) wide. Of its 18 floors, 15 are used as corporate space, two constitute the Premier′s suite, and on top is a mechanical floor. This leads to conflicting numbers quoted for its floors (16, 17 and 18 have been variously reported), compounded by the fact the retrofitted extra floors are not visible from outside the building. Two elevators, one of which is used as a freight elevator, provide access to all floors.

The Price Building was constructed in the art deco style of the time, as was the neighbouring Clarendon Hotel, whose extension was completed a few years earlier. The design uses setbacks to gradually taper floor area down, yielding the typical elongated "wedding cake" shape which contributes in reducing loads and softens the building's visual impact on the city's skyline. The upper setbacks were later used to build balconies. Because the building is deeper than it is wide, it appears much bulkier when viewed from the side. This is reminiscent of Finnish Art Nouveau architect Eliel Saarinen′s work, and is the stylistic opposite of other buildings in the city such as the Château Frontenac, whose cantilever construction widens as it gets taller. Geometric motifs are carved in the Price Building′s stone cladding, especially over the first few levels. The building is topped by a more classical, specifically Châteauesque, steepled copper roof. The final composition displays Beaux-Arts influences. The main exterior′s decorative themes are pilasters topped with palm motifs, pinnacles, and a large vaulted arch with extrados over the main entrance.

At ground level and inside the lobby, bas-reliefs depict the origins of the Price company. During the 1920s John M. Lyle, an influential architect of the Beaux-arts school, was developing a uniquely Canadian fusion of French and English colonial styles, and his ideas were applied by designers Ross and Macdonald to the construction of the Price Building. Each floor is symmetrically divided in two by a hallway, and a projection at the end of the building references the bow of a ship.

The building's structural steel frame was also a first for the city. It was covered in grey limestone from Saint-Marc-des-Carrières and Queenston. Due to the rapid construction, Saint-Marc-des-Carrières was unable to supply enough stone to keep up with demand on the building site, resulting in the use of Queenston as an additional source. Saint-Marc-des-Carrières limestone is a pearly grey, and becomes a pale beige with age, while Queenston limestone has pink calcite streaks from crinoid fossils and takes a chamois tint as it ages.

== Price Memorial ==
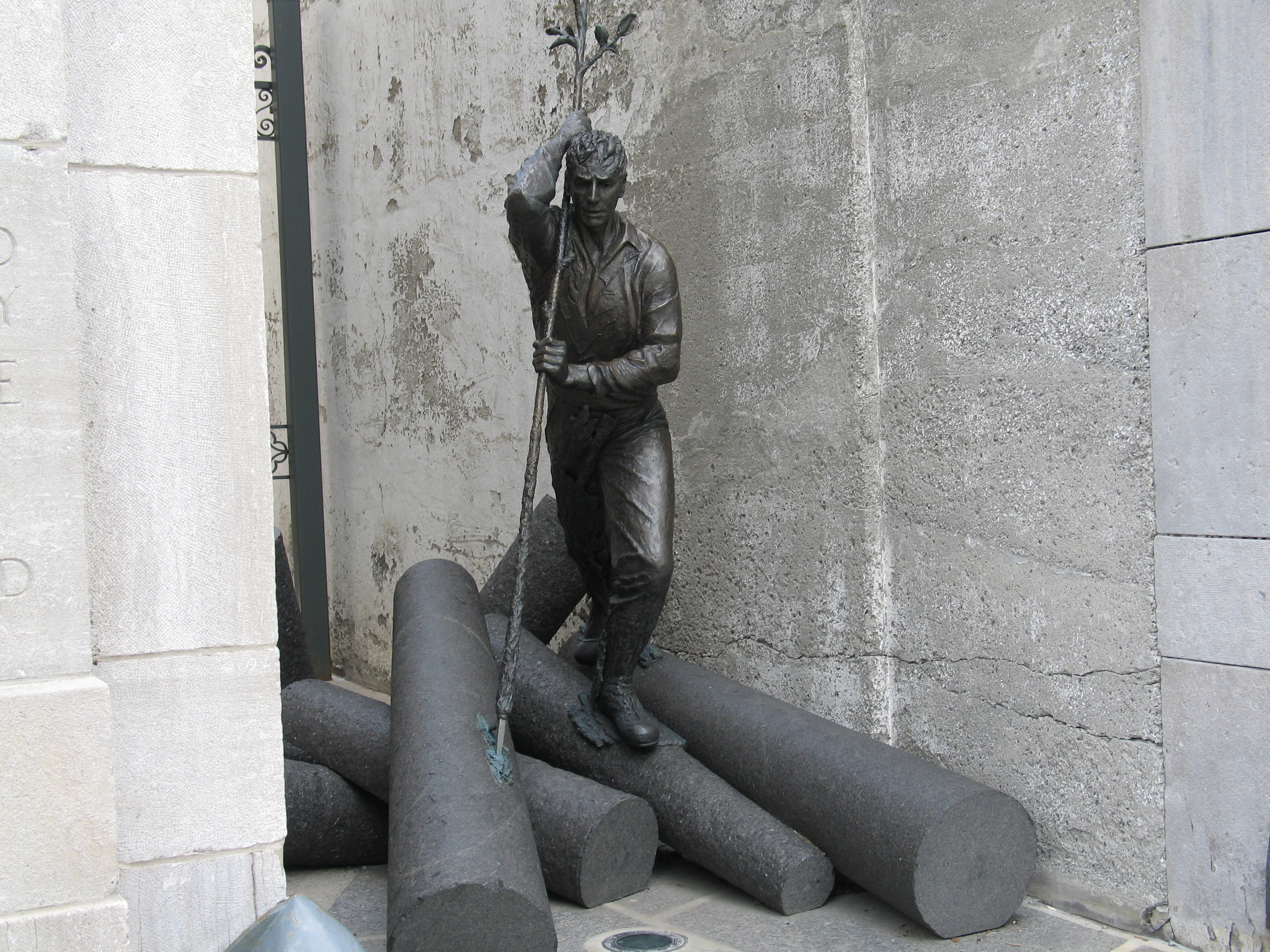
The "L'Homme-Rivière" ("The River-man") monument.

In 2002, a memorial was unveiled on Sainte-Anne between the Price Building and its right-hand neighbour (67–71 Sainte-Anne Street, a set of rowhouses). The memorial (French: Mémorial Price) is in the form of a sculpture, entitled "L'Homme-Rivière" ("The River-man"). It was sponsored by the CDP and the Virginia Parker Foundation, and designed by Quebec City artists Lucienne Cornet and Catherine Sylvain.

L'Homme-Rivière is a statue representing a log driver at work. The logs are heavily stylized, reduced to little more than cylinders. The driver and his hook, however, are shown as transforming into a wooden plant. Its location, in a tight space between two tall buildings, gives the sculpture the appearance of travelling down a river gorge. L'Homme-Rivière is highly dynamic, and has been described as looking as though it is about to spill onto the sidewalk. The log driver is a symbolic figure in the history and culture of Quebec, thanks notably to Félix-Antoine Savard's famous novel Menaud, maître draveur.

== Quebec Premier official residence ==
An apartment on the 16th and 17th floors has been the official residence of the premier of Quebec since 2001. These two floors, the highest habitable ones since the 18th floor is taken up by machinery, had originally been reserved for a CDP executive suite. There had been a previous attempt at offering the premier an official residence. In 1994, the Quebec City Chamber of Commerce had bought a large residence at 1080 rue des Braves and donated it to then premier Jacques Parizeau. There were issues of security and neighbour relationships, however, and Lucien Bouchard declined to use it. He lived in a small apartment on Parliament Hill for most of his mandate.

In May 2001, Bouchard′s successor Bernard Landry, who had until then lived in a three-room apartment, announced that he would accept the SITQ offer of the Price Building apartment, and took up occupancy in November. The choice, although praised for its symbolic location, attracted criticism that the apartment, rather small and poorly lit, could not accommodate a family (Landry was widowed from his first wife at the time). Some also noted that the former Lieutenant-Governor's residence, located at 1010 Chemin Saint-Louis and sold in 1996 for a fraction of its estimated value, would have made an excellent choice. From 1997 an exclusive psychiatric clinic had occupied the Price Building′s second and third floors. This was moved out in 2002; the administration strongly affirmed the timing with the Premier's installation to be a complete coincidence.

The 2,800 sq ft (260 m^{2}) apartment cost $195,000 to build and decorate. It includes a 14-guest dining room, two bedrooms and all the associated facilities. The Premier also has access to a reception hall on the 14th floor if need be. The apartment is richly appointed with maple hardwood floors, granite and limestone; its furnishings reproduce traditional Quebec styles, and is decorated with paintings by local artists on loan from the Musée du Québec.

In 2006, renewed criticism regarding current Premier Jean Charest′s limited use of the apartment led to another proposal for a proper official residence. Charest, who heads a family of five and lives in Montreal, saw little reason to move them across the province. These proposals were not taken further, and Charest′s successor, Pauline Marois, made regular use of the apartment.

== See also ==
- Marine Building: a contemporaneous (7 October 1930), similarly sized 22-floor skyscraper built in Vancouver.
