= Édifice Marie-Guyart =

Office skyscraper in Quebec City, Quebec

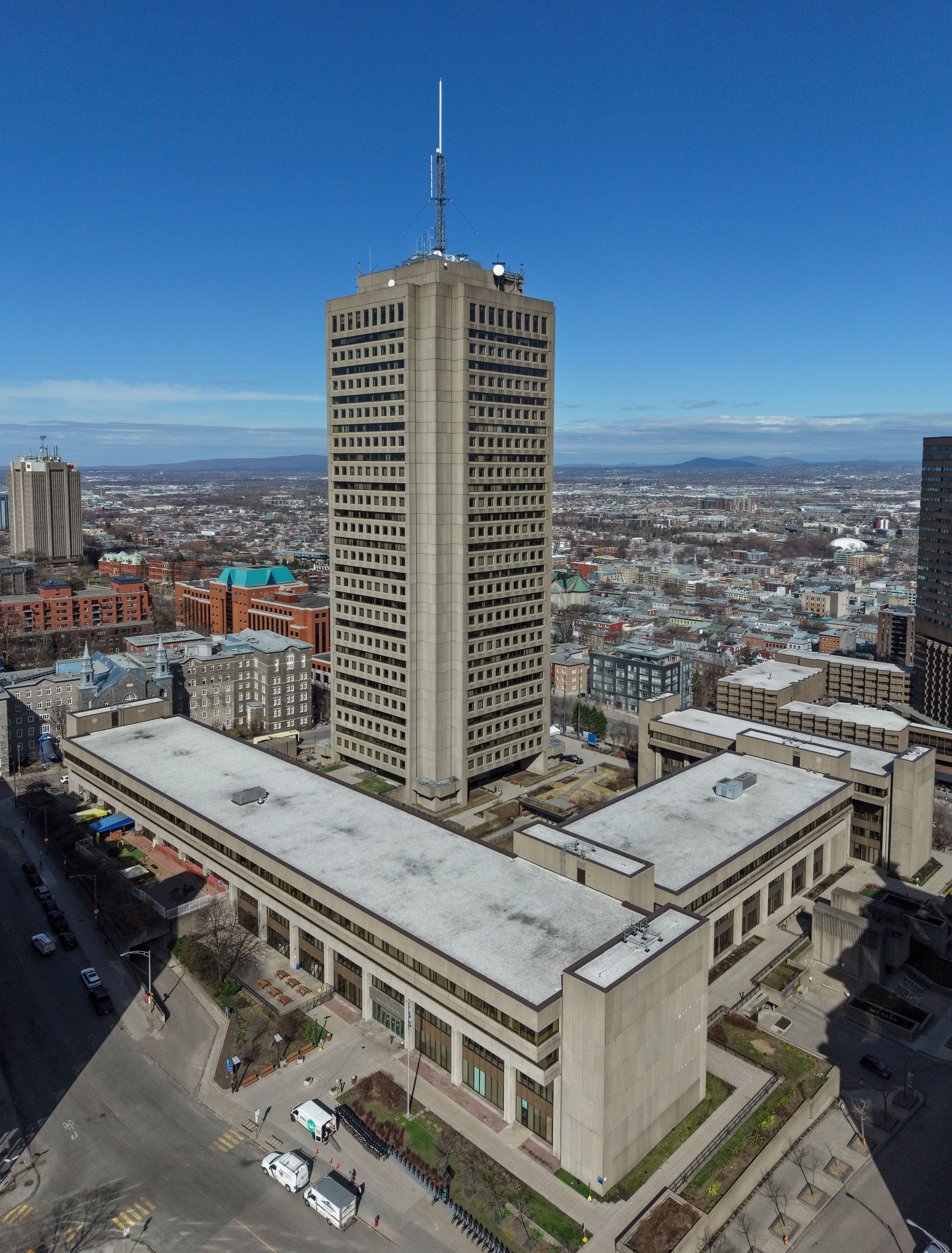
- Édifice Marie-Guyart in 2026
- Interactive map of the Édifice Marie-Guyart area

General information
- Status: Completed
- Type: Government offices
- Architectural style: Brutalist
- Location: 675, boulevard René-Lévesque Est; Quebec City, Quebec; G1R 5X9
- Coordinates: 46.808056°N 71.217222°W
- Completed: 1972

Height
- Antenna spire: 176.5 m (579 ft)
- Roof: 132 m (433 ft)

Technical details
- Floor count: 33

Website
- observatoire-capitale.com/en/

The Édifice Marie-Guyart, previously and still commonly known as Complexe G, is a 33-storey, 132 m (433 ft) office skyscraper completed in 1972 in Quebec City, Quebec, Canada. The brutalist style tower is the tallest building in the city, as well as the tallest building in Canada east of Montreal. Situated in the Parliament Hill borough, the building houses most notably the Ministry of Education, Recreation and Sports, the Ministry of Sustainable Development, Environment and Parks, as well the Observatoire de la Capitale observation deck.

== History ==
During the 1960s, as a result of the Quiet Revolution, the Government of Quebec undertook a period of rapid expansion, resulting in a greater need for office space in the downtown area. In 1961, the "Commission d'aménagment de Québec" (Quebec Planning Commission) was formed and in 1963 the Commission produced an ambitious plan for the area surrounding the Hôtel du Parlement. The different buildings outlined in the plan were identified by letters, hence the name "Complexe G". The first version of "Complexe G", which appeared in 1965, comprised four towers between 22 and 25 floors, a complex that would have offered two and a half times more floor space than what was eventually constructed. In 1969 the project was modified to include the current tower, as were two other towers between it and the Grand Théâtre de Québec. The existing buildings on the site were acquired and demolished, however these two additional towers were never constructed. Construction of the current tower began in 1967 and was completed in 1972.

In 1987, the tower was officially renamed "Édifice Marie-Guyart" in honour of Saint Marie of the Incarnation (born Marie Guyart), an Ursuline nun who was the religious foundress of the Ursuline order in New France.

== Observatoire de la Capitale ==
On the highest floor of the building, the Observatoire de la Capitale provides a 360 degree view of the city from a height of 221 meters. Visitors can see the Citadelle de Québec, the Château Frontenac and the countryside surrounding Quebec City.

== Gallery ==
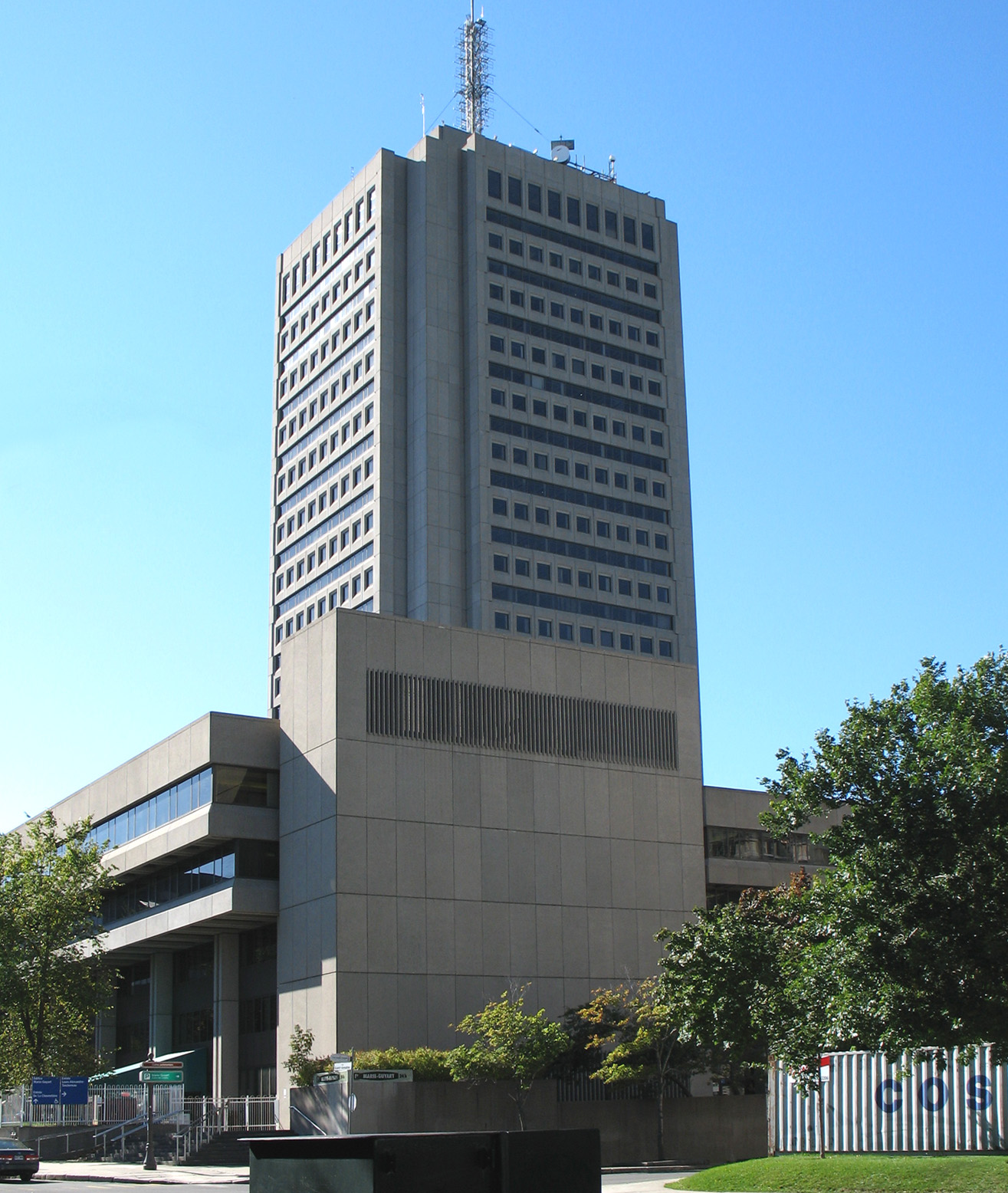

== See also ==
- List of tallest buildings in Quebec City
- Parliament Building (Quebec)
- Citadelle de Québec
- Château Frontenac
- Édifice André-Laurendeau
