= Parliament Hill (Quebec City) =

Coordinates: 46°48′30″N 71°13′00″W

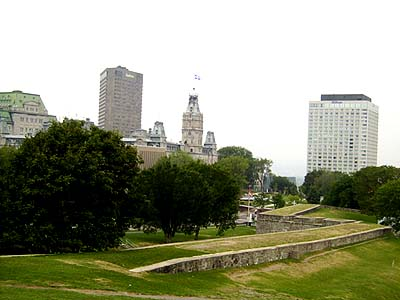
The Hill

Parliament Hill (French: Colline parlementaire, pronounced [kɔlin paʁləmɑ̃tɛʁ]) is located in Quebec City in the borough of La Cité-Limoilou, specifically in districts of Vieux-Québec—Cap-Blanc—colline Parlementaire and Saint-Jean-Baptiste. In addition to the Parliament Building of Quebec, the Hill has a few shopping streets and residential areas and public green spaces. The hill on which it is located is the promontory of Quebec.

In 1985, the complex of parliamentary building was declared a Site historique national ("National Historic Site of Canada").

== Parliamentary and government buildings ==
- 900, Boulevard René-Lévesque Est
- Centre des congrès du Québec
- Complexe du Parlement
  - Parliament Building (Hôtel du Parlement)
  - Édifice André-Laurendeau
  - Édifice Honoré-Mercier
  - Édifice Jean-Antoine-Panet
  - Édifice Pamphile-Le May
- Édifice Hector-Fabre
- Édifice J.-A.-Tardif
- Édifice Jean-Talon
- Édifice Lomer-Gouin
- Édifice Marie-Fitzbach
- Édifice Marie-Guyart
- Grand Théâtre de Québec et Conservatoire de musique
- Hôtel Delta Québec
- Hôtel Hilton
- Hôtel Le Concorde
- Observatoire de la Capitale
- Place Québec

== Residential and commercial buildings ==
- Chapelle historique Bon-Pasteur
- Club Renaissance
- Couvent des Franciscaines de Marie
- Église de Saint-Cœur-de-Marie
- Résidence de Louis-Alexandre Taschereau
- Tour Martello 2

== Monuments ==
Parliament Hill is adorned with several monuments.

- Fontaine de Tourny
- The Inuksuk
- Monument to Canadian Surveyors
- Monument to the Acadians
- Memorial plaque for the 125th Anniversary of the Press Gallery
- 1+1=1 (sculpture)
- Totem of the centenary of the entry of British Columbia into Confederation

== Bronze statues ==
Just like the bronze sculptures on the facade of the Parliament Building, these monuments are life sized, but the difference is that these are placed on pedestals and scattered in the gardens of Parliament Hill.

- Adelard Godbout (Premier in 1936 and from 1939 to 1944): by Michel Binette, this work has been inaugurated in autumn 2000 to mark the 60th anniversary of the obtaining the right to vote by women in Quebec.;
- Charles De Gaulle (President of the French Republic from 1959 to 1969): To recognize the contribution of the instigator of relations between France and Quebec, the sculpture was completed in 1997 by Fabien Pagé;
- Daniel Johnson, Sr. (Premier from 1966 to 1968, he welcomed General de Gaulle during Expo 67 in Montreal): The bust was sculpted by Paul Lancz and inaugurated in 1999.;
- François-Xavier Garneau (writer, he was the first to write the history of Canada from 1809 to 1866): The work of Paul Chevré was unveiled in 1912;
- Honoré Mercier (an ardent defender of Quebec's autonomy and premier from 1887 to 1891): A work of Paul Chevré from 1912;
- Jean Lesage (Premier from 1961 to 1966 and father of the Quiet Revolution): A work of Annick Bourgeau finished in 2000;
- Louis-Hippolyte La Fontaine (Reform leader and premier of United Canada from 1848 to 1851 in the first responsible government):The sculpture is the work of sculptor Henri Hebert and was unveiled in 2003 on the establishment of the National Assembly, although it was placed on the front the hotel in 1921;
- Louis-Joseph Papineau (leader of the parti patriote from 1826, he assumed leadership of the protest movement of the Patriots in 1837): Launched in 2002, the sculpture is the work of Suzanne Gravel Yvon Billion;
- Maurice Duplessis (Premier from 1944 to 1959 period of the so-called Grande Noirceur): A sculpture by Emile Brunet created in 1960, but unveiled in 1977;
- Louis-Joseph de Montcalm (Lieutenant-General of the French troops during the Battle of the Plains of Abraham in 1760): Created in 1911, is the work of the sculptor Léopold Morice and the architect Paul Chabert;
- René Lévesque (Premier from 1976 to 1985 within the first sovereigntist government): A work of Fabien Pagé unveiled in 2001;
- Monument Robert Bourassa (Premier from 1970 to 1976 and from 1985 to 1994, he developed the hydroelectric potential of northern Quebec): Launched in 2006, the work is by sculptor-molder Jules Lasalle.
- Short and Wallick (Soldiers Short and Wallick are the two heroes who saved the inhabitants of the fire at Saint-Sauveur in the lower town of Quebec in 1889): The monument was created by the sculptor Louis-Philippe Hébert and erected at Parliament Hill (Quebec City) in the park opposite the Armoury in 1891.

== Parks, squares and promenades ==
- Parc de l'Amérique-Française: This park is dedicated to francophone communities in North America founded by Quebecers and Acadians;
- Parc de la Francophonie: This park recalls the 25th anniversary of the Agence de coopération culturelle et technique des pays ayant le français en partage;
- Place-National Assembly: Public space located directly opposite the Parliament Building;
- Place Berthelot
- Place George-V
- Promenade des Acadiens : The drive and the monument were created in tribute to the Acadian people for their "outstanding contributions to the Quebec nation";
- Promenade des Premiers-Ministres: Located along the Parliament complex, the walk honors the 26 Premiers of Quebec from Confederation until 1996.

== Roads and Streets ==
- Grande Allée Est
- Avenue Galipeault
- Avenue George-VI
- Avenue Honoré-Mercier
- Avenue Taché
- Avenue Turnbull
- Avenue Wilfrid-Laurier
- Boulevard René-Lévesque Est
- Côte d'Abraham
- Côte de la Potasse
- Cours du Général-De Montcalm
- Place Berthelot
- Place George-V Est and Ouest
- Rue de l'Amérique-Française
- Rue Antonio-Barette
- Rue d'Artigny
- Rue du Bon-Pasteur
- Rue de la Chevrotière
- Rue de Claire-Fontaine
- Rue Dauphine
- Rue Jean-Jacques-Bertrand
- Rue de Joly-De Lotbinière
- Rue Louis-Alexandre-Taschereau
- Rue des Parlementaires
- Rue Prévost
- Rue René-Jalbert
- Rue Richelieu
- Rue Saint-Amable
- Rue Saint-Gabriel
- Rue Saint-Joachim
- Rue Saint-Louis
- Rue Saint-Patrick
- Rue de Senezergues
