= Hôtel Le Concorde =

Hotel in Quebec City, Quebec

Hôtel Le Concorde Québec
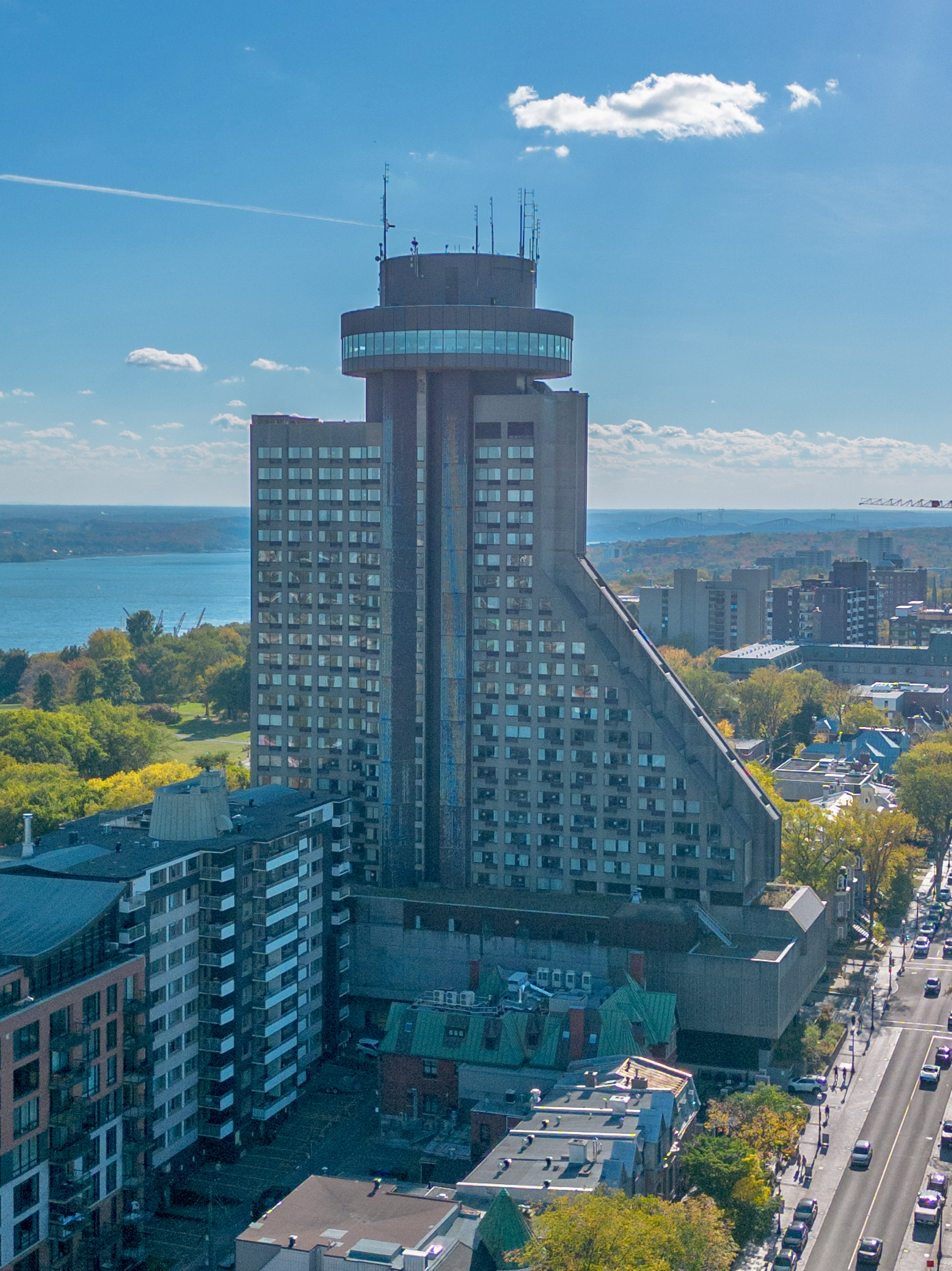
- Hôtel Le Concorde in 2025
- Interactive map of the Hôtel Le Concorde Québec area

General information
- Status: Completed
- Type: Hotel
- Architectural style: Brutalist
- Location: 1255, cours du Général-de-Montcalm; Quebec City, Quebec; G1R 4W6
- Coordinates: 46.805107°N 71.21711°W
- Completed: 1974

Height
- Roof: 91 m (299 ft)

Technical details
- Floor count: 31

Design and construction
- Architect: Dimitri Dimakopoulos

Hôtel Le Concorde Québec is a skyscraper hotel in Quebec City, Quebec, Canada. It contains 405 rooms over 26 floors. Le Concorde is known for its revolving restaurant, Ciel! (formerly L'Astral), which is situated on the top floor of the hotel and offers a 360-degree view of Quebec City and the Saint Lawrence River. The hotel is located in the historic restaurant district La Grande Allée and behind is the historic national park The Plains of Abraham (French: Les plaines d'Abraham) and The Battlefields Park (French: Parc des Champs-de-Bataille).

== History ==
The hotel was constructed by wealthy businessman Marcel Adams, owner of Développement Iberville, and designed by architect Dimitri Dimakopoulos. It opened on 1 April 1974 as Loews Le Concorde, operated by Loews Hotels, under the terms of a 99-year lease. In 2069, at the end of this lease, ownership was to return to Adams or his successor.

In November 2013, Loews announced that the hotel would cease operations in February 2014. In January 2014, it was announced that the hotel would be sold to Groupe Savoie for $11,5M in order to transform it into a luxury retirement apartment building. This plan was met with opposition from local businesses, who feared the loss of customers from the hotel. In the end, the hotel closed briefly and was repurchased for $13M by the businessman Jean-Guy Sylvain, who already owned other hotels in the Old Capital region, and his associates who renovated the building. The hotel reopened in May 2014 as Hôtel Le Concorde Québec, no longer affiliated with Loews. Since October 2015, as a landmark building, its exterior is illuminated at night.

== See also ==
- List of tallest buildings in Quebec City
