= Château Frontenac =

Hotel in Quebec City, Canada

Fairmont Le Château Frontenac

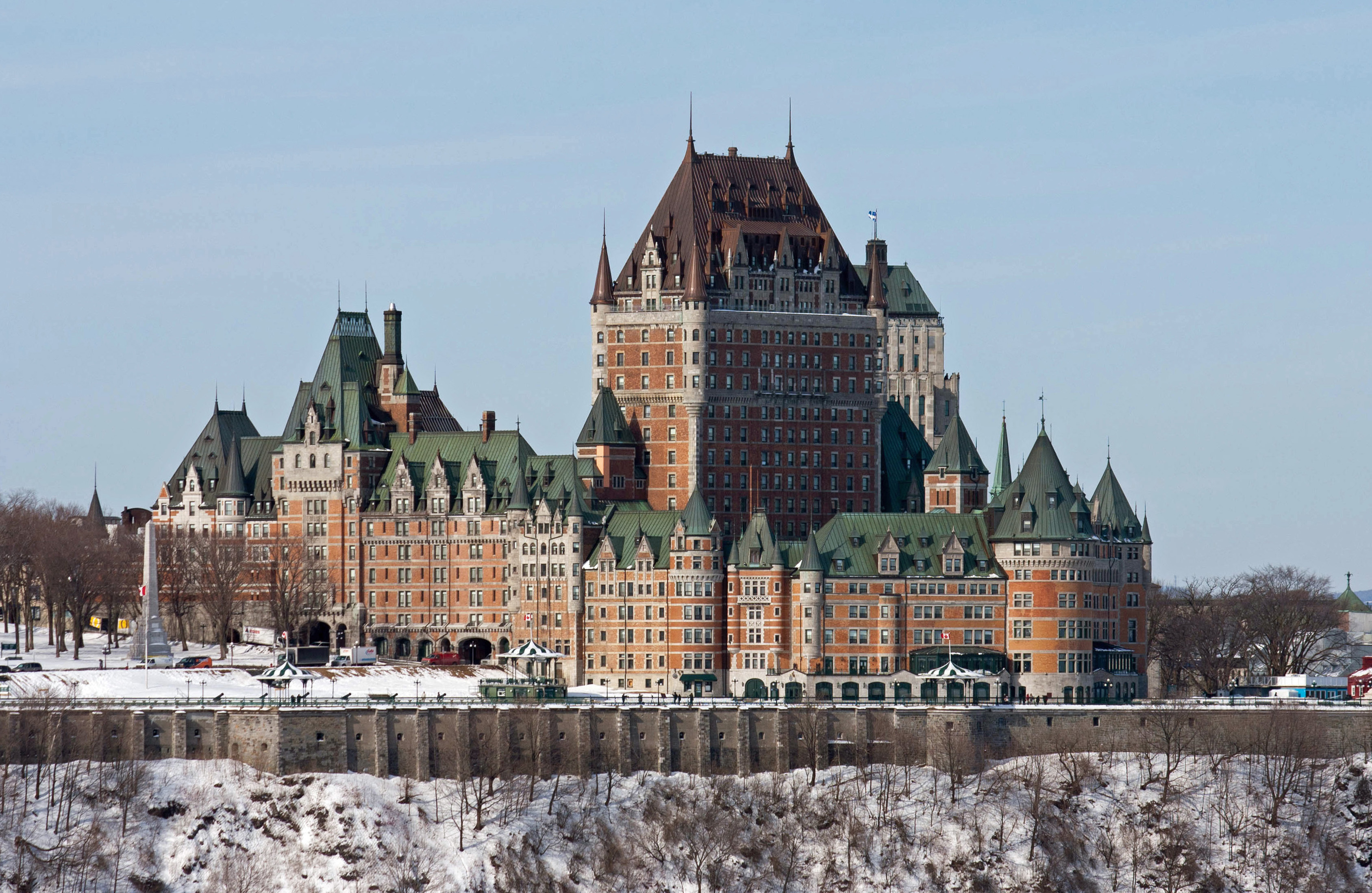
- Château Frontenac, viewed across the Saint Lawrence River from Lévis, Quebec in 2013
- Former names: Château Frontenac

Record height
- Tallest in Quebec City from 1924 to 1930^{[I]}
- Preceded by: Parliament Building of Quebec
- Surpassed by: Édifice Price

General information
- Location: 1, rue des Carrières; Quebec City, Quebec; G1R 4P5
- Coordinates: 46°48′43″N 71°12′18″W
- Named for: Louis de Buade de Frontenac
- Groundbreaking: May 1892
- Opened: 18 December 1893
- Owner: Ivanhoé Cambridge
- Operator: Fairmont Hotels and Resorts

Height
- Height: 80 m (260 ft)

Technical details
- Floor count: 18

Design and construction
- Architect: Bruce Price
- Developer: Canadian Pacific Railway

Other information
- Number of rooms: 610
- Number of restaurants: 4

Website
- fairmont.com/frontenac-quebec

National Historic Site of Canada
- Official name: Château Frontenac National Historic Site of Canada
- Designated: 15 January 1981

The Fairmont Le Château Frontenac, commonly referred to as the Château Frontenac (French pronunciation: [ʃɑto fʁɔ̃tnak]), is a historic hotel in Quebec City, Quebec, Canada. The hotel is situated in Old Quebec, within the historic district's Upper Town, on the southern side of Place d'Armes. The Château Frontenac was designed by New York architect Bruce Price in the Château style. It was built by the Canadian Pacific Railway company. The hotel is managed by Fairmont Hotels & Resorts. It is considered the most photographed hotel in the world.

Opened in 1893, the building has 18 floors; its 79.9-metre (262-foot) height is augmented by its 54-metre (177-foot) ground elevation. It was one of the first of Canada's grand railway hotels, and was designated a National Historic Site of Canada in 1981. The hotel was expanded on three occasions, with the last major expansion taking place in 1993.

== Location ==
The Château Frontenac is situated on 1, rue des Carrières, at the eastern edge of Old Quebec's Upper Town, built on the promontory of Quebec, a raised mass of land that projects into the Saint Lawrence River. The hotel property is bounded by rue Saint Louis to the north, and rue Mont Carmel to the south. Terrasse Dufferin is a terrace that wraps around the hotel from the northeast to the southeast, overlooking the Saint Lawrence River. Two public roads run through the hotel, rue du Trésor, and rue des Carrières. The hotel building was designated as a National Historic Site of Canada, known as the Château Frontenac National Historic Site of Canada. The area was designated as a National Historic Site in January 1981.

Located near the edge of the promontory of Quebec, the Château Frontenac is situated near several major historic attractions within the historic district of Old Quebec's Upper Town. To the northwest of the hotel lies the Ursulines Monastery of Quebec, a 17th-century monastery founded by a missionary group of Ursuline nuns, and another National Historic Site of Canada. To the south of the hotel lies the Plains of Abraham, a historic area within The Battlefields Park, and the site of the Battle of the Plains of Abraham. Another major attraction south of the hotel is the Citadelle of Quebec, situated at the atop Cap Diamant, an elevated point of the promontory. The Citadelle serves as an active military installation for the Canadian Armed Forces, as well as a secondary official residence for the Canadian monarch and the Governor General of Canada. East of the hotel lies the Terrasse Dufferin, and Old Quebec's Lower Town directly below it.

The Château Frontenac was not the first large building on the site. The first one was built during the 1780s, and was known as the Château Haldimand, named after the Governor of Quebec who ordered its construction. It was demolished in 1892 to make way for the present hotel.

== Design ==
=== Architecture ===
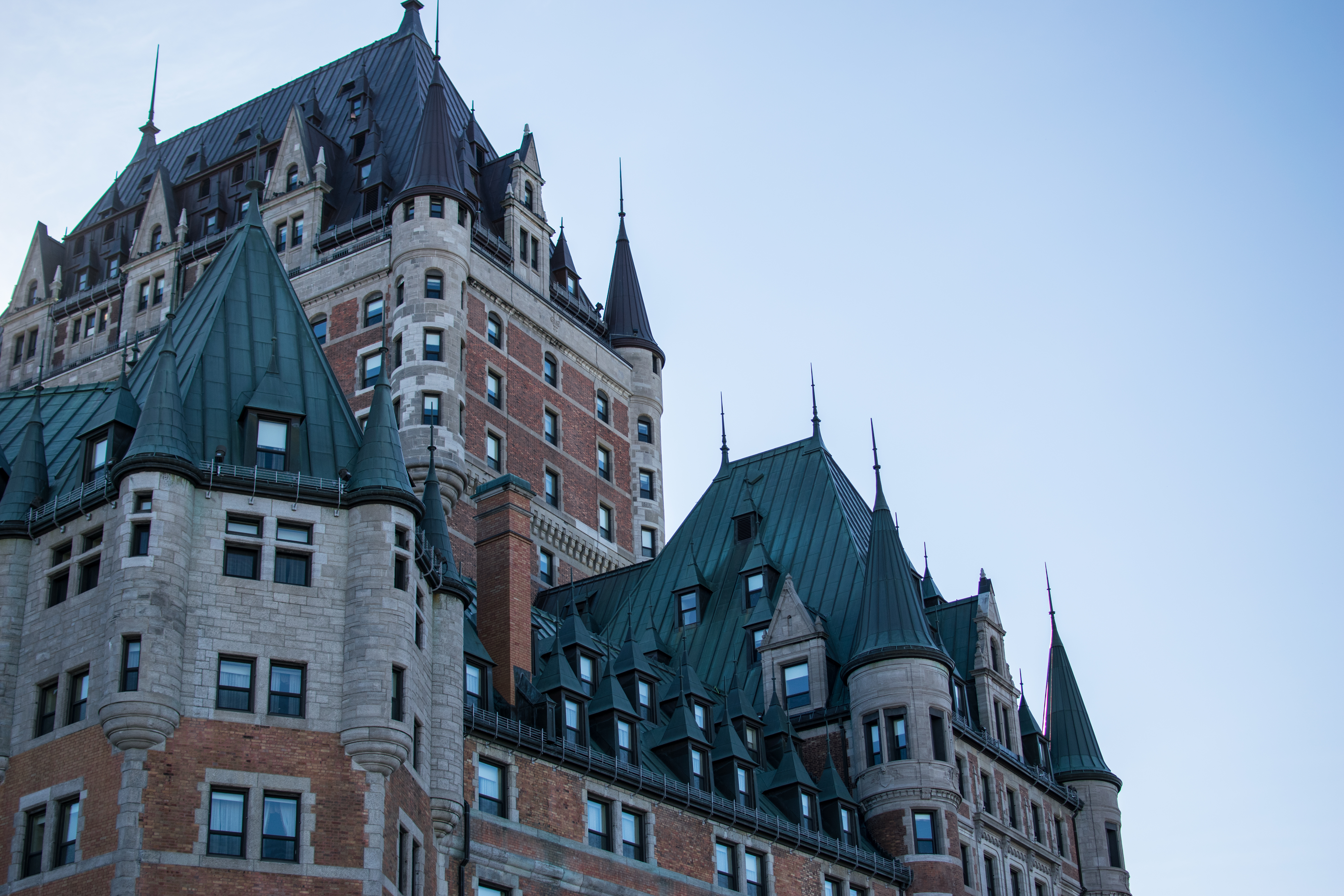
Designed in a Châteauesque style, the building features steep pitched roofs, circular and polygonal towers, and ornate gables and dormers.

The Château Frontenac is one of Canada's grand railway hotels built by the Canadian Pacific Railway. The Châteauesque architectural style used throughout the hotel would later serve as a template for other Canadian grand railway hotels erected in the late-19th to early-20th century. The central fortress-like tower design is derived from medieval châteaux found throughout France's Loire Valley. The Châteaue style includes elements such as the hotel's asymmetrical profile, with steeply pitched roofs, massive circular and polygonal towers and turrets, a central portal, ornate gables and dormers, and tall chimneys. The exterior base of the hotel is largely made of grey stone ashlar, with steel framing running up the building, Glenboig brick cladding. Materials that make up the interior of the building includes mahogany panelling, marble staircases, carved stone, wrought iron, and glass roundels. However, as opposed to the other Châteauesque-styled buildings found in France, the Château Frontenac did not utilize elements of Italianate architecture, instead placing a greater emphasis on Gothic elements. The hotel also draws certain elements from Victorian style of architecture, with rich polychromatic surfaces throughout its exterior.

Built in 1892–93, the Château Frontenac was originally designed by architect Bruce Price. Price's plan called for a horseshoe-shaped hotel, made up of four wings of unequal length, connected at obtuse angles. Public rooms made up the majority of the first two floors of Price's designs. The original proposal called for a square structure, however the completion of the Terrasse Dufferin led to the development for a more picturesque building. Since its completion, the hotel has undergone several major expansions and renovations led by several different architects and architectural firms. William Sutherland Maxwell led two major expansions to the hotel, one in 1908–09, and another in 1920–24 (co-led with his brother, Edward Maxwell). Renovations in the 1990s were led by one of Canada's most successful firms, Arcop, an architectural firm based in Montreal. The hotel was again expanded in 1993, with the addition of a new wing, which was led by a then young architect who is now one of the most respected architects in the hotel and hospitality business in Canada, Robert LaPierre, Member of the 2011 Fellows – Royal Architectural Institute of Canada.

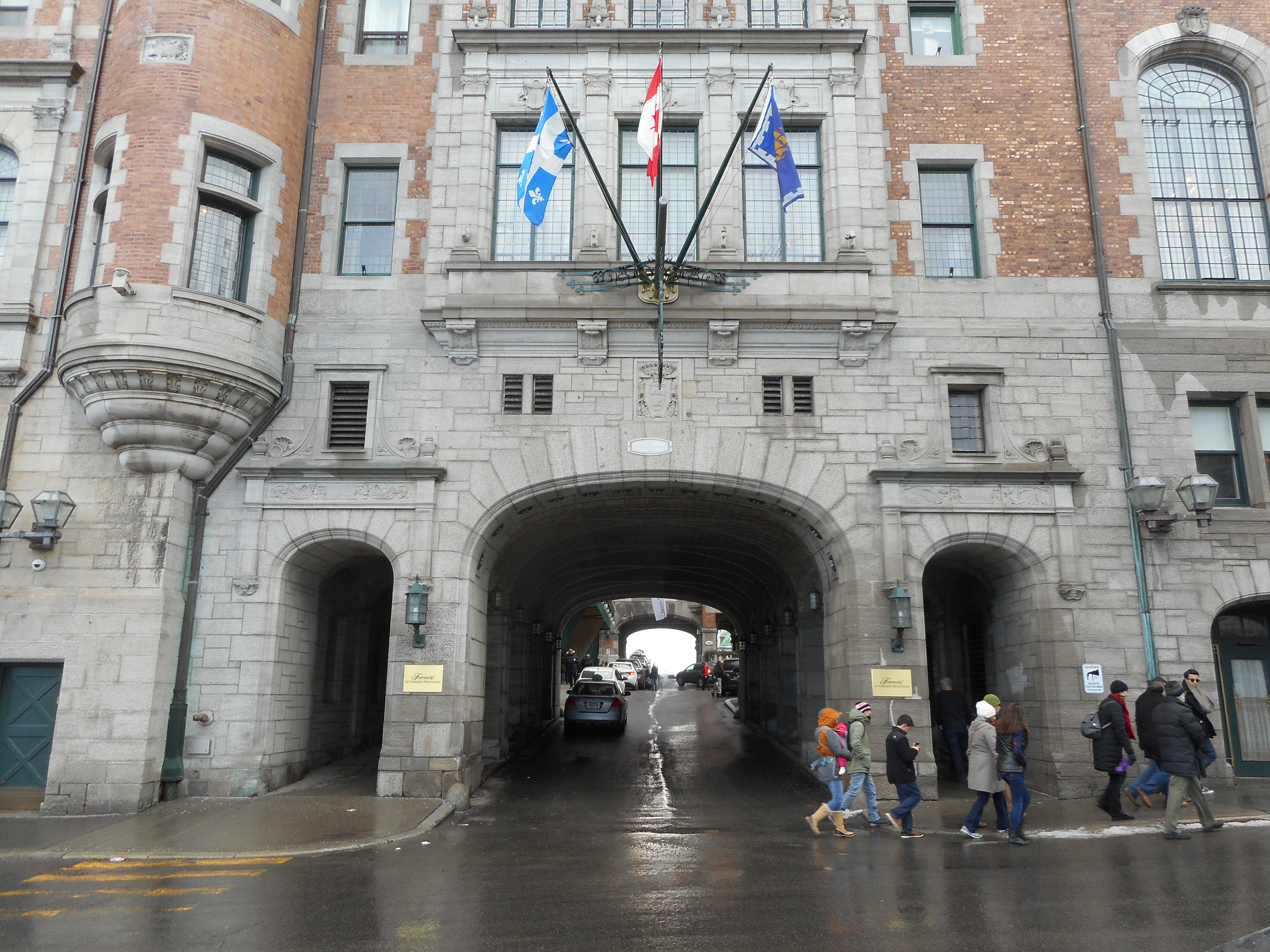
Several porte-cochères provide access to the hotel's central courtyard.

Access to the hotel's main entrance is marked by several porte-cochères with large dormers and a cupola. The porte-cochère leads guests into the hotel's central courtyard, as well as the entrance to the hotel's main lobby. The building stands 80-metre-tall (260 ft), containing 18 floors primarily made up of guest rooms and other hotel amenities. After the addition of the tallest tower in 1924, the hotel became the tallest building in Quebec City. It remained the city's tallest building until 1930, when the Édifice Price was completed just northwest of the hotel. Although several buildings in Quebec City are taller, the hotel continues to hold a prominent position in the city's skyline, as it is perched atop a tall cape overlooking the Saint Lawrence River.

=== Facilities ===
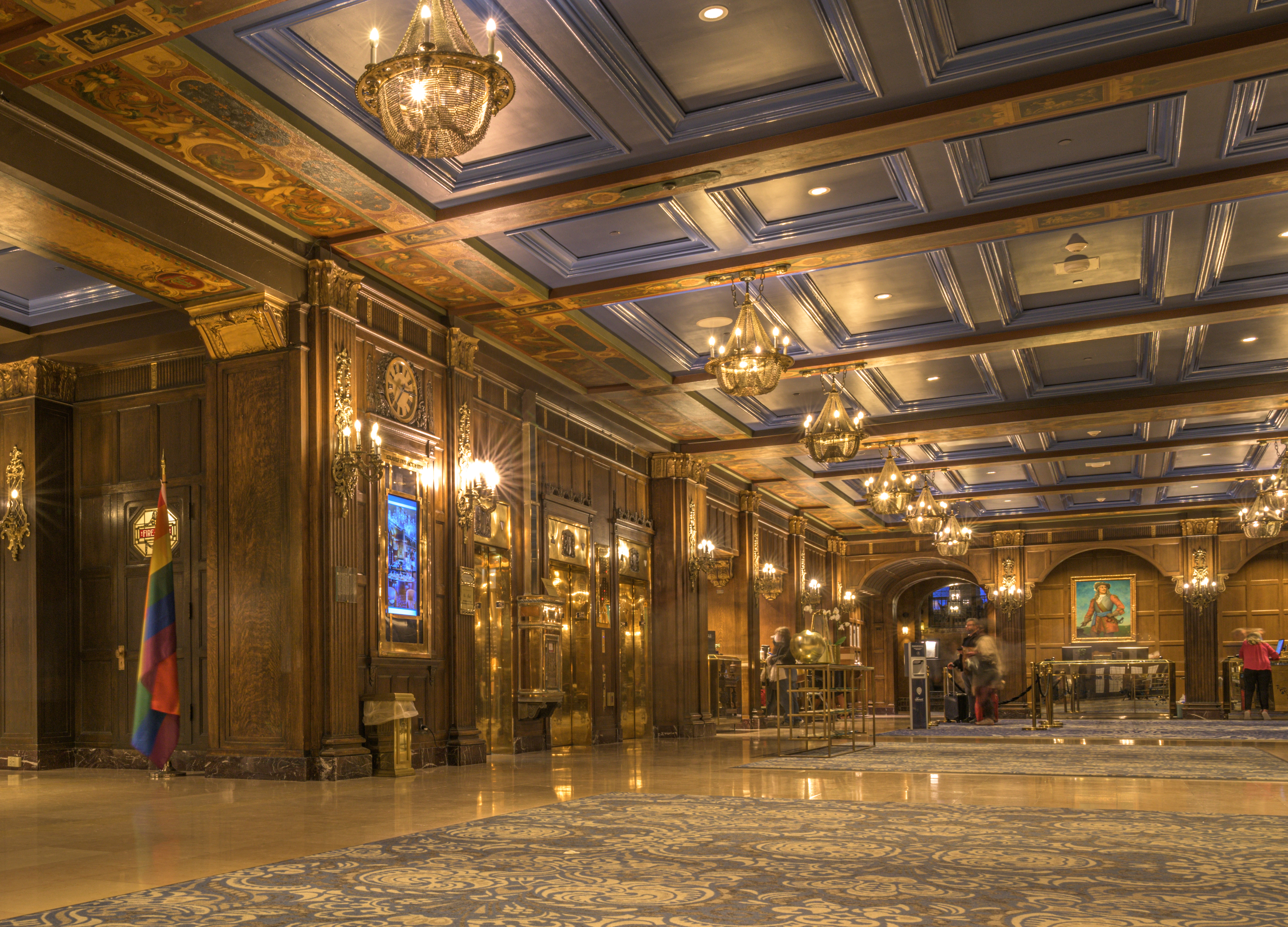
Hotel lobby

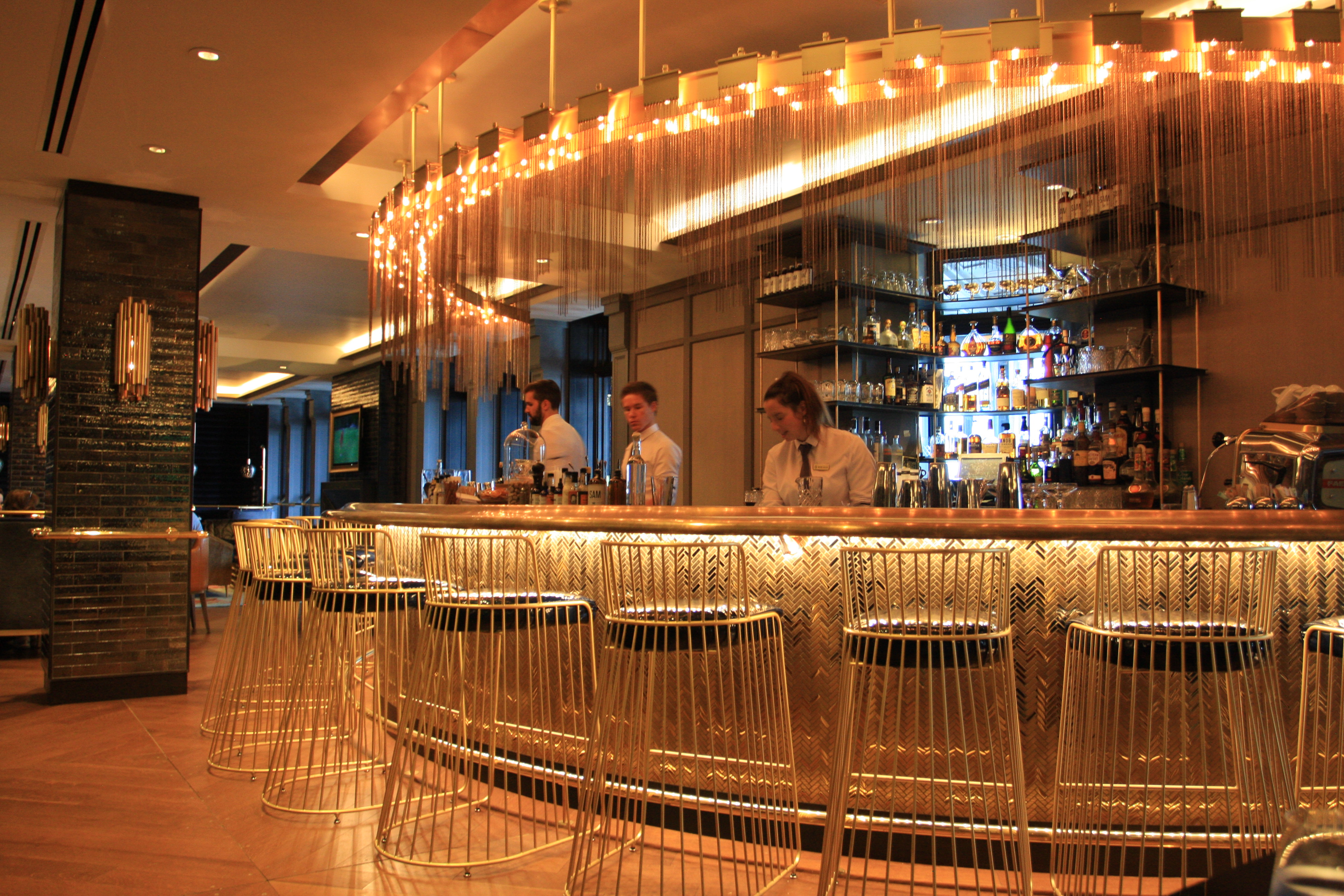
Château Frontenac Bar

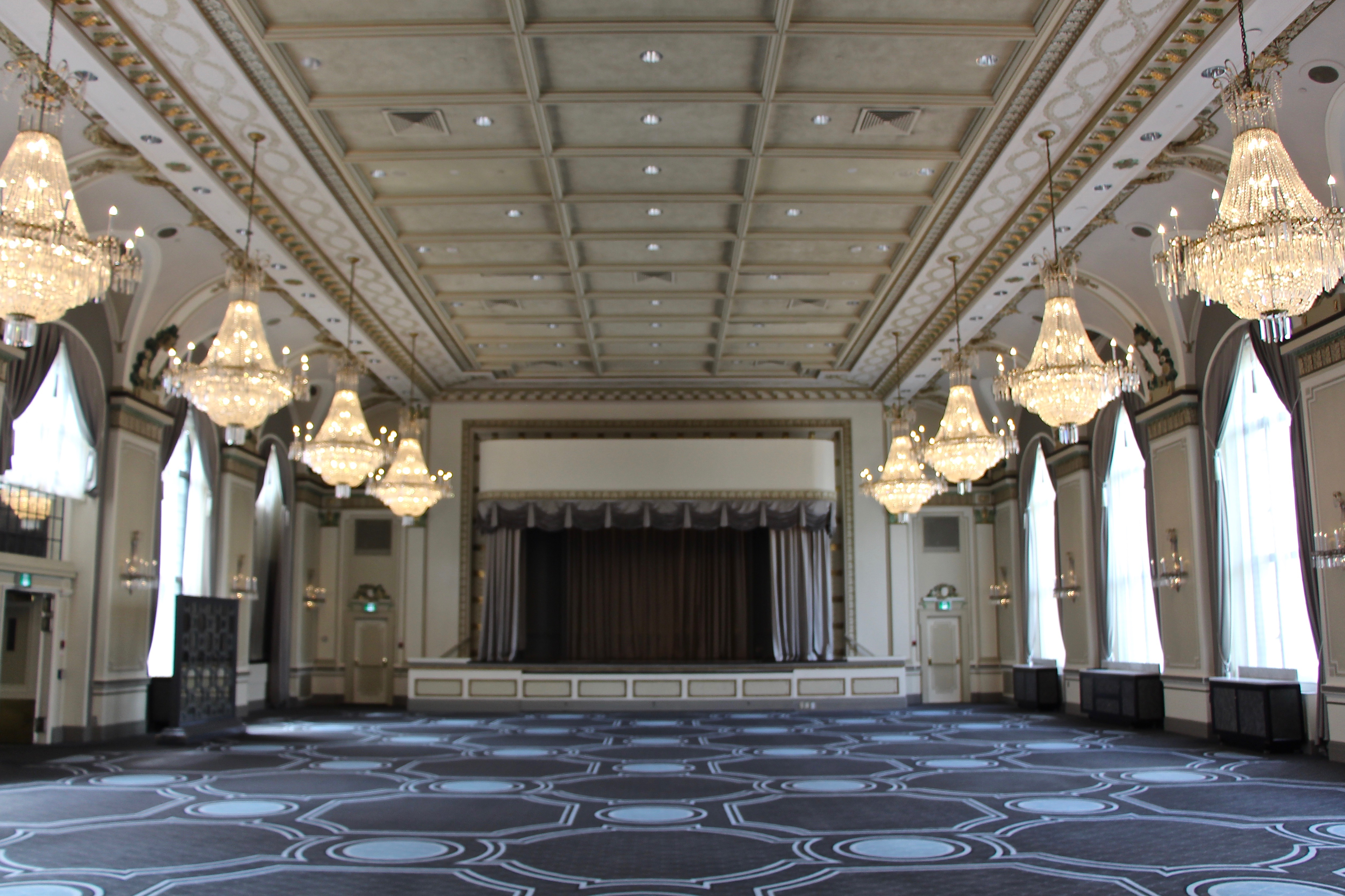
Ballroom

The Château Frontenac includes 610 guest rooms and suites spread throughout the hotel building. Eight executive suites were renovated into specialty "themed rooms". Most of the suites are themed to the heads of state and government that have visited the hotel, such as the Trudeau-Trudeau Suite, named after two Canadian Prime Ministers, Pierre Elliott Trudeau, and Justin Trudeau. The Churchill Suite and Roosevelt Suite are two suites named after attendees of the First and Second Quebec Conferences, British Prime Minister Winston Churchill and American President Franklin D. Roosevelt, respectively. Other suites themed in honour of world leaders include the Charles de Gaulle, named after the former President of France, and the Elizabeth II, named for the former Queen of Canada.

Aside from world leaders, the hotel also offers suites themed to Alfred Hitchcock, a director who filmed much of I Confess at the hotel; William Cornelius Van Horne, the second President of the Canadian Pacific Railway; and Celine Dion. The Celine Dion Heritage Suite utilizes an Art Deco style throughout the suite, decorated with images from Dion's family photographer.

A number of rooms at the Château Frontenac are also occupied by restaurants and other food-based services. As of 2018, three restaurants operate within the hotel: 1608 Wine and Cheese Bar, Bistro Le Sam, and Champlain. As a part of Fairmont Hotels and Resorts' larger "Bee Sustainable" program, the Château Frontenac hosts four queen honey bees in hives on the hotel's rooftop garden. The honey is harvested three times a year and is used by the hotel's restaurants. The hotel has nearly 70,000 honey bees producing 295 kilograms (650 lb) of honey per year. The hotel's rooftop apiary also operates a pollinator hotel.

The Château was the recipient of the 2022 Global Hotel of the Year Award.

== History ==
=== Background ===
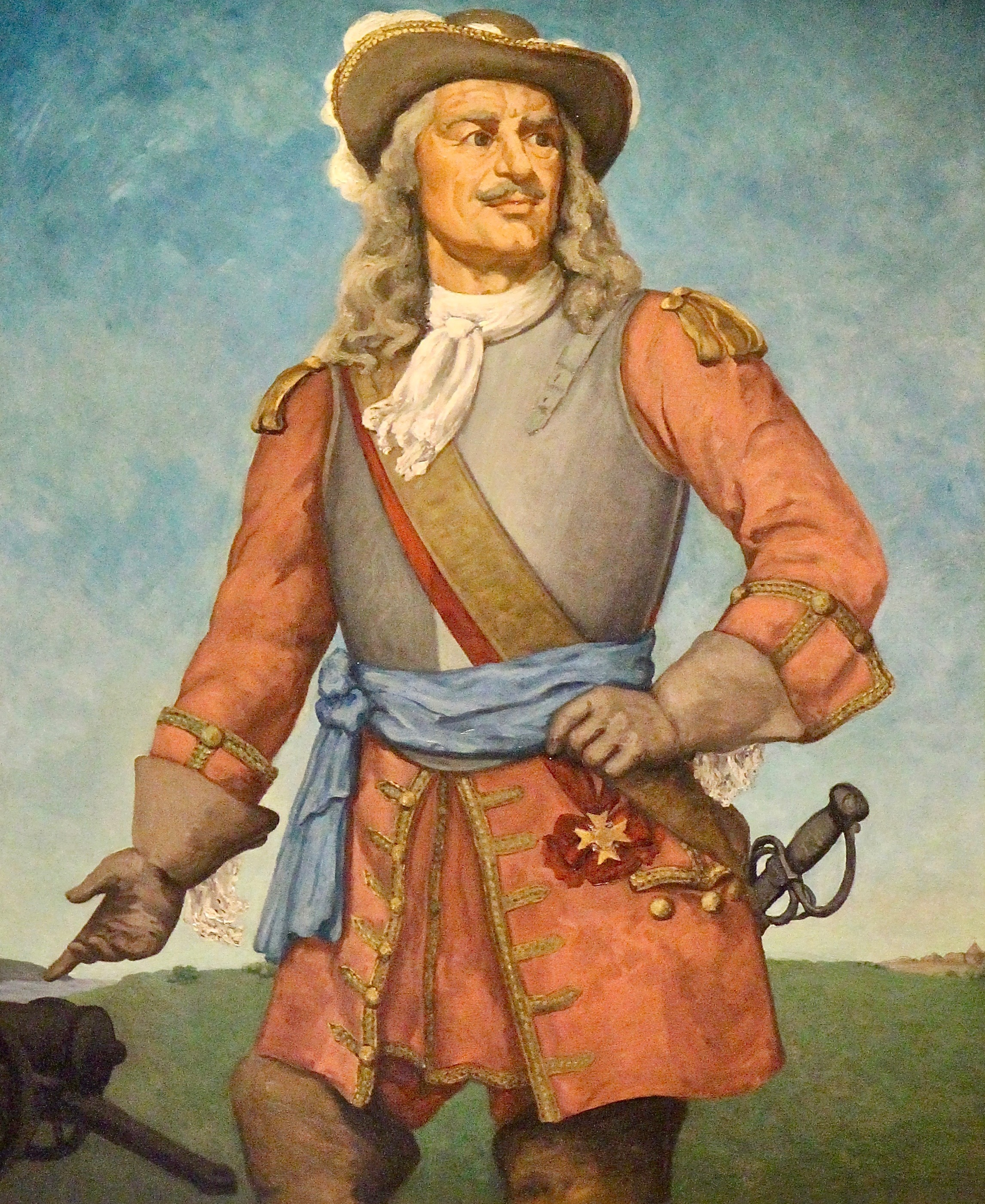
Portrait of Louis de Buade de Frontenac at the hotel lobby. The hotel was named after the former Governor General of New France.

In the 1870s, a restoration project began in Quebec under the British governor general of Canada aimed at restoring the capital to its former 17th century look. One of the contributors to this project was Lord Dufferin, who supervised the construction of the old city wall and many public buildings that followed the theme of old, medieval, European Quebec. Dufferin also made a plan to reconstruct the Château Saint-Louis which was located on the cape where the Château Frontenac currently stands and served as the home of the French governors from 1620 to 1834. Dufferin's plan did not take off until the City Council and the Board of Trade adopted the idea and planned to instead construct a grand hotel on the site to attract upper-class tourism to the area, but after failing to finance its construction, businessmen from Toronto and Montreal with connections to the Canadian Pacific Railway took control of the project.

=== 1890s–present ===
The Château Frontenac was completed in 1893, and was designed by American architect Bruce Price and overseen by William Van Horne, the Canadian Pacific Railway's general manager and a key developer of the Canadian railway hotel system. The hotel was a part of a series of Châteauesque-styled hotels built for the Canadian Pacific Railway company during the late 19th and early 20th centuries. The last of the Canadian Pacific Railway's Châteauesque hotels was completed in 1908, leaving the rival company Grand Trunk Railway to continue the trend. The hotel was expanded in 1924 to designs by William Sutherland Maxwell. The 1924 expansion saw the addition of the hotel's central tower, which was built by Anglin-Norcross of Montreal. The hotel was named after Louis de Buade, Count of Frontenac, who was the Governor General of New France from 1672 to 1682, and again from 1689 to 1698.

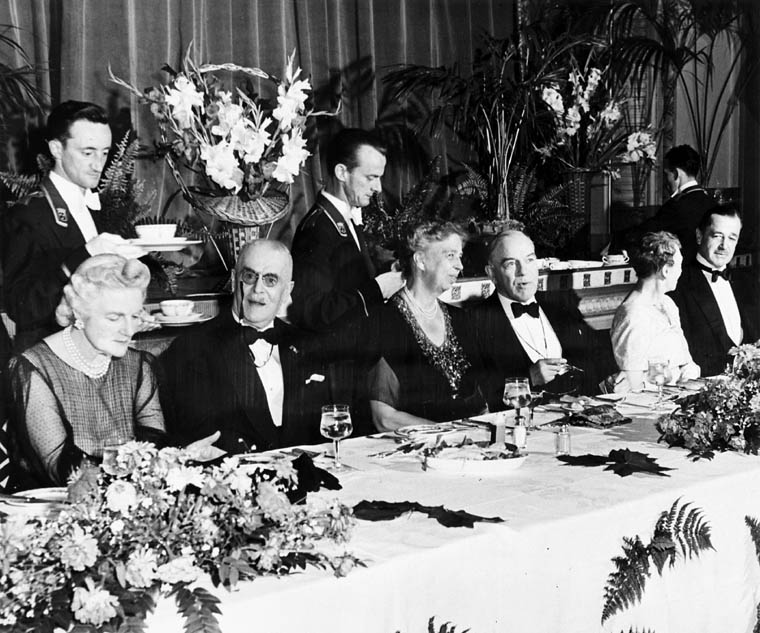
Reception for the Second Quebec Conference, at the Château Frontenac. The allies of World War II met there twice during the war.

The World War II Allies met there during the First and Second Quebec Conference (in 1943 and 1944 respectively). During these conferences, officials including American President Franklin Delano Roosevelt, British Prime Minister Sir Winston Churchill, and Canadian Prime Minister William Lyon Mackenzie King, discussed strategy for World War II.

In 1993, the hotel saw another expansion, with the addition of the new wing that included a pool, fitness centre, and outdoor terrace. On June 14, 1993, Canada Post issued a 'Le Château Frontenac, Québec' stamp designed by Kosta Tsetsekas, based on illustrations by Heather Price. The $C0.43 stamp features an image of the hotel building, and has a perforated edge and is 13.5mm square. The stamp was printed by Ashton-Potter Limited.

In 2001, the hotel was sold to Legacy REIT, which is partially owned by Fairmont, for $185 million. The hotel was renamed the Fairmont Le Château Frontenac in November 2001, shortly after Canadian Pacific Hotels reformed itself as Fairmont Hotels and Resorts, taking the name of an American company it acquired in 2001.

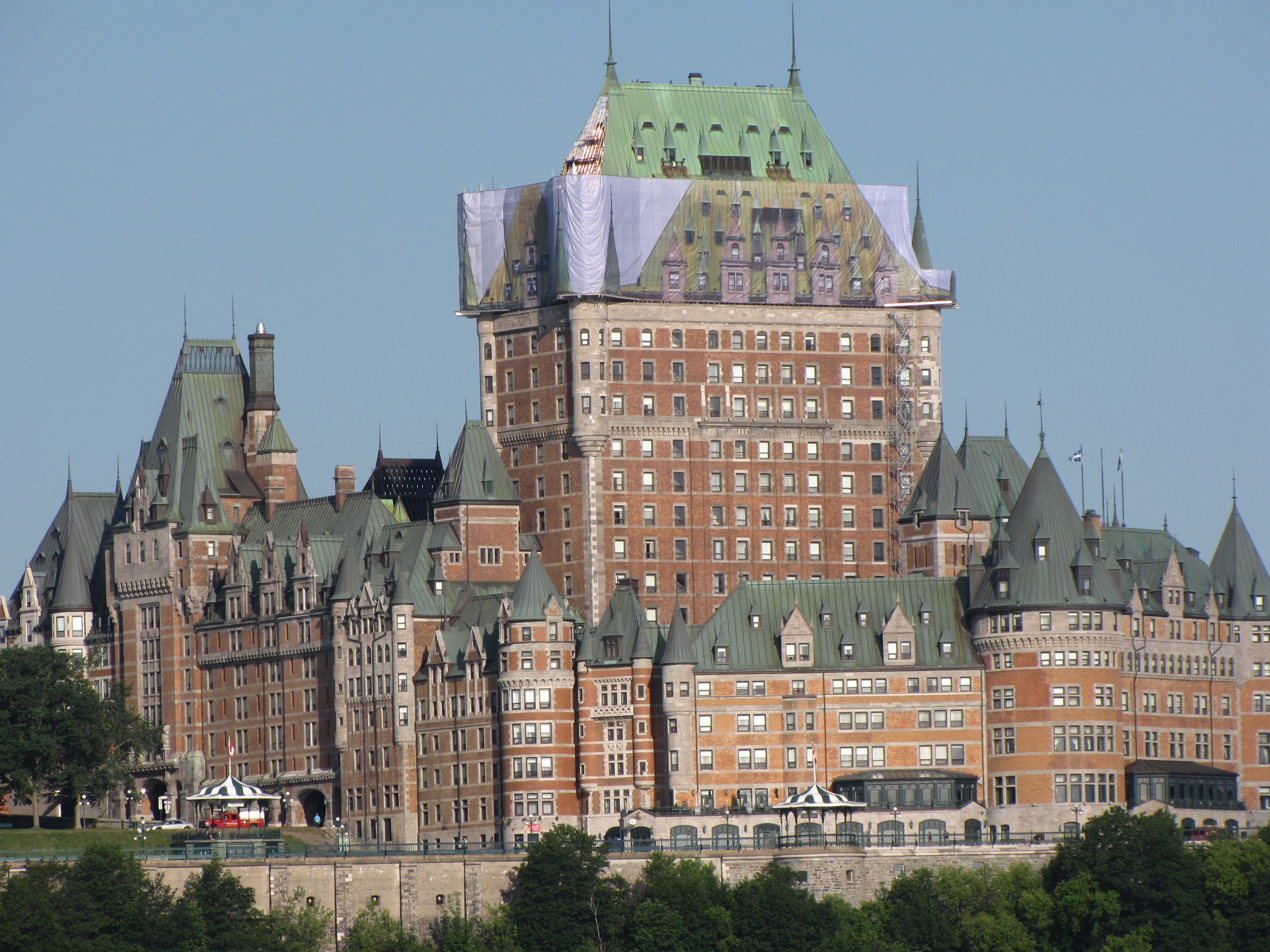
An image of the hotel's roof imposed on safety netting and hung from scaffolding to hide refurbishment work on the hotel in July 2011.

In 2011, the hotel was sold to Ivanhoé Cambridge. Shortly after acquiring the hotel, Ivanhoé Cambridge announced an investment of $9 million for the restoration of the building's masonry work, and the replacement of the building's copper roofs. The company further announced another $66 million investment for general improvements and renovations throughout the hotel. When the roof was being replaced, an image of the roof was printed on polypropylene safety netting and hung from scaffolding to hide the refurbishing project from view. The extensive renovation saw conference rooms expanded, restaurants remodeled, modernization of the lobby, and the gutting and rebuilding of three-fifths of the hotel's rooms.

== In popular culture ==
In 1953, the Château Frontenac was used as the filming location for the opening scene in the Alfred Hitchcock film I Confess, featuring Montgomery Clift and Anne Baxter.

The hotel was used for a location in the second season of the crime drama series La Faille, Le meurtre du château, (Note: English: The Chateau Murder) which aired in 2021.

== See also ==
- Architecture of Quebec City
- Governors' Garden
- List of hotels in Canada
- Wolfe–Montcalm Monument
