= City Hall of Quebec City =

Historic site in Quebec, Canada

Quebec City Hall
- Hôtel de ville de Québec
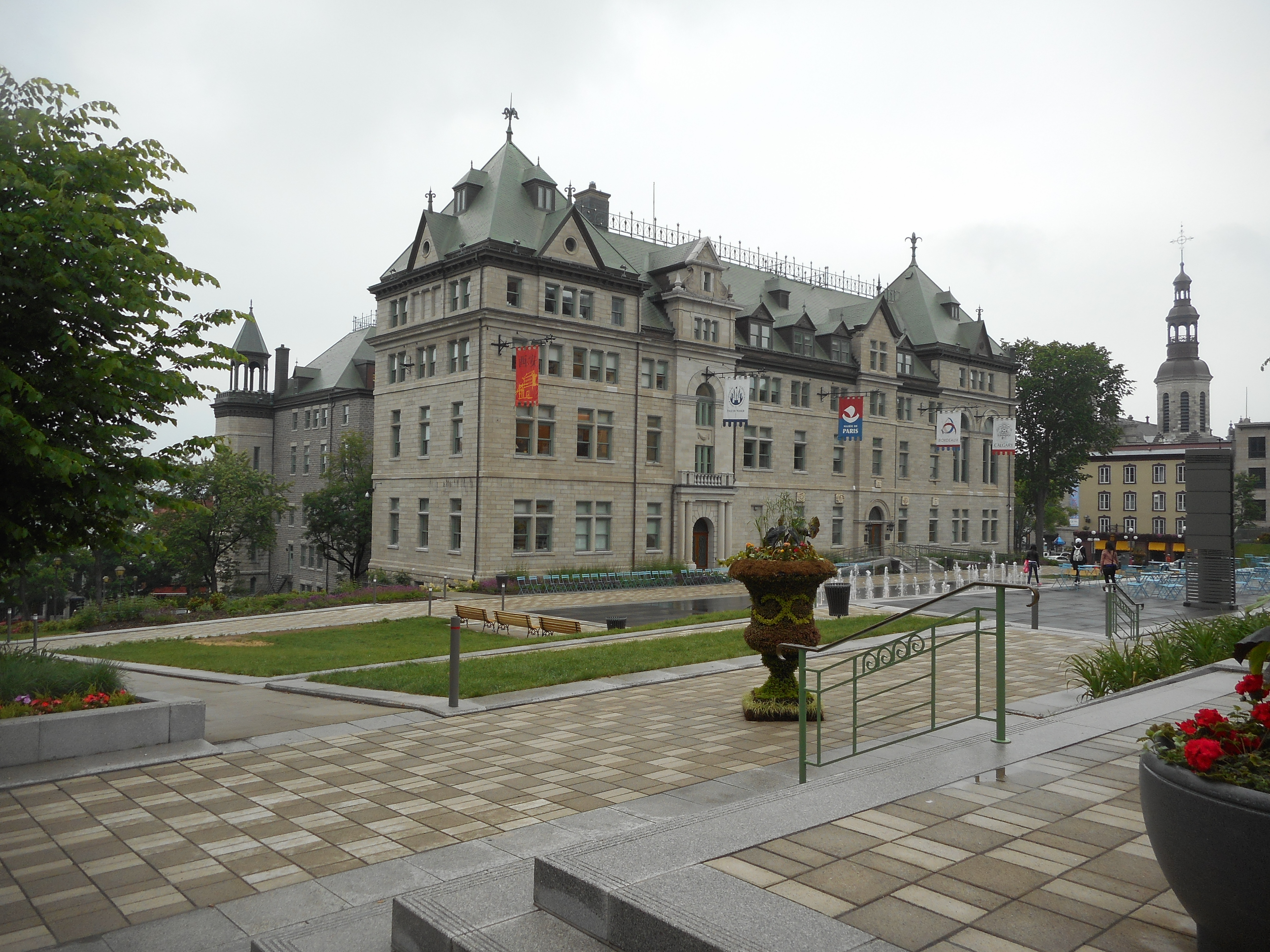
- Quebec City Hall
- Interactive map of the Quebec City Hall area

General information
- Location: 2, rue des Jardins; Quebec City, Quebec; G1R 4S9
- Coordinates: 46°48′50″N 71°12′29″W
- Inaugurated: 1896

Design and construction
- Architect: Georges-Émile Tanguay

National Historic Site of Canada
- Official name: Québec City Hall National Historic Site of Canada
- Designated: 1984
- Reference no.: 695

The City Hall of Quebec City (French: Hôtel de ville de Québec, pronounced [otɛl də vil də kebɛk]) is the seat of local government in Quebec City, Quebec, Canada. It was inaugurated on September 15, 1896 in the Old Quebec neighbourhood. The building slopes downward as it was built on a hill and was once home to the Jesuit College (Jesuit Barracks) from the 1730s to 1878.

The city hall was designated a National Historic Site of Canada in 1984. The building is also located within the "Arrondissement historique du Vieux-Québec" (Historic District of Old Quebec), a district that was designated under provincial heritage legislation in 1963 and listed as a World Heritage Site in 1985.

Located on rue des Jardins and designed by architect Georges-Émile Tanguay (1858-1923), it is the second permanent city hall for the old city. From 1842 to 1896 City Hall sat at home of British Army Major General William Dunn (British officer), son of former administrator Thomas Dunn (lieutenant-governor) (at rue Saint-Louis and rue Sainte-Ursule). Prior to 1842 the city government sat a various sites. The formal Quebec City Council was established in 1833.

The building used a mixture of Classical, Medieval and Châteauesque elements.

== See also ==
- List of Jesuit sites
- Montreal City Hall
