= List of historic buildings in Quebec City =

The following is a list of historic buildings in Quebec City, Quebec. The city's earliest structures originated from First Nations settlements, although the city's oldest standing structures originate from the French colony established in 1608 by Samuel de Champlain.

== List of historic buildings ==
The following is a list of historic buildings still standing in Quebec City.

Building	Year of completion	Builder	Source	Location	Image
Auberge Place d'Armes	1640	Martin Boutet			
Casemated Flank	1745	Gaspard-Joseph Chaussegros de Léry			
Chapelle des Ursulines	1642	Marie de l'Incarnation, Marie-Madeline de Chauvigny de la Peltrie			
Château du Domaine de Maizerets	1705	François Trefflé, Thomas Doyon de Simon Denys de la Trinité			
Château Frontenac	1898	Bruce Price			
Chateau de la Terrase Hotel					
Citadelle of Quebec	1820 and 1831	Royal Engineer and Lieutenant Colonel Elias Walker Durnford			
Esplanade Powder Magazine	1815	Royal Engineer			
Fortifications of Quebec City	17th Century; rebuilt 19th Century	Gaspard-Joseph Chaussegros de Léry (military engineer)			
Gare du Palais	1915	Harry Edward Prindle			
Jesuit Chapel	1820	François Baillairgé			
John Darlington building	1775				
Maison Chevalier	1752	mason Pierre Renaud			
Maison Jacquet	1675; rebuilt 1690				
Maison Routhier	1755	Pierre Belleau		Sainte-Foy	
Manège militaire de Québec	1885	Eugène-Étienne Taché			
Musée de l'Amérique française - formerly Québec Seminary	1663	Claude Baillif			
Notre-Dame de Québec Cathedral	1647, 1744–1749, 1766, interior 1786–1822; exterior 1843	Claude Baillif, Gaspard-Joseph Chaussegros de Léry (military engineer), Jean Baillairgé, François Baillairgé and Thomas Baillairgé			
Notre-Dame-des-Victoires Church	1687–1723	Jean Maillou			
Parliament Building	1877-1873	Eugène-Étienne Taché			
Porte Saint-Louis	1694 - rebuilt	Josué Dubois Berthelot de Beaucours			
Porte Kent	1879	Royal Engineer			
Porte Saint Jean	1694 rebuilt	Josué Dubois Berthelot de Beaucours			
St. Andrew's Church	1810				
Saint-Jean-Baptiste Church	1885	Joseph-Ferdinand Peachy			
Saint-Dominique Church	1930	Joseph-Albert LaRue			

== List of ruins ==
The following is a list of ruins of historic buildings in Quebec City.

Building	Year of completion	Builder	Source	Location	Image
Chateau Saint-Louis	1648, 1694, 1719, 1723	Charles Huault de Montmagny, Louis de Buade de Frontenac, Gaspard-Joseph Chaussegros de Léry			
