= Baillairgé =

Baillairgé may refer to:

- Charles Baillairgé
- François Baillairgé
- George-Frédéric-Théophile Baillairgé
- Jean Baillairgé
- Louis de Gonzague Baillairgé
- Pierre-Florent Baillairgé
- Thomas Baillairgé
