= Lemire =

Lemire or LeMire is a surname. Notable people with the surname include:

- Alexxis Lemire (born 1996), American actress and model
- Ariane Mahrÿke Lemire, Canadian singer
- Chris Lemire (born 1983), Canadian soccer player
- Christy Lemire (born 1972), American flim critic journalist
- Clarence P. LeMire (1886–1961), judge of the United States Tax Court
- Francine Lemire, Canadian cross-country skier
- Jean Lemire (1625—1685), master carpenter and syndic
- Jean-Baptiste Lemire (1867-1945), French composer
- Jeff Lemire (born 1976), Canadian cartoonist
- Jonathan Lemire (born 1979), American journalist and political commentator
- Jules Auguste Lemire (1853-1928), French priest and social reformer
- Karima Lemire (born 1998), Canadian soccer player
- Mackenzie Lemire (Born Kingsville, Ontario), Canadian drag performer
- Marc Lemire (born 1975), Canadian neo-Nazi
- Marc-Antoine Lemire (born 1990), Canadian flim director
- Margot Lemire (1946-2024), Canadian poet and playwright
- Maxim Lemire (born 1982), Canadian strongman and professional wrestler
- Norbert Lemire (1949-2025), Canadian painter
- Sébastien Lemire, Canadian politician
- Vincent Lemire (born 1973), French historian
- Yvon Lemire (born 1939), Canadian politician

== Middle Name ==
- Lola Lemire Tostevin (born 1937), Canadian poet and novelist
