= Musée de l'Amérique francophone =

Museum in Quebec City, Canada

Coordinates: 46°48′51″N 71°12′24″W

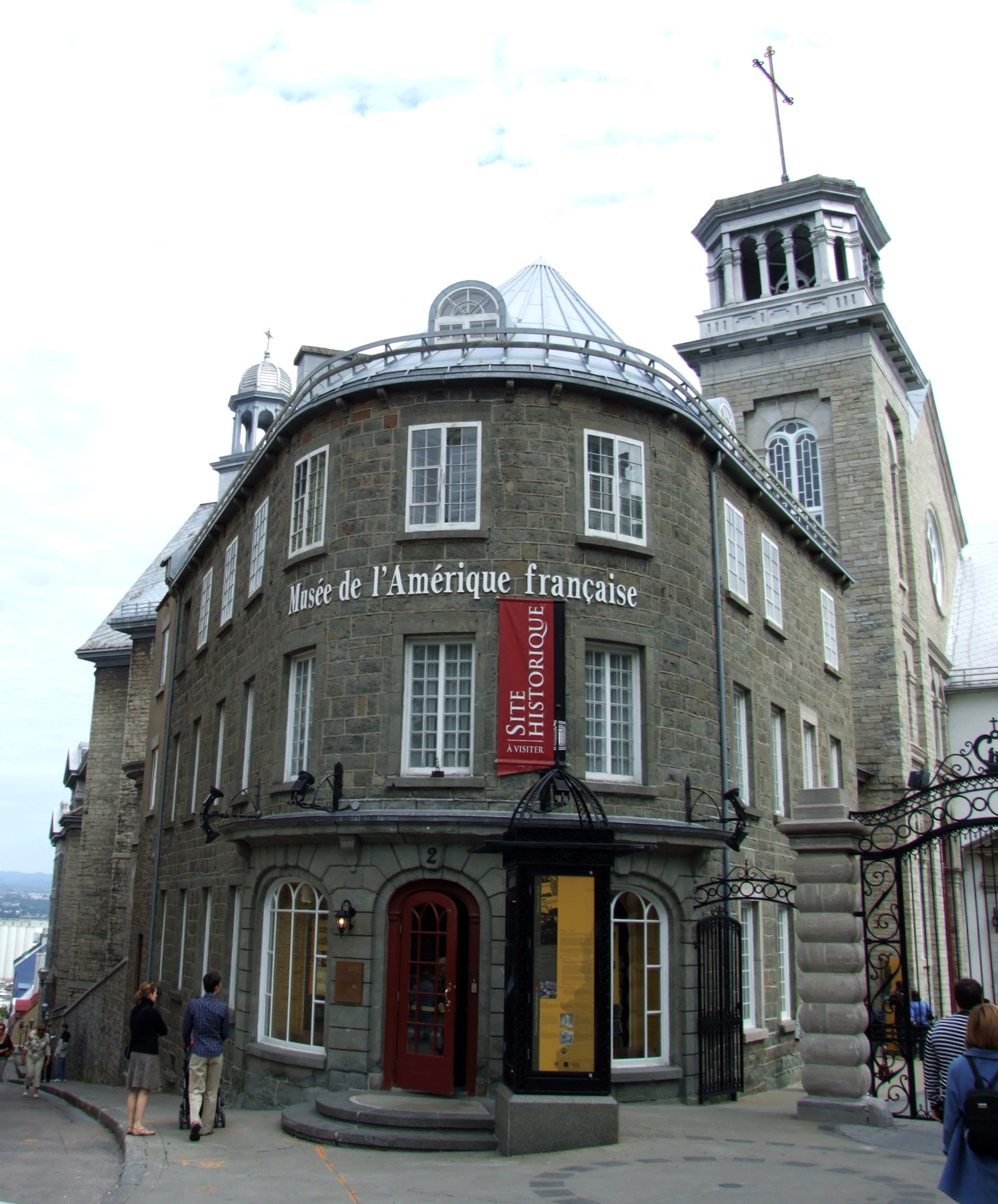
- Established: 22 October 1806
- Location: 2, côte de la Fabrique; Quebec City, Quebec; G1R 3V6
- Type: National Historic Site of Canada
- Website: www.mcq.org

The Musée de l'Amérique francophone (Museum of French-Speaking America), formerly the Musée de l'Amérique française, is situated in the Old Quebec neighbourhood of Quebec City, Quebec, Canada. It is Canada's oldest museum. Its collection contains books from Séminaire de Québec's library, some of which were published in the 16th century and others which were placed in a restricted section called Enfer ('Hell' in French). It also contains artifacts from Cyprus, paintings, first-edition publications of The Birds of America and Encyclopédie, and a recreation of the organ from Cathedral-Basilica of Notre-Dame de Québec. The museum's collection has been managed by the Musée de la civilisation since 1995.

== History ==
The museum opened on 22 October 1806 as Musée du Séminaire and is the oldest museum in Canada. In 1993, Musée du Séminaire changed its name to Musée de l'Amérique française. In 1995, the museum became part of the Musée de la civilisation. In 2013 the museum was renamed to Musée de l'Amérique francophone as part of Musée de la civilisation's campaign to modernise its image.

== Facilities ==
The museum is located beside Séminaire de Québec in Quebec City. In 1838, Thomas Baillairgé created blueprints for the museum's building, including its round facade. The former chapel, called Chapelle du Musée de l'Amérique francophone, is attached to the building. It is designated as a religious heritage site and now serves as a conference centre and hall. The museum is part of the Musée de la civilisation complex.

== Collection ==
In 1991, the museum documented about 110,000 pieces in its collection. When the museum opened, it contained objects that helped in science education. The collection also contains coins, stamps, fossils, paintings, statues, prints, books, gold and silverware.

The museum's archives were listed in Memory of the World Register in 2007. Some of the museum's archives and rare books are located at the French America Reference Centre within the museum.

The collection includes artifacts from Cyprus, with 40 pieces donated by Jean Des Gagniers in 1966 and 60 donated by Louis-Albert Vachon in 1991. The artifacts are from the Neolithic to the Medieval periods and include items made from ceramic materials and a sculpture.

The museum has paintings by Joseph Légaré, Marc-Aurèle de Foy Suzor-Coté and Jean Paul Lemieux. It also contains a four-volume copy of the first edition of The Birds of America by John James Audubon and a copy of Encyclopédie. A copy of the first book of hours produced by Henri III of France for his confraternity is also in the museum's collection.

In 2009 Juget-Sinclair built a chapel organ for the museum. The organ is a reconstruction of the organ built for the Cathedral-Basilica of Notre-Dame de Québec in 1753, but destroyed in 1759. It was installed on the museum's balcony at the second floor of the building's interior.

=== Enfer section ===
In 1964, when Université Laval moved to the Quebec City neighbourhood of Sainte-Foy–Sillery–Cap-Rouge, the university split Séminaire de Québec and donated all pre-1920 books and books from the collection's forbidden section, known as Enfer (Inferno), to the museum. The collection contains 603 monographs, mostly printed in the 18th and 19th centuries. About half of the monographs are printed in French, a quarter in English and the remaining in other languages. The collection also contains over 900 leaflets and brochures. These books include texts from the 16th century and the accounts of explorers from the 17th and 18th centuries. Some of the books contain notes written by members of Séminaire de Québec explaining why the book was placed in the Enfer section. Some of the Enfer books contain redactions, erasures, ink stains, and explanations of the book's errors. The collection also contains letters from bishops or religious leaders that reject or grant permission for people to read the Enfer books.

== Exhibitions ==
- L'Œuvre du Séminaire de Québec
- Partir sur la route des francophones (On the Road: The Francophone Odyssey): an exhibit on the French-speaking people who emigrated from Acadia, St. Lawrence River, and Louisiana, to other parts of North America.
- Révélations, l'art pour comprendre le monde: a fine arts exhibit, created in 2013 to celebrate Séminaire de Québec's 350th anniversary.
