= Louis de Gonzague Baillairgé =

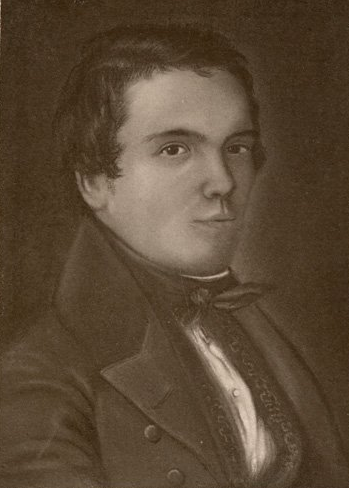
- Born: February 18, 1808; Quebec City, Lower Canada
- Died: March 20, 1896 (aged 88); Quebec City, Quebec
- Occupations: Lawyer, businessman, and philanthropist

Louis de Gonzague Baillairgé (18 February 1808 – 20 March 1896) was the son of Pierre-Florent Baillairgé and grandson of Jean Baillairgé. A descendant of a family distinguished by several illustrious figures in the fields of wood-carving and architecture, he chose instead to go into law.

Baillairgé received his classical studies at the Petit Séminaire de Québec and, in 1830, was articled to Philippe Panet and later to René-Édouard Caron. He and Caron formed a partnership in 1844 and it became extremely successful. Baillairgé became very wealthy and well known for his philanthropy. From the 1870s on, he assisted many individuals, groups and religious communities.
