= Norbert Lemire =

Canadian painter (1949–2025)

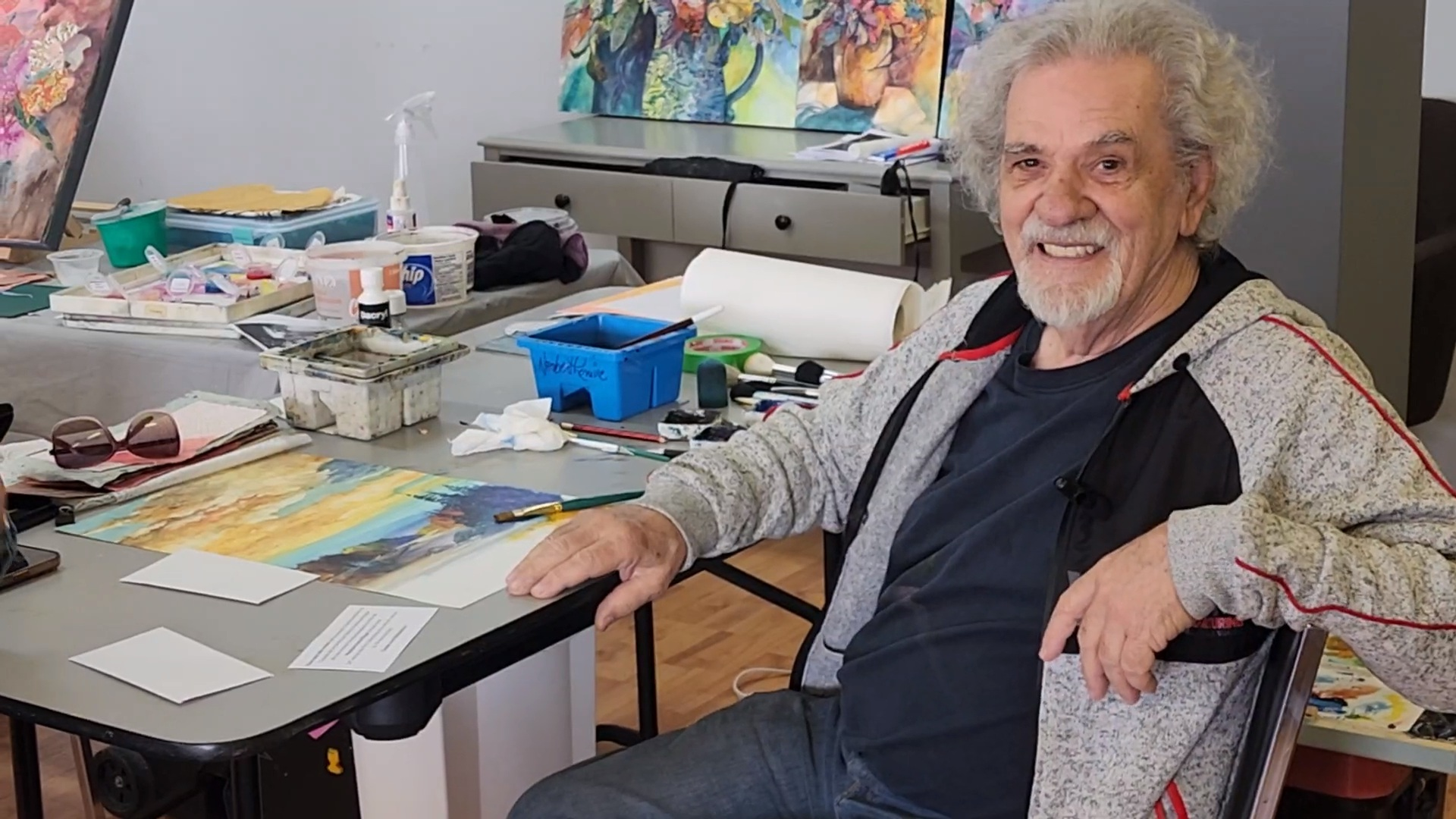
- Lemire in 2024
- Born: 4 March 1949; Poularies, Quebec, Canada
- Died: 10 September 2025 (aged 76)
- Education: Université du Québec à Montréal
- Occupation: Painter
- Relatives: Margot Lemire (sister)

Norbert Lemire (4 March 1949 – 10 September 2025) was a Canadian watercolor painter.

== Early life and career ==
Norbert Lemire was born in Poularies on 4 March 1949. From the ages of 16 to 19, Lemire worked at the Wasamac mine. Around age 23, he became a layout designer for the Rouyn-Noranda-based newspaper La Frontière.

In the 1980s, Lemire was offered a management position at Éditions Québecor, a new publishing company. He declined the offer, opting to paint instead. In 1981, he started painting full-time and held his first solo exhibition. He completed his apprenticeship with Jean-Paul Ladouceur at Studio Balaquar in Laval.

From 1984 to 1986, he studied visual arts at the Université du Québec à Montréal. From 1985 to 1986, he was an illustrator for the magazine Sentier Chasse-Pêche.

From 1993 to 1996, he designed and modeled puppets for the Radio-Canada show Fred & cie.

In 1996, 100,000 copies of a bookmark Lemire designed were purchased by libraries in Outaouais.

== Personal life and death ==
Lemire was the brother of Canadian poet Margot Lemire.

He had three children, including Julie and Charlotte, who are also painters.

Lemire died on 10 September 2025, at the age of 76.
