= John Darlington Building =

Building in Quebec City, Canada

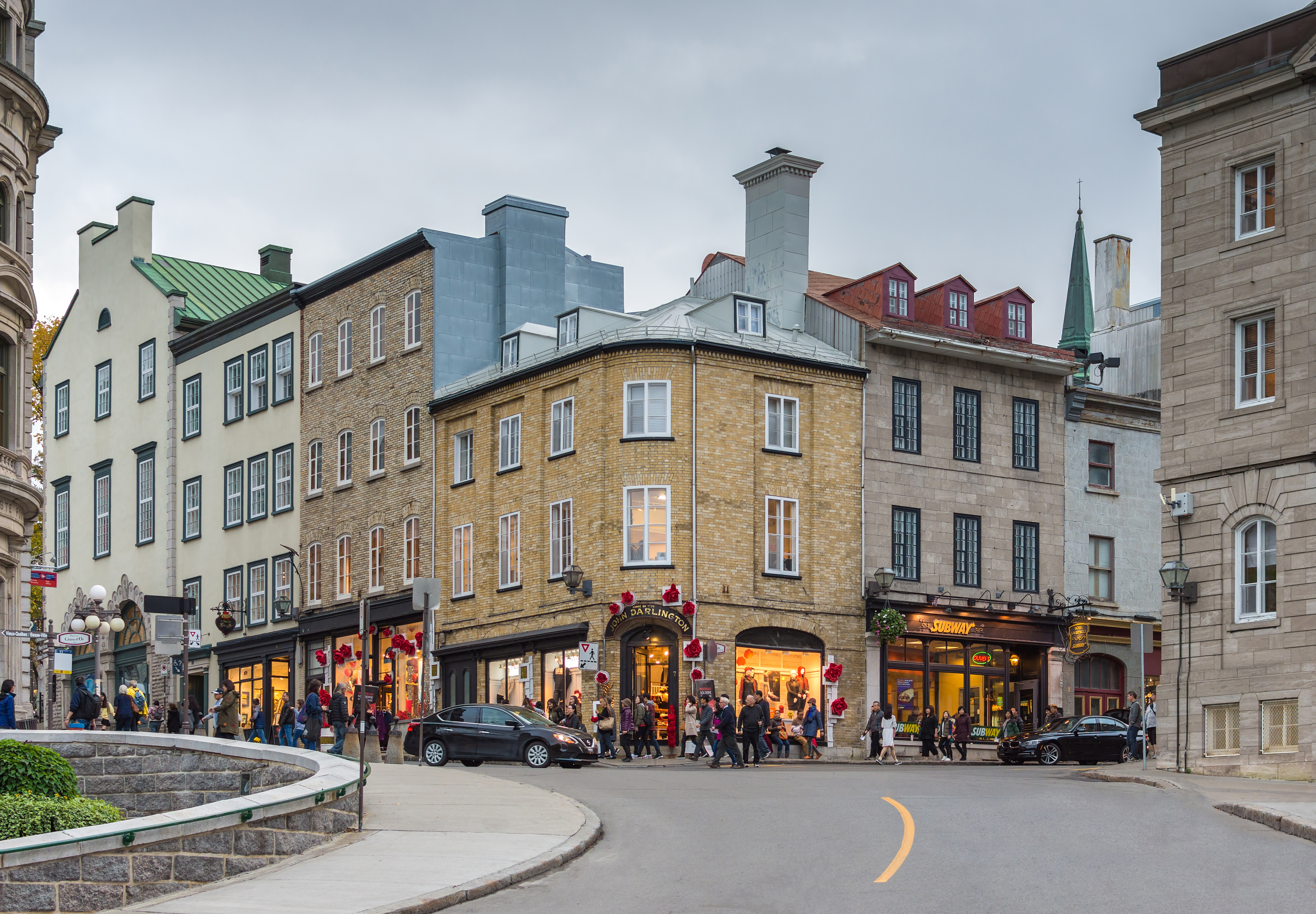
- Interactive map of the John Darlington Building area

General information
- Location: Quebec City, Quebec, Canada, 7 Rue de Baude
- Coordinates: 46.81341639°N 71.2054397°W
- Completed: 1775 (251 years ago)

Technical details
- Floor count: 4

The John Darlington Building (French: Bâtiment John Darlington) is the oldest commercial building in Quebec City, Quebec, Canada. Located at 7 Rue de Buade, at its junction with Rue du Fort, it was built in 1775 for merchant tailor John Darlington.

== Gallery ==
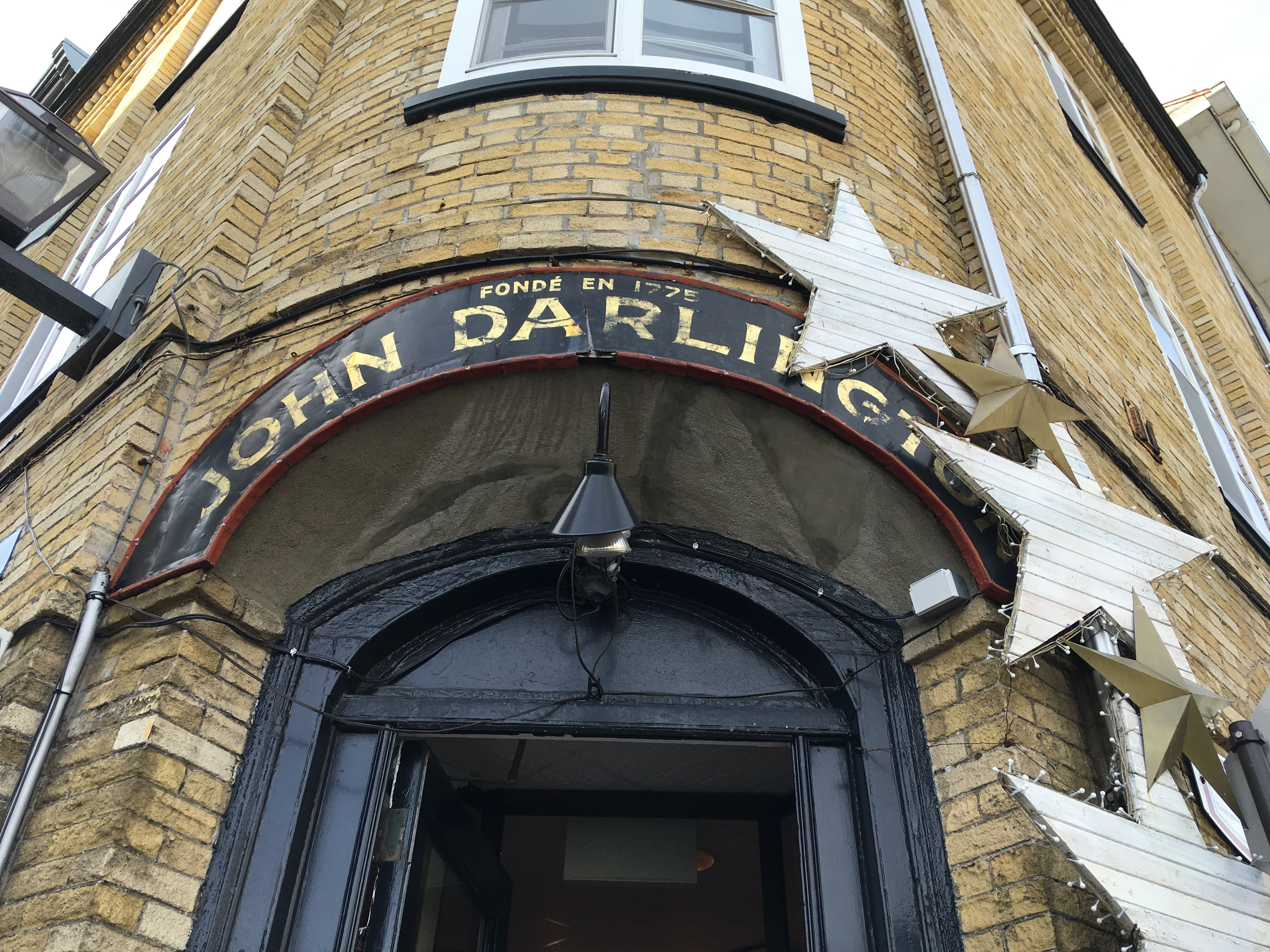
Doorway detail

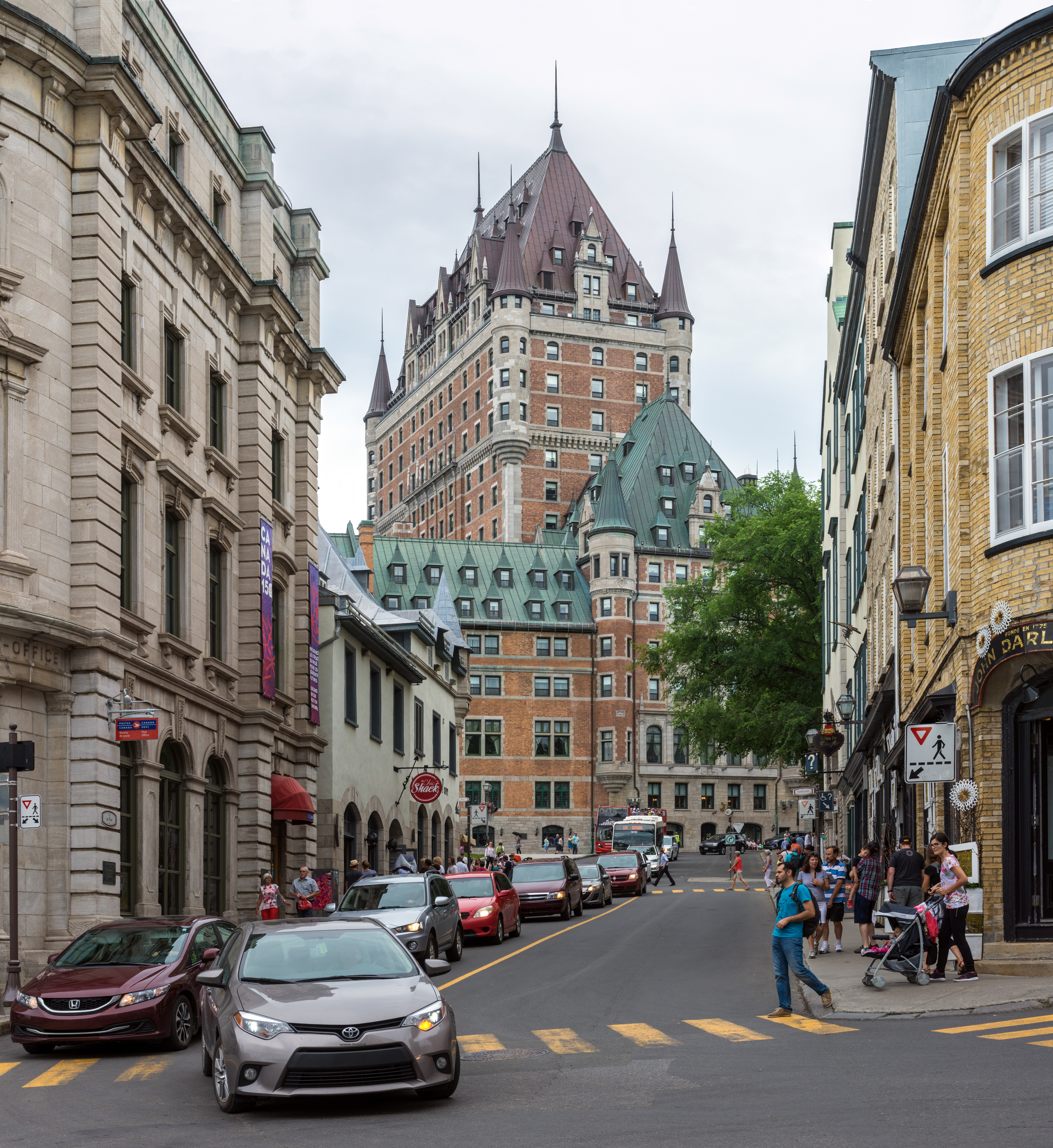
The Château Frontenac is located a block south of the building. The two are separated by Place d'Armes

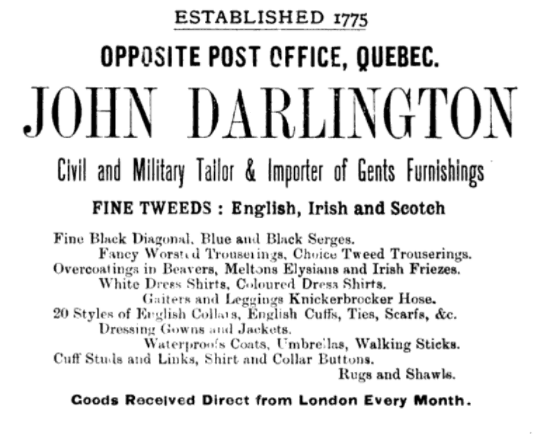
An advertisement for business shortly after its establishment
