= Jesuit Chapel (Quebec City) =

Coordinates: 46.812134°N 71.212265°W

- Chapelle des Jésuites
- Chapelle des Jésuites in 2026

- Location within Quebec City
- Location: 20, rue Dauphine; Quebec City, Quebec; G1R 3W8
- Country: Canada
- Denomination: Catholic Church

History
- Status: Active
- Founded: November 9, 1817
- Dedication: Canadian Martyrs

Architecture
- Functional status: Chapel of ease
- Architect: François Baillairgé
- Groundbreaking: 1818
- Completed: 1930

Specifications
- Capacity: 216
- Materials: Wood and stone

Administration
- Archdiocese: Archdiocese of Quebec
- Parish: Notre-Dame de Québec

The Jesuit Chapel is a chapel of the Society of Jesus located in the Old Quebec neighbourhood of Quebec City, Quebec, Canada. It was designed by François Baillairgé and built in from 1818 to 1930. It is situated on Rue Dauphine in Old Quebec close to the ramparts of Quebec City.

== History ==
=== Foundation ===
After the suppression of the Jesuits on 21 July 1773, the Bishop of Quebec Jean-Olivier Briand allowed the Jesuits to remain Quebec. However, the government refused to allow the Jesuits to have any new members and would not allow any new French priests to come to Canada. This meant that the number of Jesuits reduced as their members died. The last Canadian Jesuit, Fr. Jean-Joseph Casot, died at Quebec in 1800.

Since the Jesuits were no longer present in Quebec, the Jesuit College, Quebec was run by the Notre-Dame-de-Québec Congregation. On 9 November 1817, they received approval from Archbishop Joseph-Octave Plessis to build a new chapel.

=== Construction ===
The chapel was designed by François Baillairgé. It was built on the former grounds of the Jesuit College. Construction started in 1818 and completed in 1820. It was expanded in 1857, and a new facade was added in 1930. The main altar was built in 1888 by Eugène Taché and the windows were created in 1916 by Bernard Leonard.

Initially, the chapel was served by priests from the Notre-Dame Basilica-Cathedral In 1842, the Jesuits returned to Quebec. In 1856, the Jesuits moved into a house near to the chapel. In 1907, the chapel was given over to the Jesuits. In 1949, the chancel was altered and statues and relics of the Canadian Martyrs were installed. The chapel was then dedicated to the Canadian Martyrs.

In 1992, the Maison Dauphine, a centre for homeless youth, was established next to the chapel. In the 2010s, this closed and a new charity was established on the ground floor, below the chapel. It is called Carrefour d'Action Interculturelle and works to improve the standard of living of migrants when they arrive in Quebec.

== Gallery ==
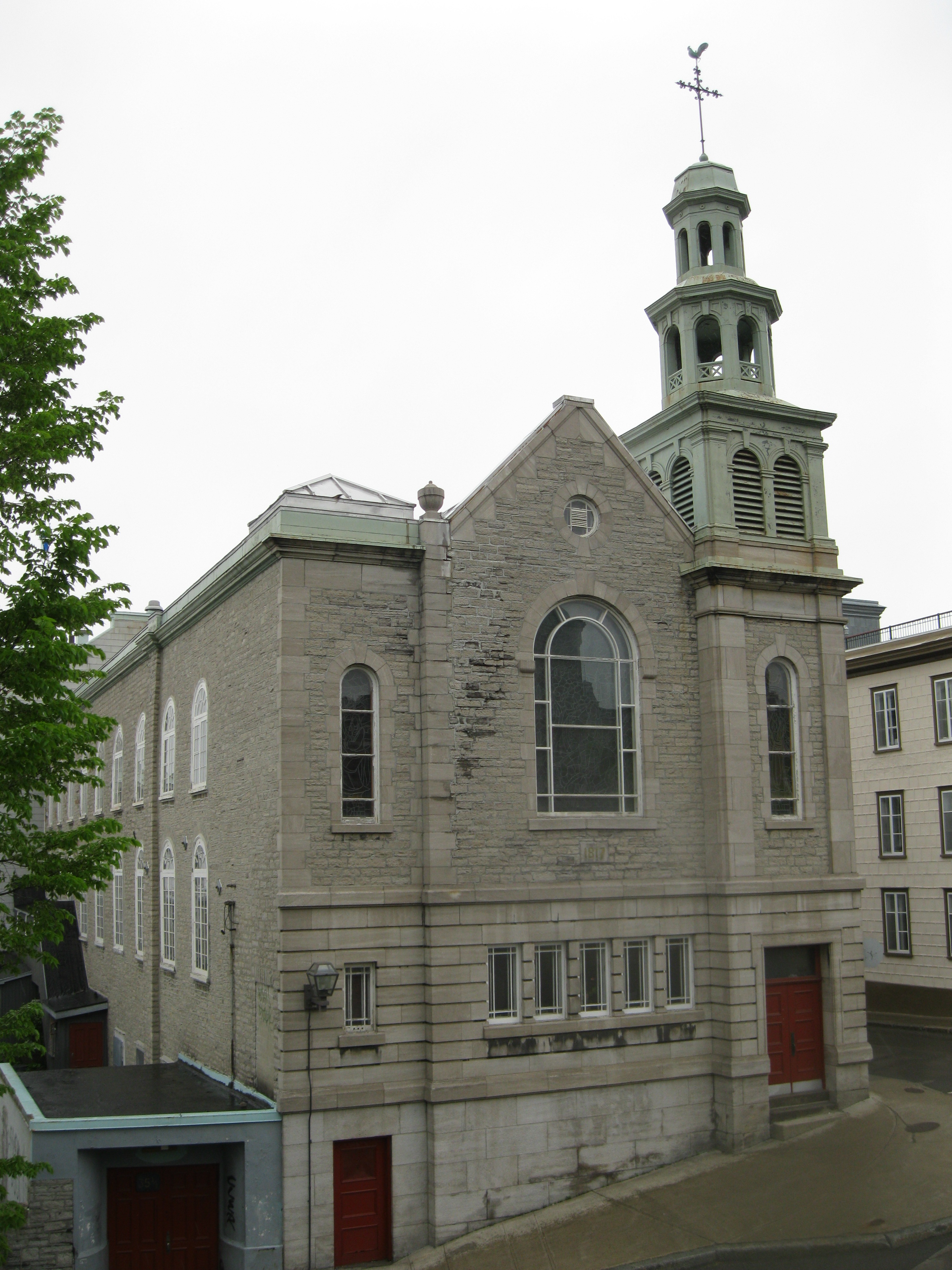
Front of the chapel

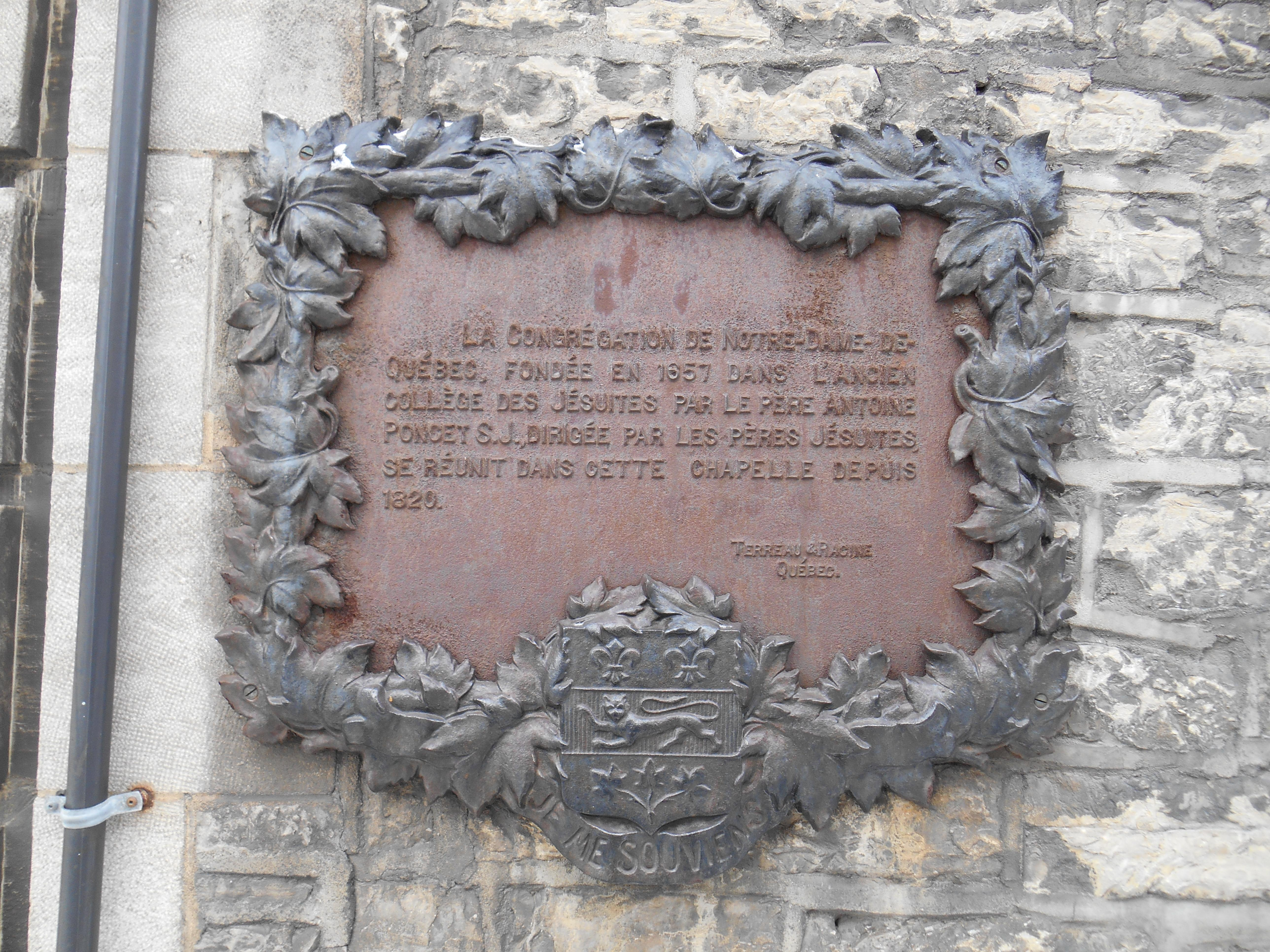
Plaque on the side wall

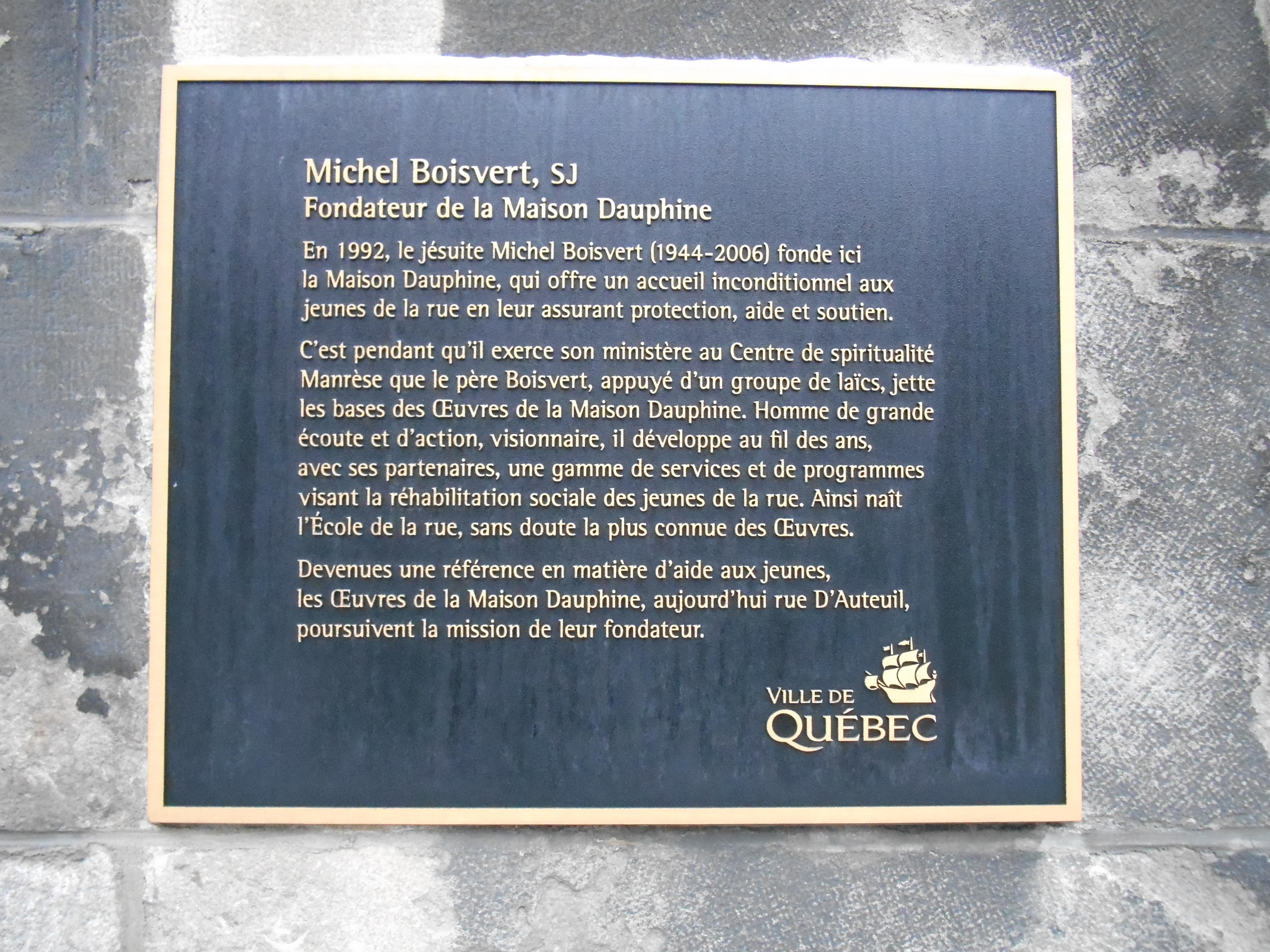
Ville de Québec plaque

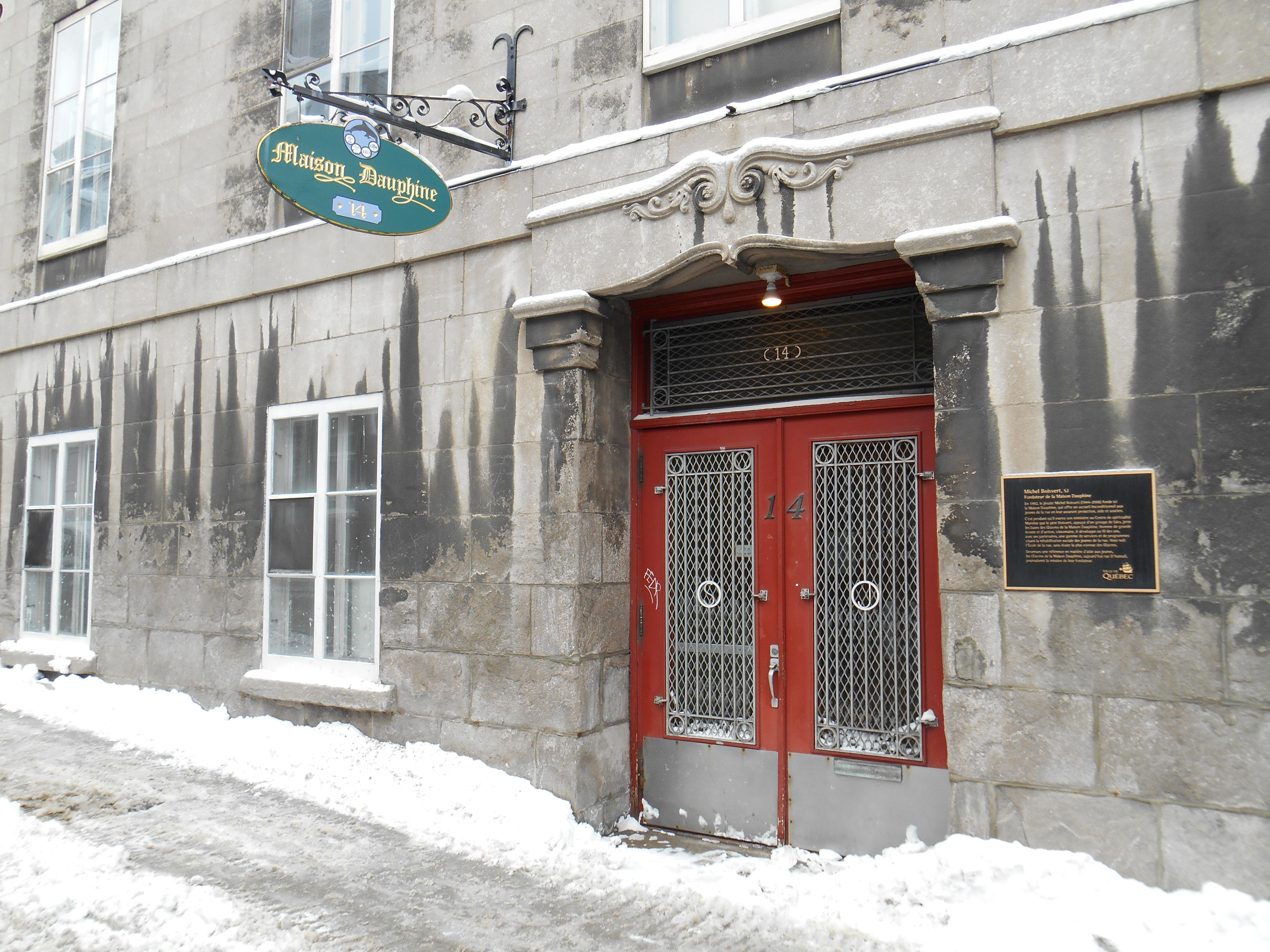
Maison Dauphine entrance

== See also ==
- List of Jesuit sites
- Society of Jesus
