= George-Frédéric-Théophile Baillairgé =

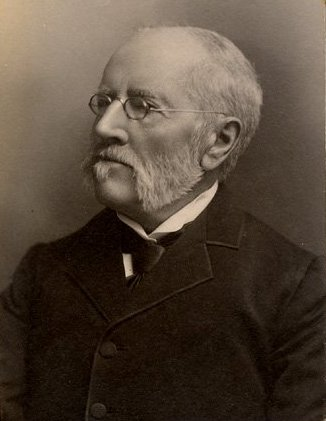
- Born: 16 October 1824; Quebec City, Lower Canada
- Died: 7 December 1909 (aged 85); Joliette, Quebec
- Occupations: civil servant, surveyor, engineer, and author

George-Frédéric-Théophile Baillairgé (16 October 1824 – 7 December 1909) was a civil servant, surveyor, engineer and author from a family that traced its roots in Lower Canada to Jean Baillairgé. He had a good education, was fluently bilingual and studied law for a year before deciding on a different career path.

Frédéric became a civil servant in 1844, taking a drafting position with the Board of Works, working as an assistant to Frederick Preston Rubidge. He was to be in public works for 46 years. He quickly became a land surveyor and took on translation responsibilities. He wrote extensively for this position, compiling important details of public works history.

As his engineering career progressed he was involved in numerous and diverse public works projects including a number designed by his brother, Charles.

His career is a testament to his technical expertise and the importance of public works in building the prosperity of the country during that era.

== Works ==
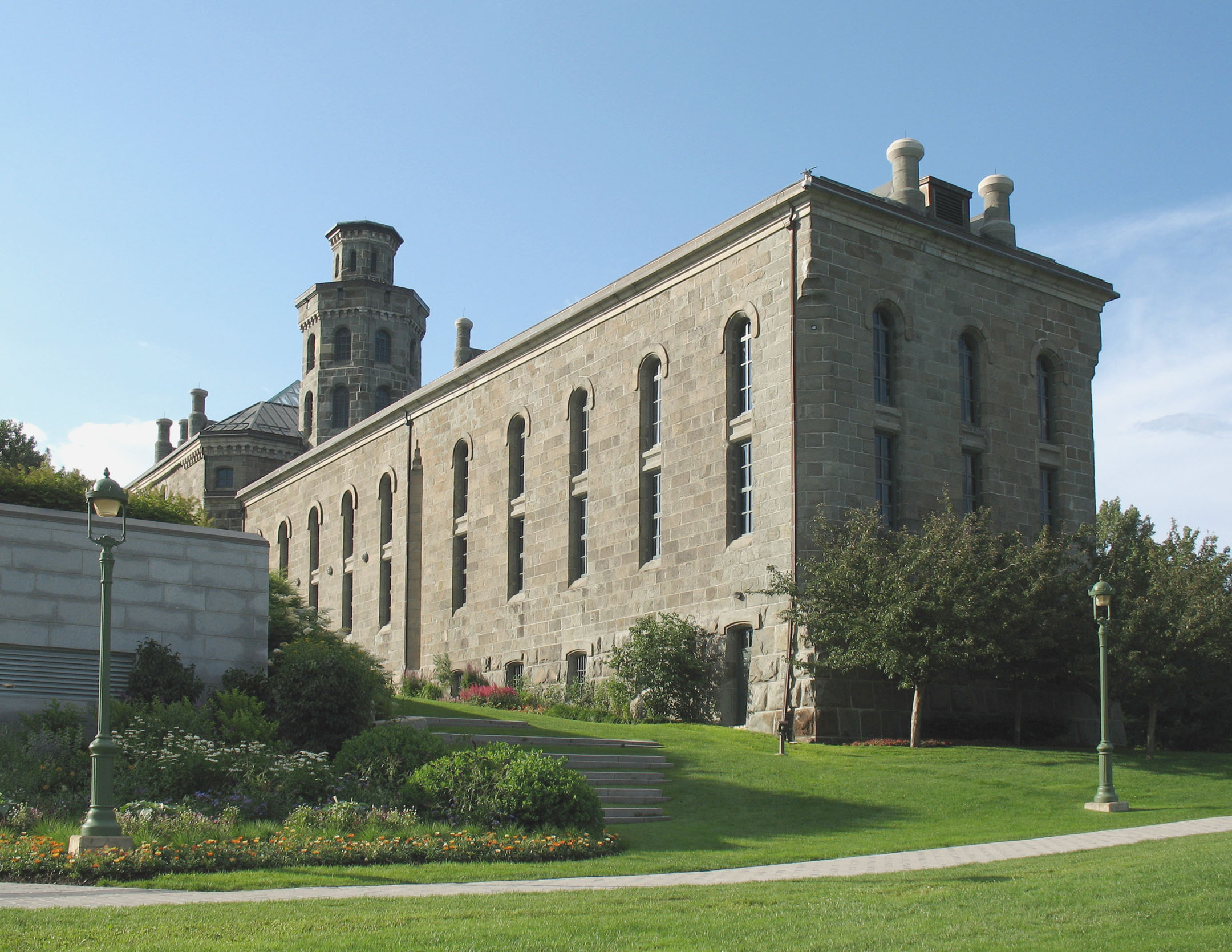
Musée national des beaux-arts du Québec, Pavillon Charles Baillairgé, ancienne prison de Québec, Québec, Québec

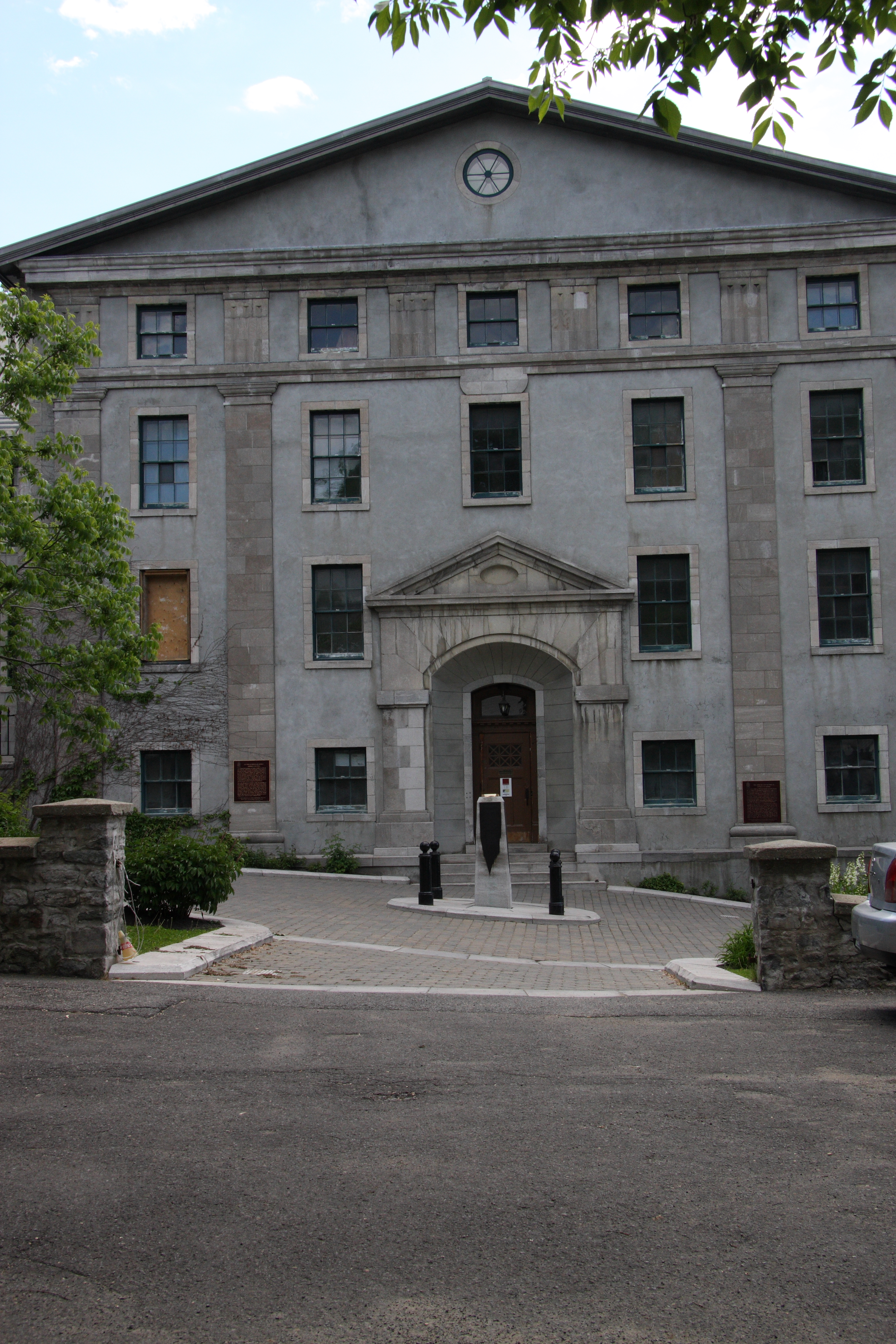
The old prison of Québec designed by François Baillairgé and constructed between 1808 and 1814,
