= Charles Baillairgé =

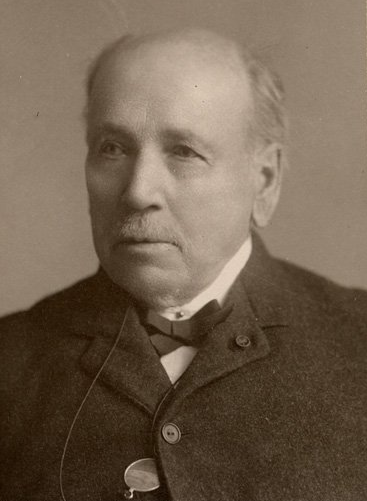
- Born: September 29, 1826; Quebec City, Lower Canada
- Died: May 10, 1906 (aged 79); Quebec City, Quebec, Canada
- Occupations: architect, land surveyor, civil engineer, and author

Charles Baillairgé (29 September 1826 – 10 May 1906) was an architect, land surveyor, civil engineer, and an author.

He was from a long line of sculptors, painters, and architects that began with his great grandfather, Jean Baillairgé. He was involved in designing many projects that were under the supervision of his brother, Frédéric, who held a senior position with public works. He completed the neoclassical stone building for the Academy of Music (Music Hall) on rue Saint-Louis in Quebec city in 1853.

Charles Baillairgé and Thomas Fuller (architect) completed work in 1866 as the principal architects on the Parliament of Canada in Ottawa, Ontario, Canada.

Three of Baillairgé's works have been designated as National Historic Sites of Canada due to their remarkable architecture. The Bon-Pasteur Chapel (1868), a rectangular five-storey stone-faced chapel with a gable roof is part of the motherhouse of the Sisters of the Good Shepherd in Quebec City, designed by Charles Baillairgé, was designated a National Historic Site in 1975 as an outstanding example of religious architecture in Quebec. Baillairgé's Têtu House (1854), a three-storey, stone townhouse designed in the Neoclassical style by Charles Baillairgé in the same city was designated a National Historic Site in 1973 as one of the most remarkable examples of a Neoclassical townhouse built in Canada during the mid-19th century. The Church of Sainte-Marie (1859) in Sainte-Marie was designated in 2006 due to the unique interiors designed by Baillairgé.

Charles Philippe Ferdinand Baillairgé designed a Roman Catholic church and sacristy, 1849 in Beauport, Quebec. He designed a Roman Catholic church in St. Elzear, Quebec 1852. He designed a Roman Catholic church 1853-7 in L'Isle Verte, Quebec. He designed Eglise Ste. Marie, 1854 in Ste-Marie, Quebec. He designed a Roman Catholic church, 1854–56 in St. Romuald, Quebec. He designed Eglise St. Patrice, 1855–57 in Riviere-Du-Loup, Quebec, which burned in 1883, and was rebuilt. He designed a Roman Catholic church, 1861 in Ste. Marguerite, Quebec. With Joseph F. Peachy, Baillairgé designed the interiors for a Roman Catholic church, Ile d'Orleans, 1863 in St. Laurent, Quebec. He designed a private chapel (1886) at his summer residence; now relocated at La Guadeloupe, Frontenac Co. In 1889, he restored the Breakneck Stairs in Quebec City, the city's oldest stairway.

== Works ==
Building	Year Completed	Builder	Style	Location	Image
Eglise St. Roch, addition of two steeples to the church designed by Thomas Baillairgé	1841	Charles Baillairgé		St. Joseph Street, Quebec, Quebec	
Eglise St. Jean Baptiste, 1847 interior decorations, 1854; addition of two bell towers, 1857; presbytery, 1858	1847	Charles Baillairgé		St. Jean Street, Quebec, Quebec	
central pavilion, Laval University, University Street,	1854–56	Charles Baillairgé		Quebec, Quebec	
Notre Dame Roman Catholic Basilica, cast-iron fence and gates	1857	Charles Baillairgé		Market Square	
Musée national des beaux-arts du Québec, Pavillon Charles-Baillairgé; ancienne prison de Québec		Charles Baillairgé		Québec, Québec	
Langevin Block, Parliament Hill		Charles Baillairgé & Thomas Fuller (architect)		Ottawa, Ontario	
Library of Parliament, Parliament Hill		Charles Baillairgé & Thomas Fuller (architect)		Ottawa, Ontario	
House of Parliament		Charles Baillairgé & Thomas Fuller (architect)		Ottawa, Ontario	

== External ==
- Historic Places in Canada
