= Bistro 1640 =

Restaurant in Quebec City, Canada

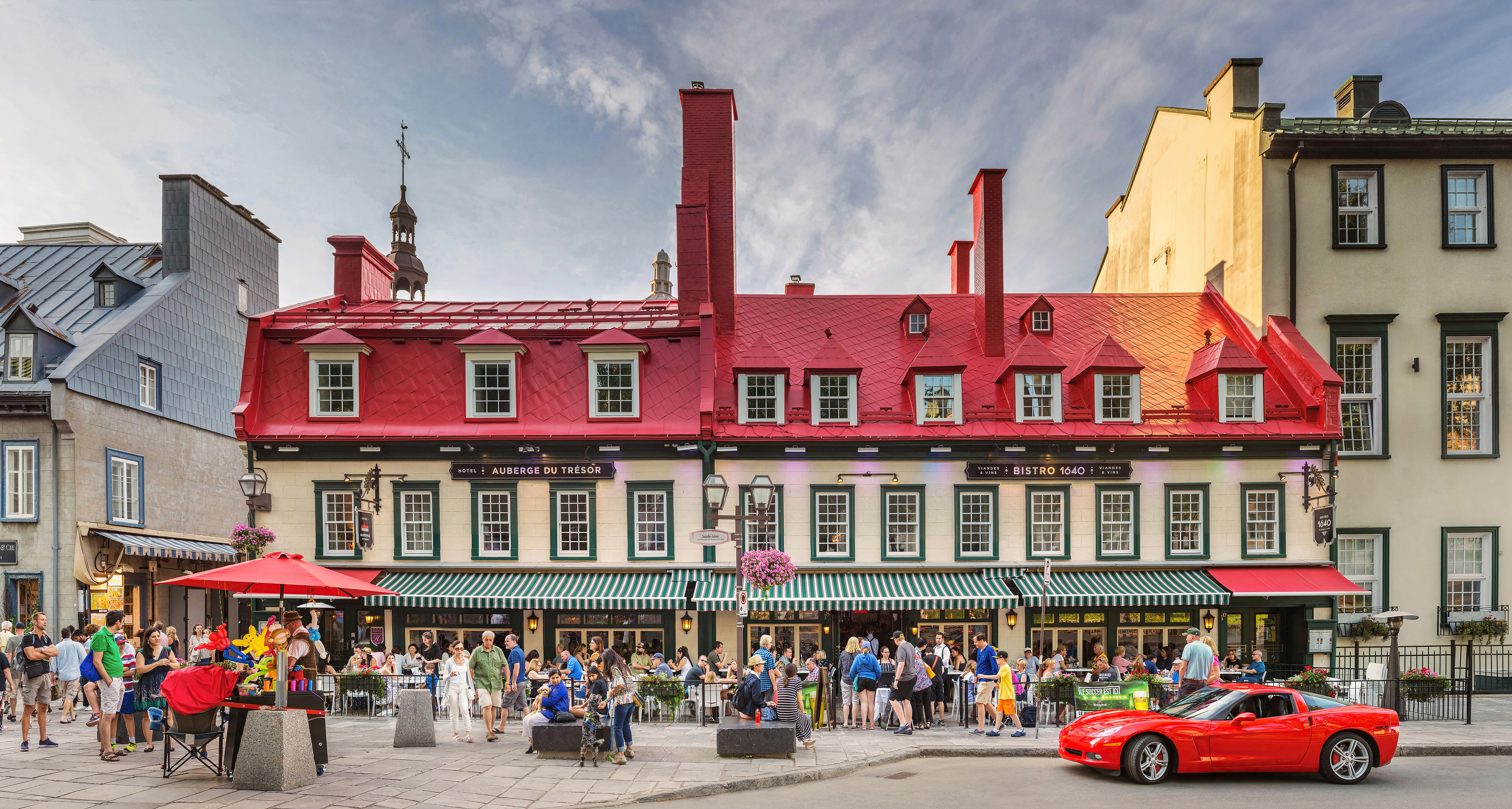
- The building in 2017, viewed from Place d'Armes
- Interactive map of the Bistro 1640 area

General information
- Location: Quebec City, Quebec, Canada, Rue Saint-Anne
- Coordinates: 46.8130°N 71.2058°W
- Current tenants: Bistro 1640
- Completed: 1640 (386 years ago)

Technical details
- Floor count: 3

Bistro 1640 is a restaurant located in a historic 17th-century building in Quebec City, Quebec, Canada. Situated on Rue Saint-Anne, it is located across Place d'Armes from the Château Frontenac.

== Building ==
The restaurant is located on the ground floor of the Auberge Place d'Armes, which was built for Guillaume Couillard, one of the first French settlers, in 1620. The building is divided into two sections: a French side (built by Martin Boutet and adjacent to Rue du Trésor) and an English side (built in 1853 to a design by Edward Stavely). The French style is visible in century-old stones and exposed beams, while the English style, which was inspired by George Richard Renfrew, contains brick and woodwork.

The upper two floors consist of the rooms of the Auberge du Trésor hotel.
