= Jean Lemire =

Jean Lemire (1625—1685) was a master carpenter and a syndic of Quebec City, and is the ancestor of most Lemires living in Canada. His father and mother, Mathurin LeMire and Jeanne Vannier, lived in the Saint Vivien district of Rouen, Province of Normandy. Rouen is a port on the Seine river. Jean Lemire was baptized in the Saint Vivien church June 4, 1625. He was a carpenter by trade.

Jean Lemire crossed the Atlantic Ocean between 1650 and 1653. He married Louise Marsolet, daughter of Nicolas Marsolet of Saint-Aignan and Marie Barbier, and thereby entered one of the most important families of Canada (New France).

In 1664, Jean Lemire was elected syndic of Quebec City following the resignation of the mayor and two councilors. He was reelected syndic in 1667.

In 1667, the couple decided to establish themselves at Cap-Rouge, Quebec City. By then, they owned ten acres (40,000 m^{2}) of land and five cattle, and they employed three servants.

By 1684, the master carpenter was in high esteem throughout the region. He was assigned the construction of the steeple in Cathedral-Basilica of Notre-Dame de Québec, a structure of Batiscan oak, designed to crown the south tower of the cathedral.

Nine months later, on October 5, 1684, he died at fifty-nine years old. Louise outlived her husband until 1712.
