= Margot Lemire =

Canadian poet and playwright (1946–2024)

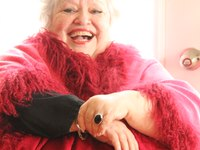
- Lemire in 2017
- Born: Marguerite Lemire; 17 December 1946; Poularies, Quebec, Canada
- Died: 10 March 2024 (aged 77); Amos, Quebec, Canada
- Occupation(s): Poet; Playwright

Marguerite "Margot" Lemire (17 December 1946 – 10 March 2024) was a Canadian writer, poet, and playwright.

== Biography ==
Born in Poularies on 17 December 1946, Lemire taught French in secondary school before becoming a union activist. She was also a lecturer at the Université du Québec en Abitibi-Témiscamingue. After fifteen years of teaching, she devoted herself to writing and social work. She became general director of the Corporation de développement communautaire d’Amos-région and worked at the Conseil régional de développement de l’Abitibi-Témiscamingue. In 2002, she sat on the implementation committee of the Réseau livre savoir. She published three collections of poetry as well as several theatre pieces and various books. She took part in poetry readings in Abitibi-Témiscamingue and attended the Salon du livre de l'Abitibi-Témiscamingue.

Lemire moved to La Motte, where her community involvement included the foundation of the cultural organization La Pariole in 1994. The following year, she co-founded Show de La Motte. She continued writing her texts and poems throughout the next decades. A tribute was paid to her at the 25th edition of the Show de La Motte in April 2023. In 2012, her text, titled La Motte, mon village en Abitibi, won the first edition of the Mon village, c’est le meilleur! competition, organized by the magazine Vivre à la campagne. In April 2023, the Ensemble Aiguebelle organized a concert titled Les Chants de mes déparlures inspired by her works.

Margot Lemire died in Amos on 10 March 2024, at the age of 77.

== Works ==
=== Poetry ===
- Déparlures (1986)
- La Porte intime
- Mon cœur jamais (1990)
- La Semeuse de perles (2017)

=== Chronicles ===
- Les Mots qu’on relit (1989)

=== Collective works ===
- Nos Saisons (2011)
- Contes, légendes et récits de l’Abitibi-Témiscamingue (2012)
- Amos littéraire, un parfum de centenaire (2014)

=== Theatre pieces ===
- Lover time (1980)
- Les malheureuses (1985)
- La terre n'est que le chemin (2002)

=== Other texts ===
- Comme un vol d’outardes vers l’an 2000 (1990)
- Les 100 ans du Steinway (2006)
- La Motte, mon village en Abitibi (2014)

== Awards ==
- Prix littéraire de l'Abitibi-Témiscamingue (1989)
- Prix reconnaissance Thérèse-Pagé (2004)
- Honorary member, Conseil de la culture de l'Abitibi-Témiscamingue (2014)
- Honors from the National Assembly of Quebec from François Gendron (2017)
