= Aux Anciens Canadiens =

Restaurant in Quebec, Canada

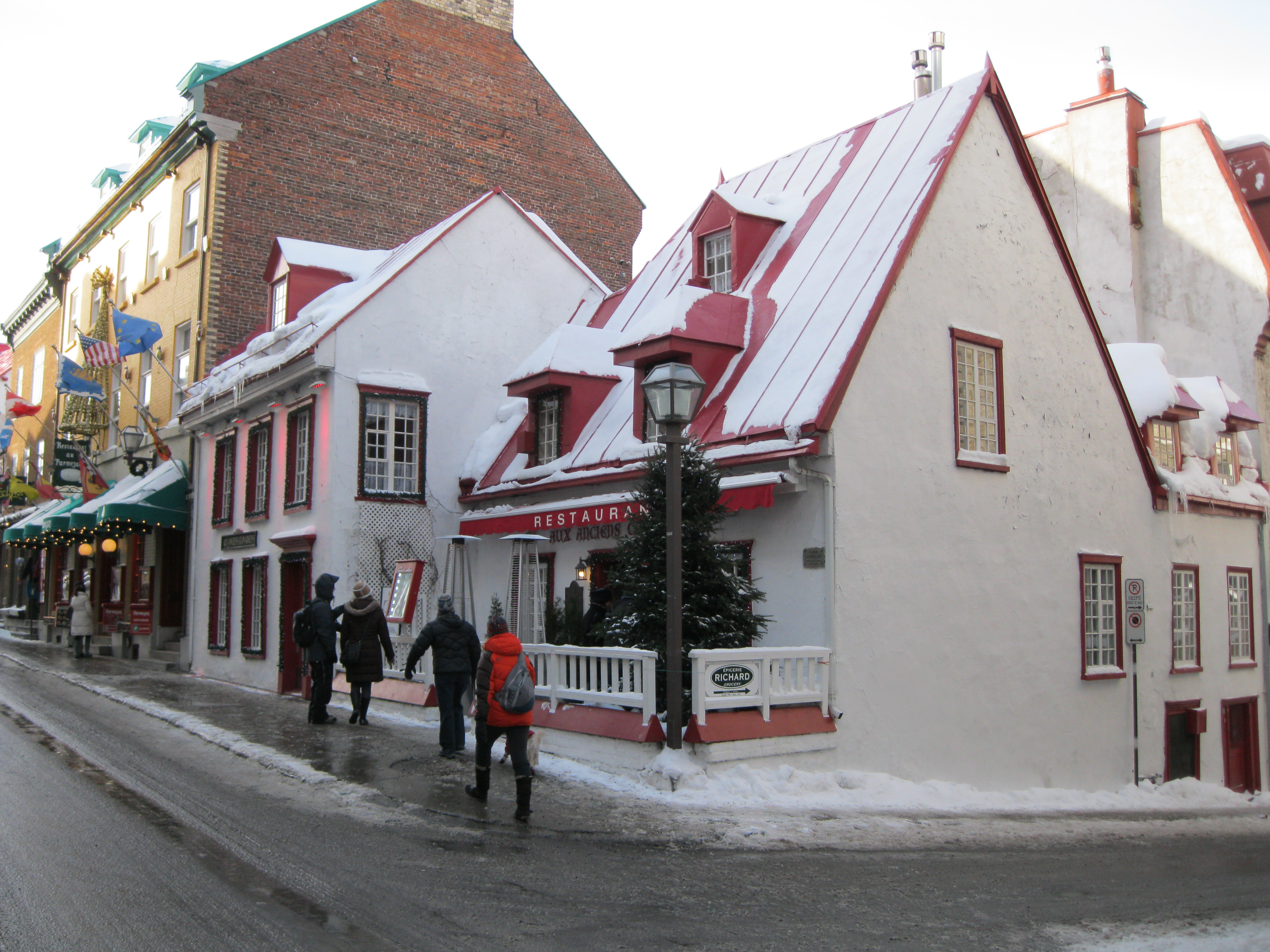
- The building in December 2012
- Interactive map of the Aux Anciens Canadiens area

General information
- Location: Quebec City, Quebec, Canada, 34 Rue Saint-Louis
- Coordinates: 46.8117°N 71.2073°W
- Current tenants: Aux Anciens Canadiens
- Construction started: 1675
- Completed: 1676; 350 years ago

Technical details
- Floor count: 3

Aux Anciens Canadiens is a restaurant in Quebec City, Quebec, Canada. Located on Rue Saint-Louis, at its corner with Des Jardins, the restaurant has occupied Maison Jacquet, originally a home completed in 1676, since 1966.

== Building ==
The historic Maison Jacquet (Eng: Jacquet House), one of the largest houses in the upper town in its day, was built in 1675–76. The site was granted to François Jacquet on 30 November, 1674, by the nuns of the neighbouring Ursuline Convent. Originally made of wood, the property was rebuilt in cut fieldstone around 1699.

The premises consist of two buildings, with that on the westernmost side being newer, and that on the east dating back to the French Regime.

Several prominent figures have lived in Maison Jacquet, including the author of the novel Les Anciens Canadiens, Philippe-Aubert de Gaspé, who lived there from 1815 to 1824. Though it is contradicted by history, the myth persists that General Montcalm also lived and died in the building.

== Gallery ==
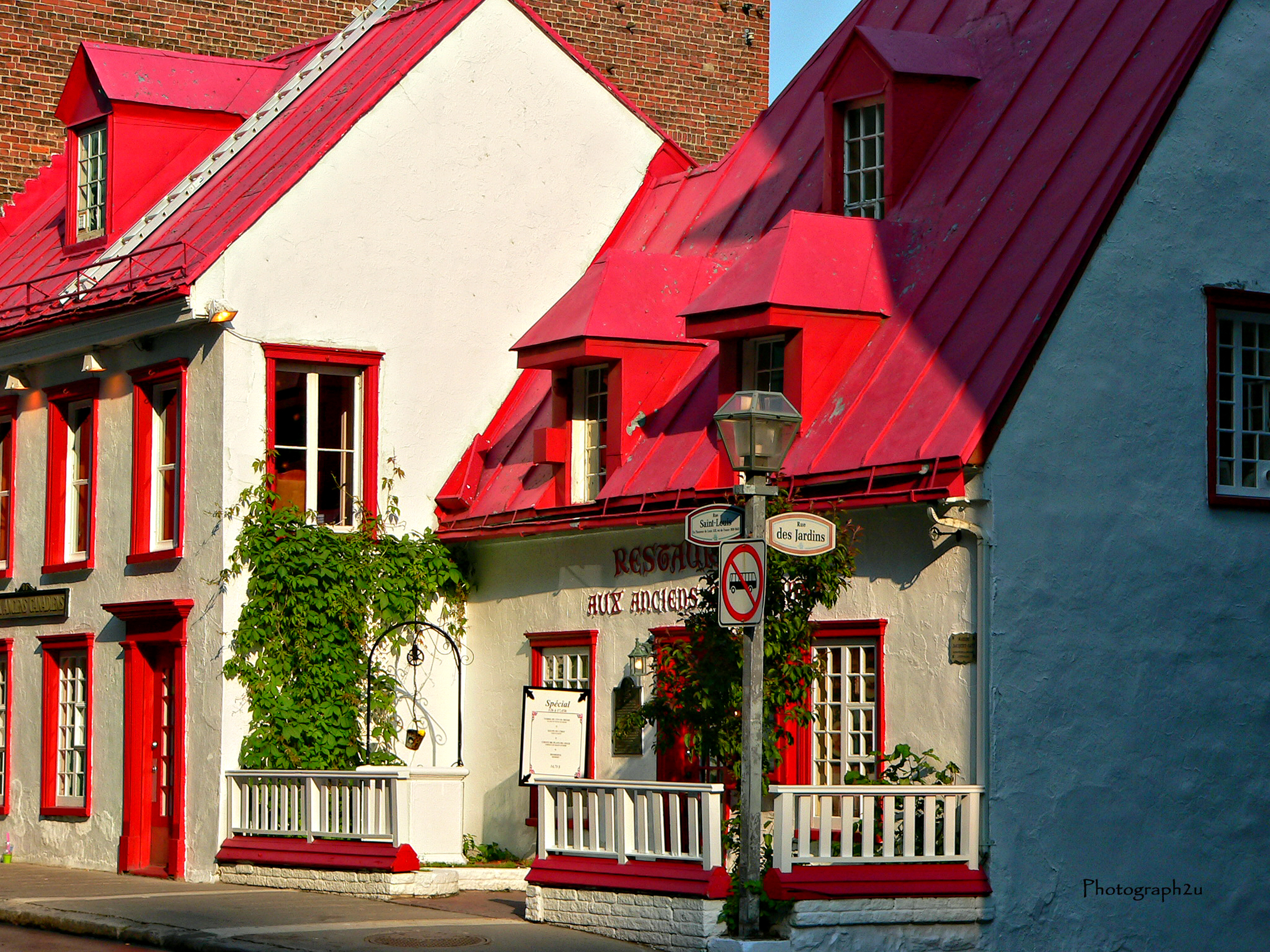
A 2005 view, looking west

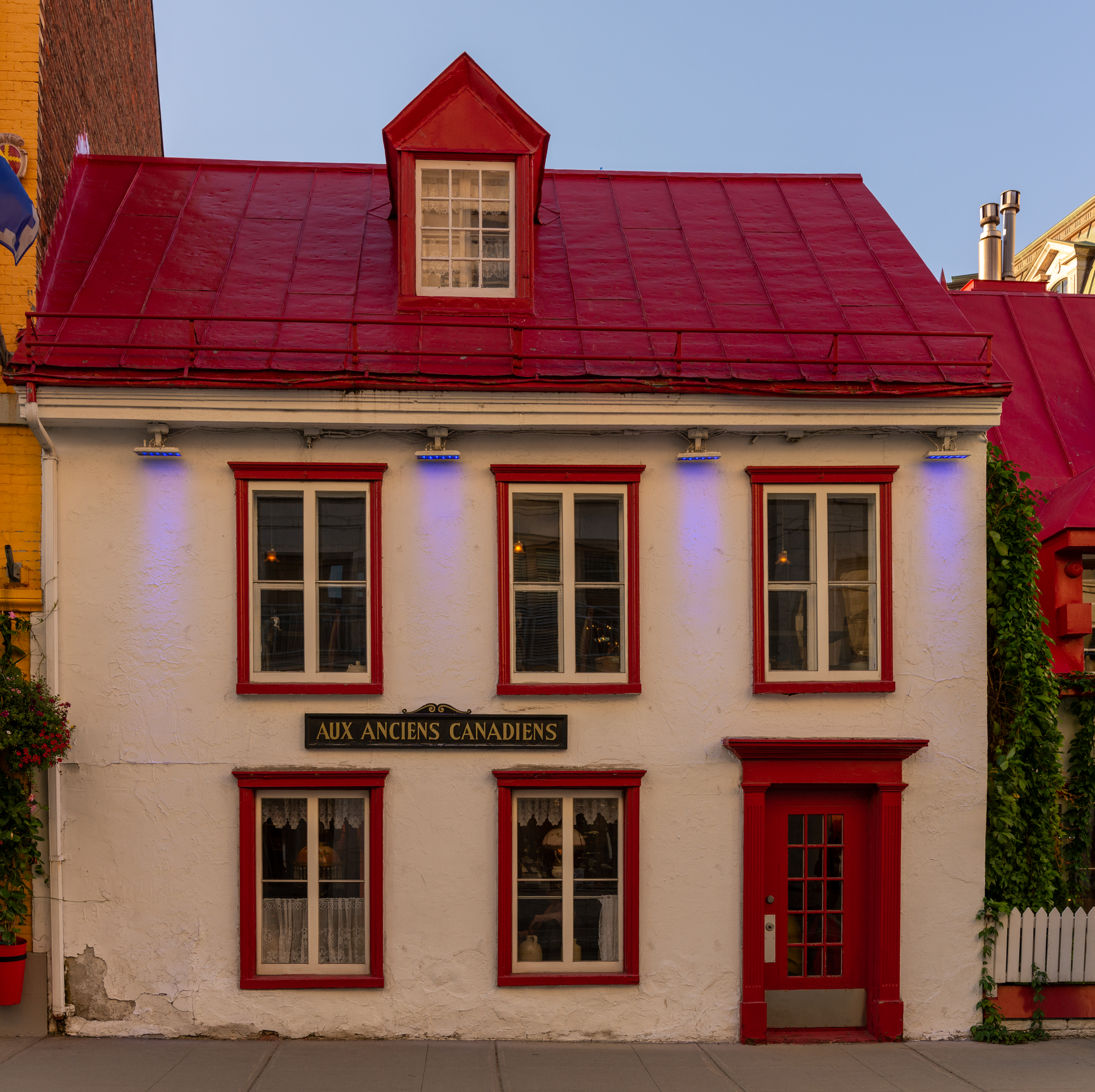
The western (and newer) of the two buildings

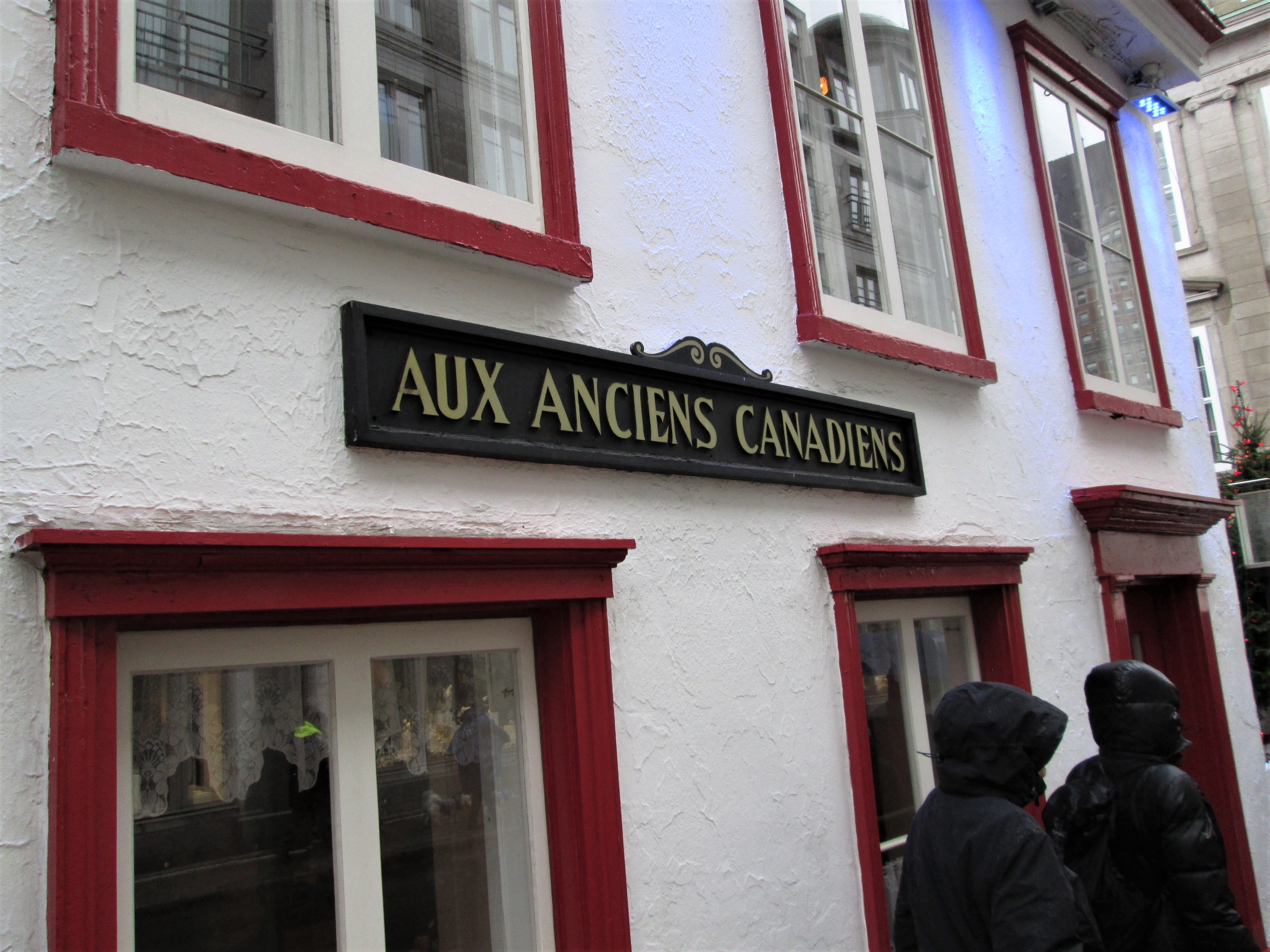
Restaurant sign
