= Ariane Mahrÿke Lemire =

Canadian singer

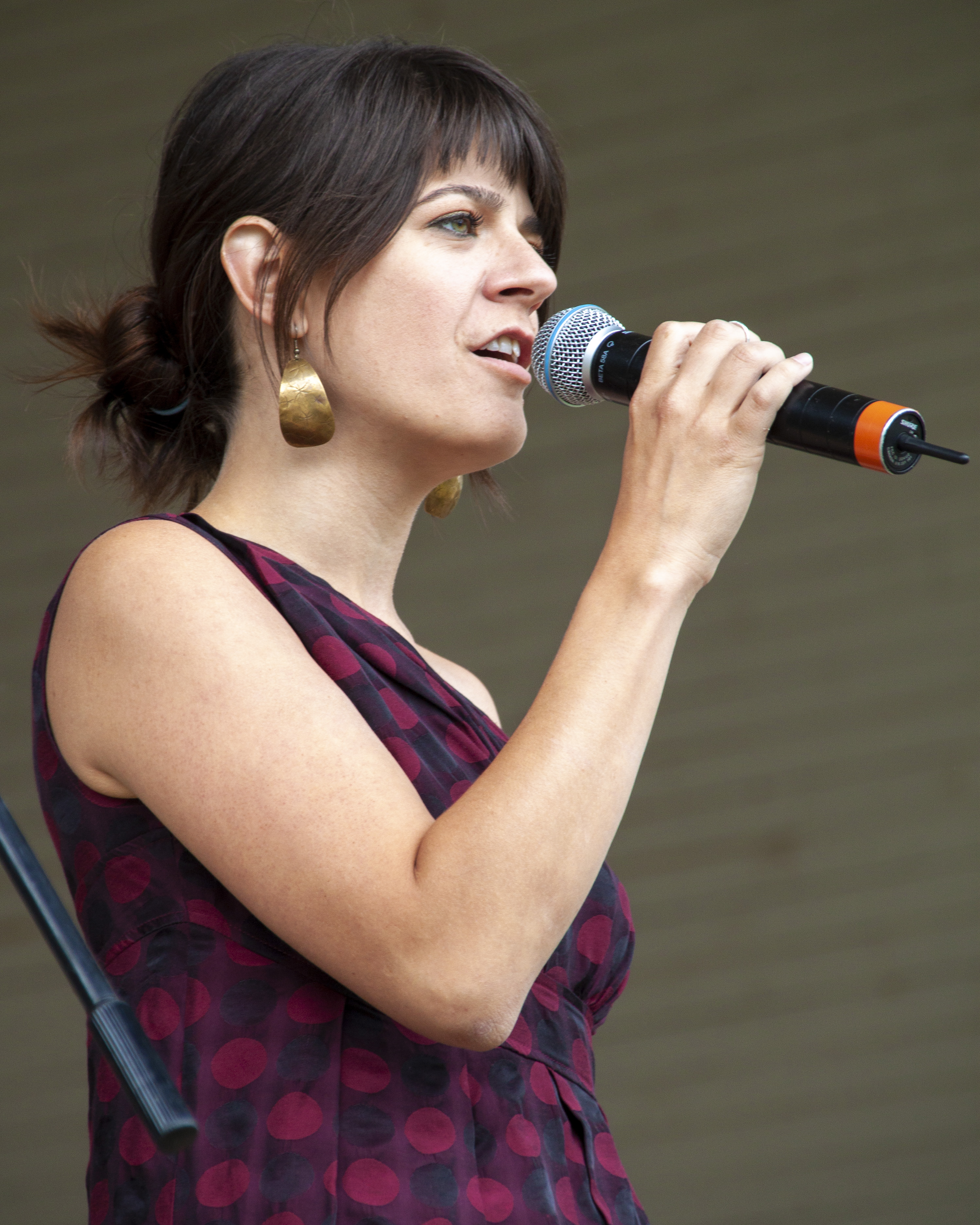
- Lemire in Calgary (2010)
- Occupation: Singer
- Mother: Gisele Lemire
- Musical career
- Genres: folk, jazz, blues, and electroacoustic
- Instruments: Vocals, guitar
- Website: arianemahrykelemire.com

Ariane Mahrÿke Lemire is a Canadian bilingual francophone singer-songwriter from Edmonton, Alberta. Her sound is a mix of folk, jazz, blues, and electroacoustic . She regularly sings in both English and French. Lemire won a Western Canadian Music Award in 2008 and 2012.

== Early life ==
Lemire was born to her mother, Giselle Lemire, who was a fransaskois guitarist and songwriter and François Rivard, a professional photographer and flautist. She was raised by her mother and Lyall Steel, a professional classical guitarist and bookkeeper. Lemire's mother tongue is French and she learned English at age 7.

== Music career ==
=== Double entendre ===
Double entendre was Lemire's debut album, released in 2005. It is half French and half English, with eight tracks in each language. A network of radio stations, called Rawlco Radio, as well as her cousin Roger L'Heureux financed the album. This first album received a 2008 Western Canadian Music Award, for Outstanding Francophone Recording.

=== Décousue ===
Lemire's second album, Décousue, was released in 2009. Rawlco Radio and Musicaction partially financed the album. It was recorded entirely in French with the exception of one Spanish track.

=== Wrecked Tangles and Love Knots ===
Lemire released her third album, Wrecked Tangles and Love Knots, on October 11, 2013. It was done mainly in English, but with the final track being in French. It includes folk and jazz genres. It features poetry and ballads. Rawlco Radio partially financed the album. The final track was recorded with Eamon McGrath at his family home using a purposefully out of tune piano played by McGrath himself.

=== Je deviens le loup ===
Lemire's fourth studio album, "Je deviens le loup" was released on November 4, 2016. The album received a nomination for a Trille Or.
