= Blanzay =

- Commune
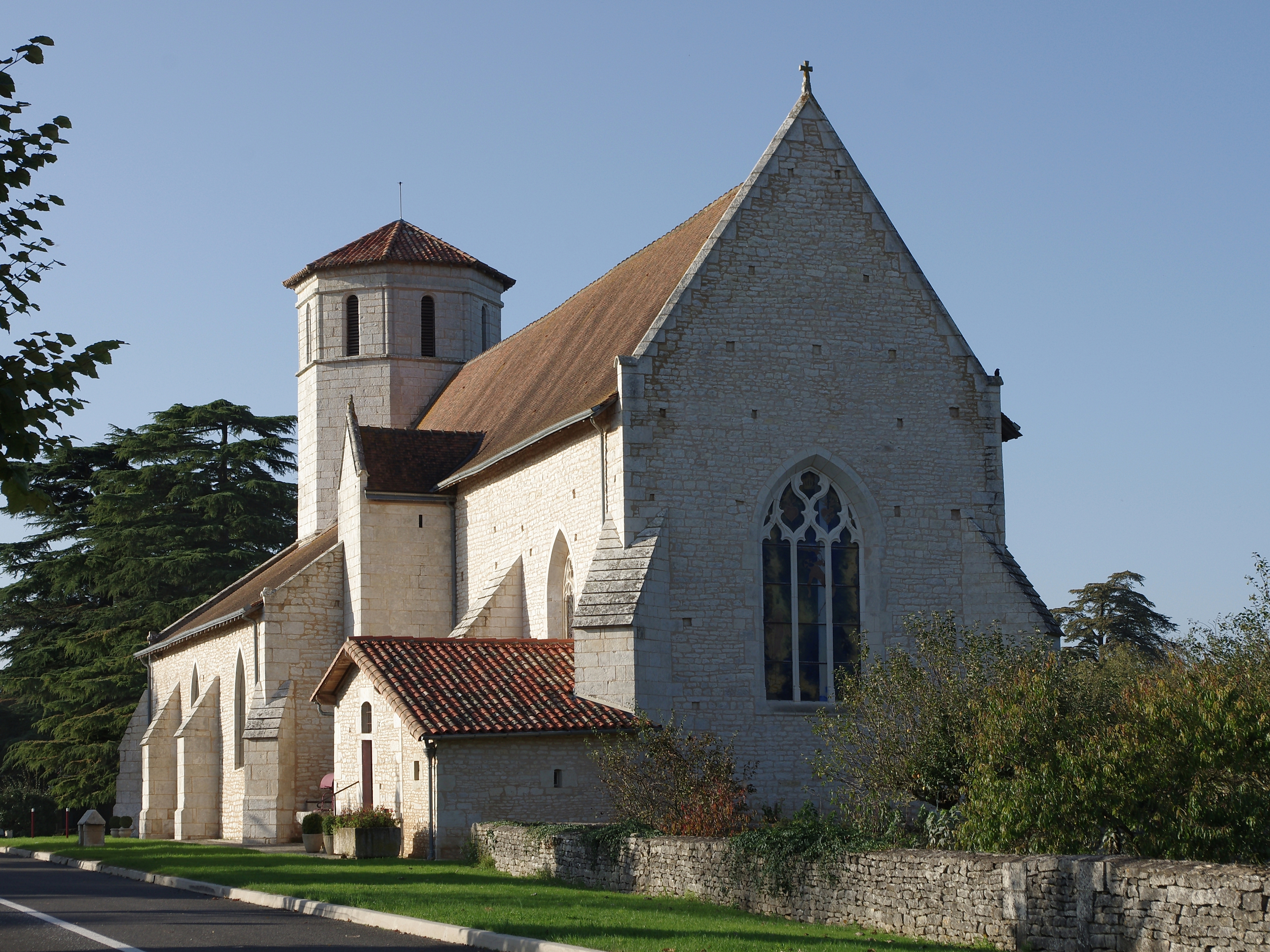
- The church of Saint-Hilaire, in Blanzay
- Location of Blanzay
- Location within France Location within Nouvelle-Aquitaine
- Coordinates: 46°12′11″N 0°15′22″E
- Country: France
- Region: Nouvelle-Aquitaine
- Department: Vienne
- Arrondissement: Montmorillon
- Canton: Civray
- Intercommunality: Civraisien en Poitou

Government
  - Mayor (2020–2026): Isabelle Surreaux
- Area^{1}: 35.45 km^{2} (13.69 sq mi)
- Highest elevation: 147 m (482 ft)
- Lowest elevation: 119 m (390 ft)
- Population (2023): 819
  - Density: 23.1/km^{2} (59.8/sq mi)
- Time zone: UTC+01:00 (CET)
  - Summer (DST): UTC+02:00 (CEST)
- INSEE/Postal code: 86029 /86400
- ^{1} French Land Register data, which excludes lakes, ponds, glaciers > 1 km^{2} (0.386 sq mi or 247 acres) and river estuaries.

Blanzay (French pronunciation: [blɑ̃zɛ]) is a commune in the Vienne department in the Nouvelle-Aquitaine region in western France.

== See also ==
- Communes of the Vienne department
