= François Baillairgé =

Canadian architect

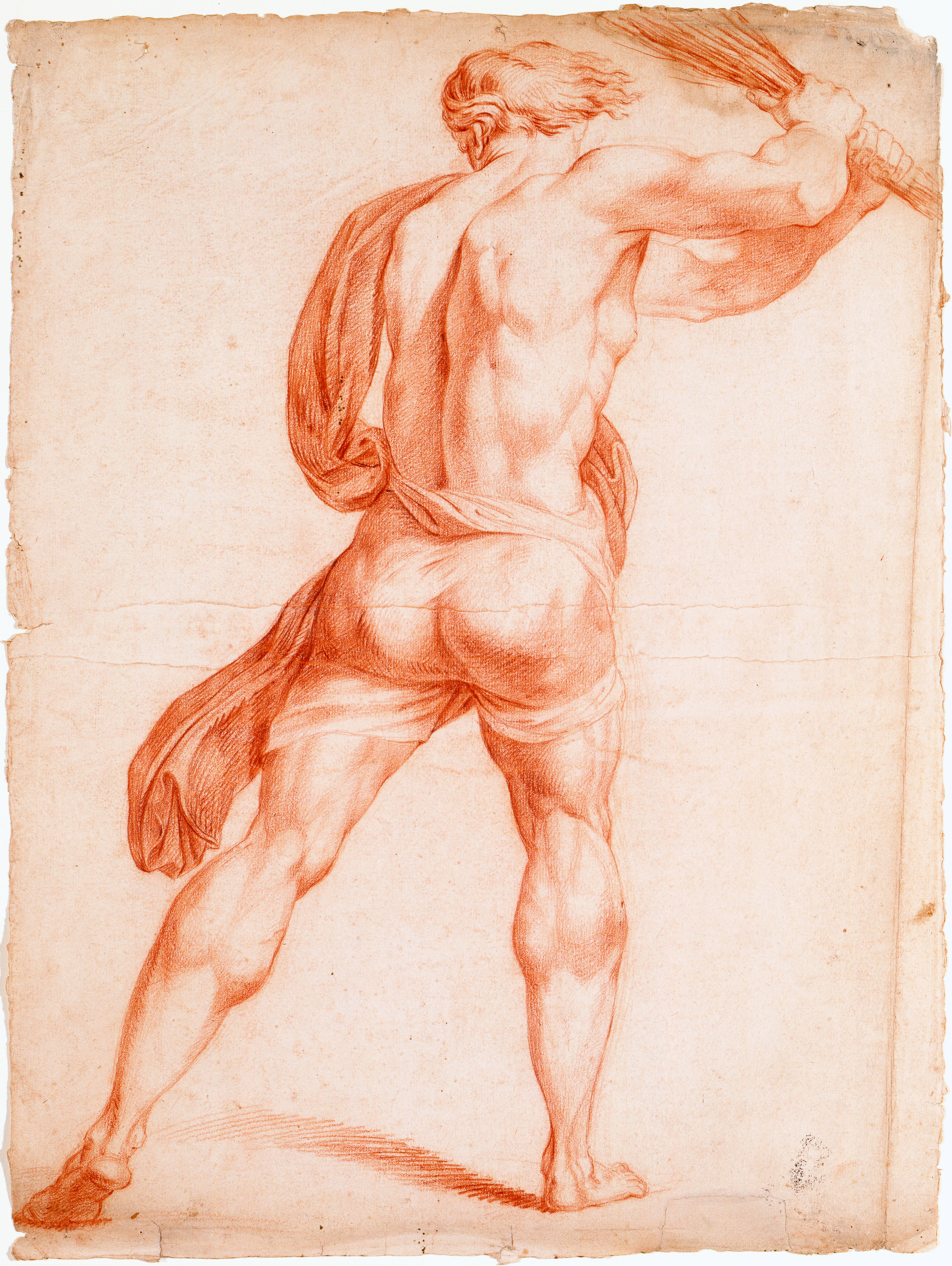
- François Baillairgé (1759-1830) Homme vu de dos, brandissant un fouet d'après « Le Martyre de saint André
- Born: 21 January 1759; Quebec
- Died: 15 September 1830 (aged 71); Quebec
- Education: apprenticed to Jean Baillairgé; Petit Séminaire de Québec
- Occupation: Architect

François Baillairgé (21 January 1759 – 15 September 1830) was an architect and artist with expertise in drawing, painting, carpentry, sculpture, and church decoration. Baillairgé was the first artist from Quebec City to complete his education at the Académie royale de peinture et de sculpture in Paris, which he attended from 1779 to 1781.

== Life ==
The son of Jean Baillairgé, François began an apprenticeship in his father's shop at the age of 14. There he studied and practised woodworking, wood-carving, and architecture. His brother, Pierre-Florent, was also active as a carver and joiner in the business. He also studied at the Petit Séminaire de Québec and then studied in Paris for three years, returning to Lower Canada in 1781. His training in Paris gave him a strong foundation in painting, sculpture, and architecture.

Baillairgé and his father worked together on the interior adornment of the Notre-Dame de Québec Basilica-Cathedral. Their work included the altarpieces, baldachin, statue, throne, and altar.

A great deal of his work was in the field of painting, both religious and secular, and he was very prolific. He achieved a high level of success as a wood-carver, sculptor, and carpenter through the architectural projects he took on while working with his father's workshop.

Ballairgé's most notable client was Prince Edward Augustus, the father of Queen Victoria, for whom he sculpted a figurehead.

By 1815, he had introduced his son, Thomas, into the family business and they produced some substantial work together. François also produced many plans for a variety of clients in his work as an architect.

== Works ==
Building	Year Completed	Location	Image
Morrin Centre, (former Quebec Prison)	1808 - 1813	Chaussée des Écossais (formerly St. Stanislas Street), Quebec City	
Notre-Dame Basilica, Montreal	interior decoration; choir 1785–95; facade & vault decoration, 1818; demolished, 1824	Montreal	
Quebec Court House	1799-1804; burned 1873	St. Louis Street, Quebec City	
Chateau St. Louis	1810-11; burned 1834	Quebec City	
Former Trois-Rivières Prison	1816-1822	Trois-Rivières	
Congregationalist Chapel	1818	St. Joseph Street, Quebec City	
Église Saint-Roch	1811, burned 1816; rebuilt 1816–18; demolished 1914	St. Joseph Street, Quebec City	
Grand Allee, country residence for Joseph F. Perrault	1812	Quebec City	
Finlay Market	1816	Quebec City	
Notre-Dame-des-Victoires, Quebec City, remodeling of the facade and interior	1816	Place Royale, Quebec City	
Jesuit Chapel	1818	Auteuil Street, Quebec City	
