= Poularies =

- Municipality
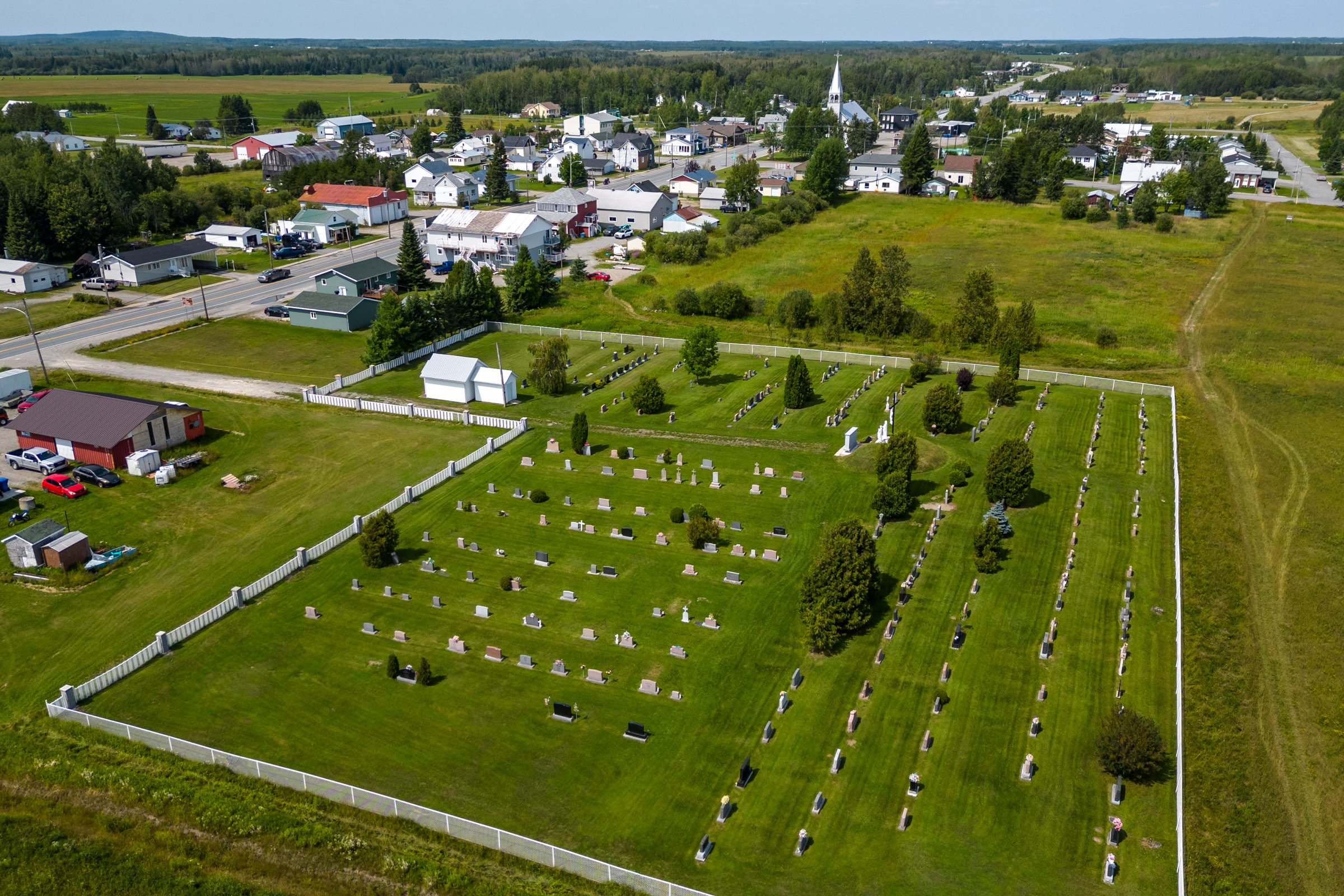

- Coat of arms

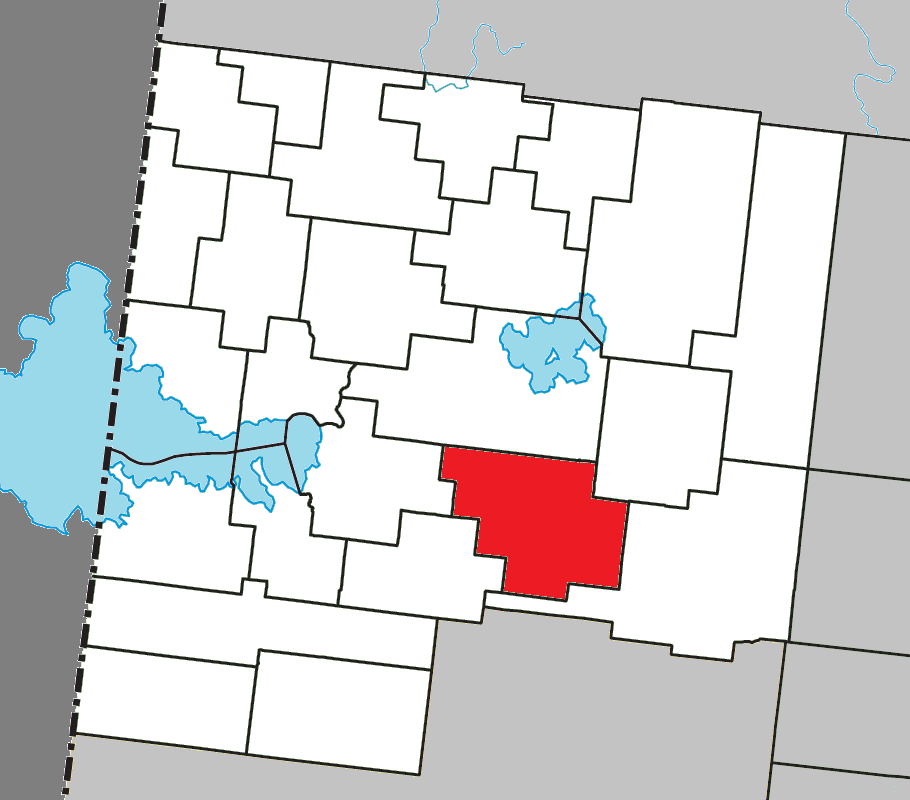
- Location within Abitibi-Ouest RCM

- Location in western Quebec
- Coordinates: 48°40′N 78°59′W
- Country: Canada
- Province: Quebec
- Region: Abitibi-Témiscamingue
- RCM: Abitibi-Ouest
- Settled: 1916
- Constituted: May 7, 1924

Government
  - Mayor: Pierre Godbout
  - Federal riding: Abitibi—Témiscamingue
  - Prov. riding: Abitibi-Ouest

Area
  - Total: 169.73 km^{2} (65.53 sq mi)
  - Land: 168.19 km^{2} (64.94 sq mi)

Population (2021)
  - Total: 662
  - Density: 3.9/km^{2} (10/sq mi)
  - Pop (2016-21)1: ▼2.9%
  - Dwellings: 285
- Time zone: UTC−5 (EST)
  - Summer (DST): UTC−4 (EDT)
- Postal code(s): J0Z 3E0
- Area code: 819
- Highways: R-101 R-390
- Website: poularies.ao.ca

Poularies (French pronunciation: [pulaʁi]) is a municipality in northwestern Quebec, Canada in the Abitibi-Ouest Regional County Municipality. It covers 168.19 square kilometres (64.94 sq mi) and had a population of 662 as of the 2021 Canadian census.

The municipality was incorporated on May 7, 1924.

== Demographics ==
Historical census populations – Poularies

Year	Pop.	±%
1931	715	—
1941	1,247	+74.4%
1951	1,246	−0.1%
1956	1,264	+1.4%
1961	1,196	−5.4%
1966	1,178	−1.5%

Year	Pop.	±%
1971	972	−17.5%
1976	883	−9.2%
1981	903	+2.3%
1986	849	−6.0%
1991	835	−1.6%
1996	838	+0.4%

Year	Pop.	±%
2001	751	−10.4%
2006	693	−7.7%
2011	679	−2.0%
2016	682	+0.4%
2021	662	−2.9%

Source: Statistics Canada

Private dwellings occupied by usual residents (2021): 274 (total dwellings: 285)

Mother tongue (2021):

- English as first language: 0%
- French as first language: 98.5%
- English and French as first language: 0.8%
- Other as first language: 0%

== Government ==
Municipal council (2023):

- Mayor: Pierre Godbout
- Councillors: Priscillia Lefebvre, Tony Rancourt, Réal Rancourt, Hugh Fortier, Francine Vallières, Valérie Rancourt
