= Pierre-Florent Baillairgé =

Canadian woodworker (1761–1812)

Pierre-Florent Baillairgé (29 June 1761 – 9 December 1812) was from Quebec, the son of Jean Baillairgé, and did spend some time in the wood carving and joinery end of his father's business. His brother, François, already was there and the three did decorative wood-carving for several churches in the region.

Pierre-Florent was a craftsman rather than an artist; he conformed to the French style the family had brought to Lower Canada. He showed much more expertise as a joiner and that is evident in his surviving work.
