= Thomas Baillairgé =

Canadian wood carver and architect

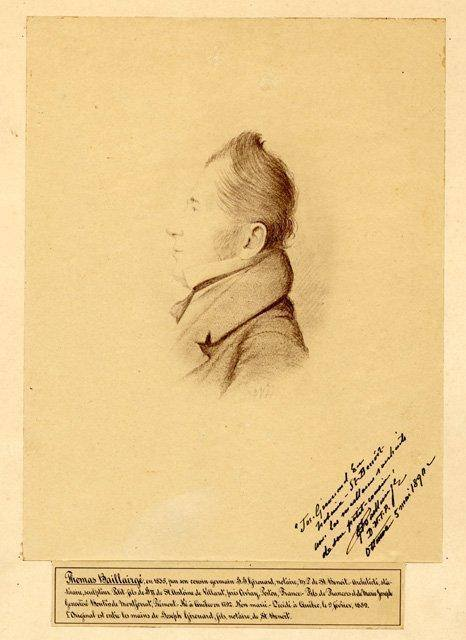
- Born: 20 December 1791
- Died: 9 February 1859 (aged 67)
- Education: apprenticed to François Baillairgé; Petit Séminaire de Québec
- Occupation: Architect

Thomas Baillairgé (20 December 1791 – 9 February 1859) was both a wood carver and architect, following the tradition of the family. He was the son of François Baillairgé and the grandson of Jean Baillairgé, both men being termed architects under the definition of the time. The family had been based in Quebec since 1741 and Thomas attended English school and then the Petit Séminaire de Québec. During the latter time, he would also have begun to learn wood carving and architecture.

By 1815, Thomas had begun his career in earnest, and from then until 1848, he designed numerous buildings; churches, houses and other projects. During this period he trained a number of students. Among his apprentices was Charles Baillairgé, his cousin's nephew. He also did wood carving and some painting. Through his work and that of people he trained, his influence carried through the first two decades of the twentieth century.

Building	Year Completed	Builder	Style	Location	Image
Eglise St. Roch	1841	Thomas Baillairgé		St. Joseph Street, Quebec, Quebec	
Saint-Joseph church	1941	Thomas Baillairgé		Deschambault, Quebec	
Saint-Charles-Borromée church	1830	Thomas Baillairgé		Grondines, Quebec	

== Works ==
- Quebec Seminary, Chapel of the Congregation, 1821–24
- St. Genevieve Roman Catholic Church, Gouin Boulevard West, Montreal; designed 1822; built 1843-45
- Church of Sainte-Claire in 1823
- Notre Dame Roman Catholic Basilica, St. Famille Chapel, 1824; new facade for the church, 1843–44; burned 1922; rebuilt
- Hotel Dieu Palais street, altar for the Chapel, 1829; new facade for the chapel, 1835
- Parliament House, for the National Assembly, a conversion of the existing Archbishop's Palace on the present site of Montmorency Park; with major additions, 1830–36; completed in 1852 by Pierre Gauvreau and George Browne; burned 1854
- Church at Lauzon in 1830
- Church of Saint-Pierre-les-Becquets (Les Becquets) in 1839
- Church of Saint-Anselme in 1845
- Church of St Patrick’s at Quebec in 1831 burned 1971; demol. 1974
- Church of Saint-Charles-des-Grondines in 1831
- Church of Sainte-Croix in 1835
- Ursuline Convent, Parloir Street, addition of the Ste. Angele wing, 1836; altered 1873 by J.F. Peachy (L. Noppen et al.)
- Church at Deschambault in 1833; interior 1841
- Church of Sainte-Geneviève in 1836
- Church of Sainte-Luce built in 1836
- Church of Saint-Joachim in 1815
- Church at Lauzon
- Church of Saint-Antoine-de-Tilly
- Church of Saint-François on the Île d’Orléans
- Church at Lotbinière in 1824
- Church at Charlesbourg in 1833
- Church of L’Ancienne-Lorette 1837
- St. Charles Roman Catholic Church, Grondines Quebec, 1838–40
- St. Francois Xavier Roman Catholic Church, 1839–49; St. Francois-Du-Lac, QUE.
- St. Roch Roman Catholic Convent, Church Street, 1842–44; altered 1875, 1912, 1955; demol
- Bishop's Palace, Montmorency Park, 1843–44
- Church at Sainte-Luce in 1845
- Sisters of Charity Orphanage, St. Olivier Street, rebuilding of the orphanage, 1845
- Eglise St. Roch, St. Joseph Street, 1846–50; demol. 1914
- Church at Lévis in 1850
- the nave of the church of Pointe-aux-Trembles (Neuville) in 1854
- Séminaire de Nicolet in 1826
- Convent of Saint-Roch
- Collège de Sainte-Anne-de-la-Pocatière.
