= Place d'Armes (Quebec City) =

Urban square in Quebec City, Canada

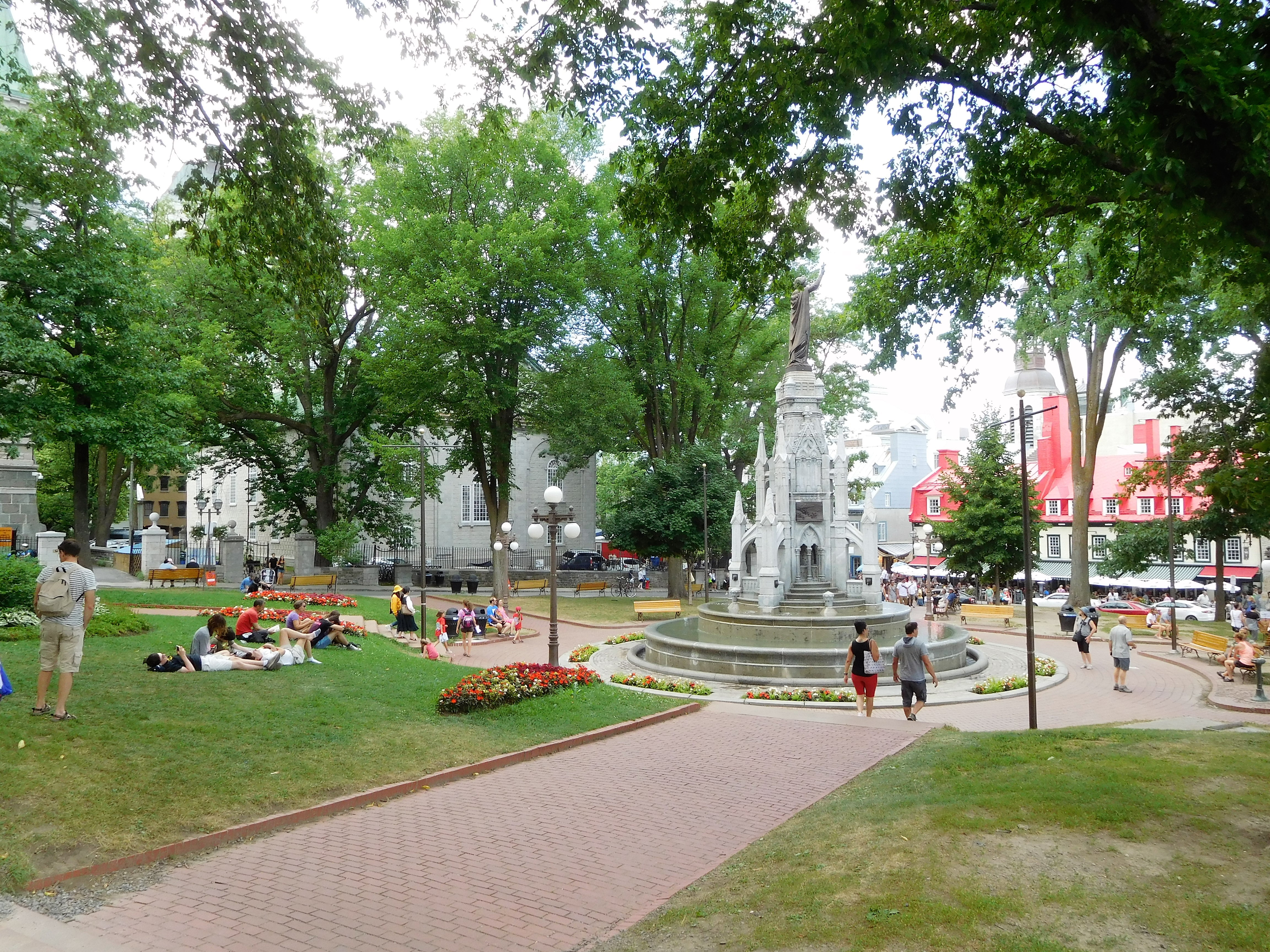
- The square in 2019, looking northwest
- Interactive map of Place d'Armes
- Type: Urban park
- Location: Quebec City, Quebec, Canada
- Coordinates: 46.8126026°N 71.20580028°W
- Created: 1648 (378 years ago)

Place d'Armes is an urban park in Quebec City, Quebec, Canada. It is bounded by Rue Saint-Anne to the north, Fort Street to the east, Rue Saint-Louis to the south and Rue du Trésor to the west. The park's name means a place of arms, which is the gathering place of a small troop and a central space hosting the important ceremonies of military life.

The park has a monument, part of a fountain (erected in 1915), in its centre.

The park was created between 1640 and 1648 by Governor Charles Jacques Huault de Montmagny. It became a public park in 1865.

The Château Frontenac overlooks the square from the south, and the Cathedral of the Holy Trinity from the west.
