= Cathedral Basilica of Notre-Dame de Québec =

Coordinates: 46.8138°N 71.2062°W

Notre-Dame de Québec
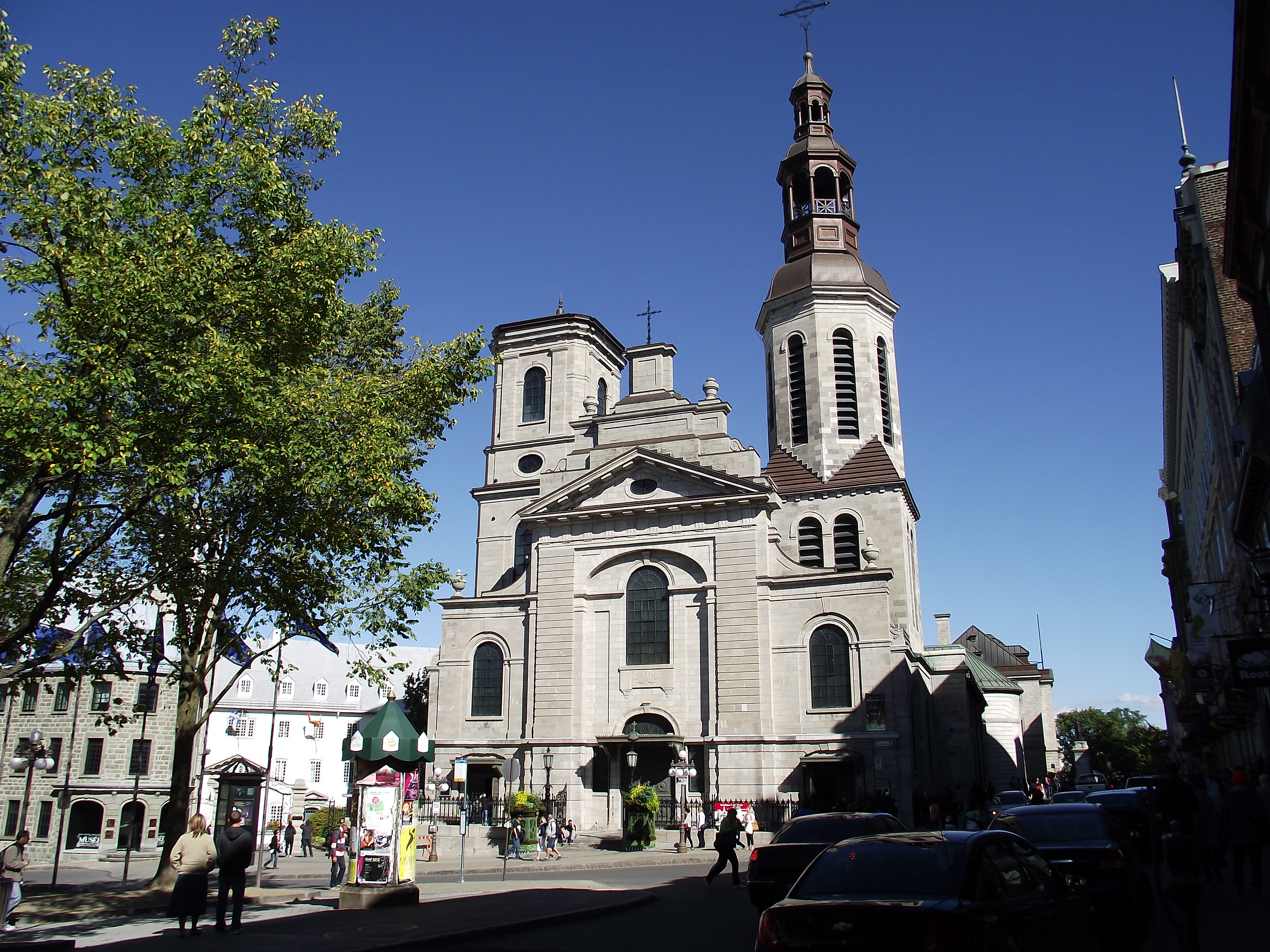
- Cathedral-Basilica of Notre-Dame de Québec in 2012
- Notre-Dame de Québec
- Location: 16, rue de Buade; Quebec City, Quebec; G1R 4A1
- Country: Canada
- Denomination: Roman Catholic

History
- Status: Cathedral, minor basilica
- Founded: 1647 (original building)
- Founder: François de Laval
- Dedication: Virgin Mary

Architecture
- Functional status: Functional
- Designated: 1989
- Architect: Jean Baillairgé
- Architectural type: Neoclassical
- Completed: 1843

Administration
- Archdiocese: Quebec

National Historic Site of Canada
- Official name: Notre-Dame Roman Catholic Cathedral National Historic Site of Canada
- Designated: 1989

The Cathedral Basilica of Notre-Dame de Québec is the primatial church and seat of the Archdiocese of Quebec, located at 16, rue de Buade, Quebec City, Quebec. It is the oldest church in Canada and the first to be elevated to the rank of minor basilica, receiving the honor from Pope Pius IX in 1874. Four governors of New France and the bishops of Quebec are buried in the crypt, including the first, François de Laval. The church is a National Historic Site of Canada, and located within the UNESCO World Heritage Site of Historic District of Old Québec.

== History ==
The cathedral is located on the site of a chapel, Notre Dame de la Recouvrance, constructed by Samuel de Champlain in 1633. Construction of the first cathedral building began in 1647, and it was given the name Notre-Dame de la Paix.

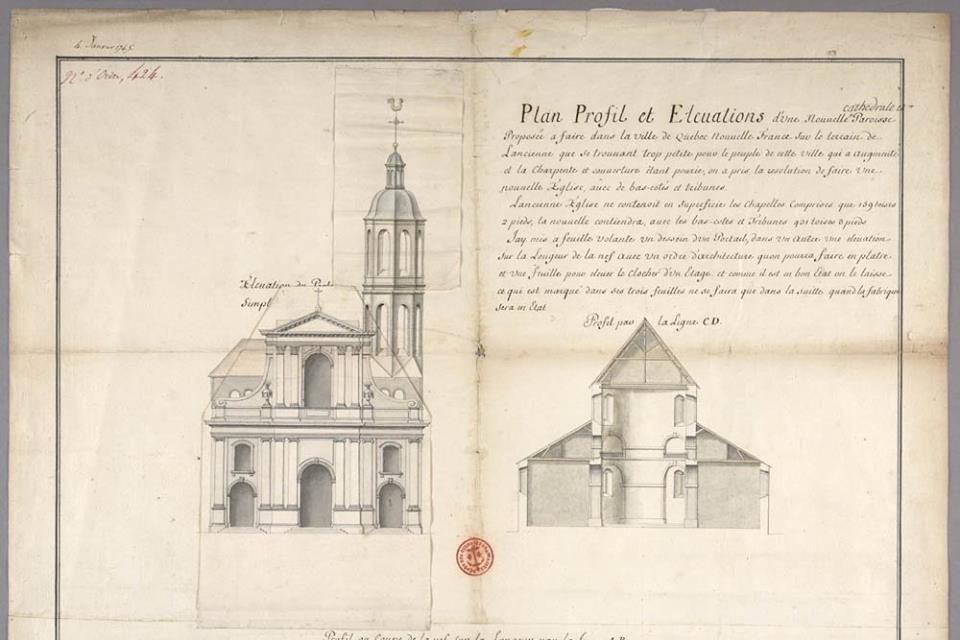
Plans from 1744, used during the reconstruction of the church in 1759

The cathedral has twice been destroyed by fire, the first time being during the Siege of Quebec in 1759. It was rebuilt from plans by Gaspard-Joseph Chaussegros de Léry draughted in 1743. The belltower, however, was designed by Jean Baillairgé, who also oversaw construction. The interior was designed by Jean Baillairgé and his son François from 1786 to 1822. In 1843, François' son, Thomas, suggested a reconstruction of the façade to resemble the church of Sainte-Geneviève in Paris, resulting in the finest Neo-classic façade in Québec. The cathedral was richly decorated with impressive works of art: baldaquin, canopy, episcopal throne dais, stained glass windows, paintings, and chancel lamp (a gift of Louis XIV).

In 1922 the church was again gutted by fire; the Ku Klux Klan was initially suspected of arson. In 1927, an American career criminal, Ray Marsden confessed in prison to a series of church arsons, including Notre-Dame, that were done to cover his burglaries. The church was restored by architects Maxime Roisin and Raoul Chenevert. Raoul Chenevert added a presbytery beside the cathedral in 1931–1932. From 1961 to 1993 Claude Lagacé was organist and choirmaster at the cathedral.

In 2014 the cathedral celebrated its 350th anniversary. As part of the celebrations, a holy door was constructed—the second outside Europe and only the eighth in the world. The holy door was opened on December 8, 2013, and remained open until December 28, 2014. It again opened from December 8, 2015, to November 20, 2016, for the Year of Mercy after which it was sealed. It was reopened in 2024 for the 350th anniversary of foundation of the Quebec diocese and sealed again in December of that year, and would not be reopened during the 2025 Jubilee.

The cathedral was designated as a national historic site of Canada in 1989 because "...of its long and close associations with the history of New France; its influence on subsequent ecclesiastical architecture and interior decoration in Québec."

== Gallery ==
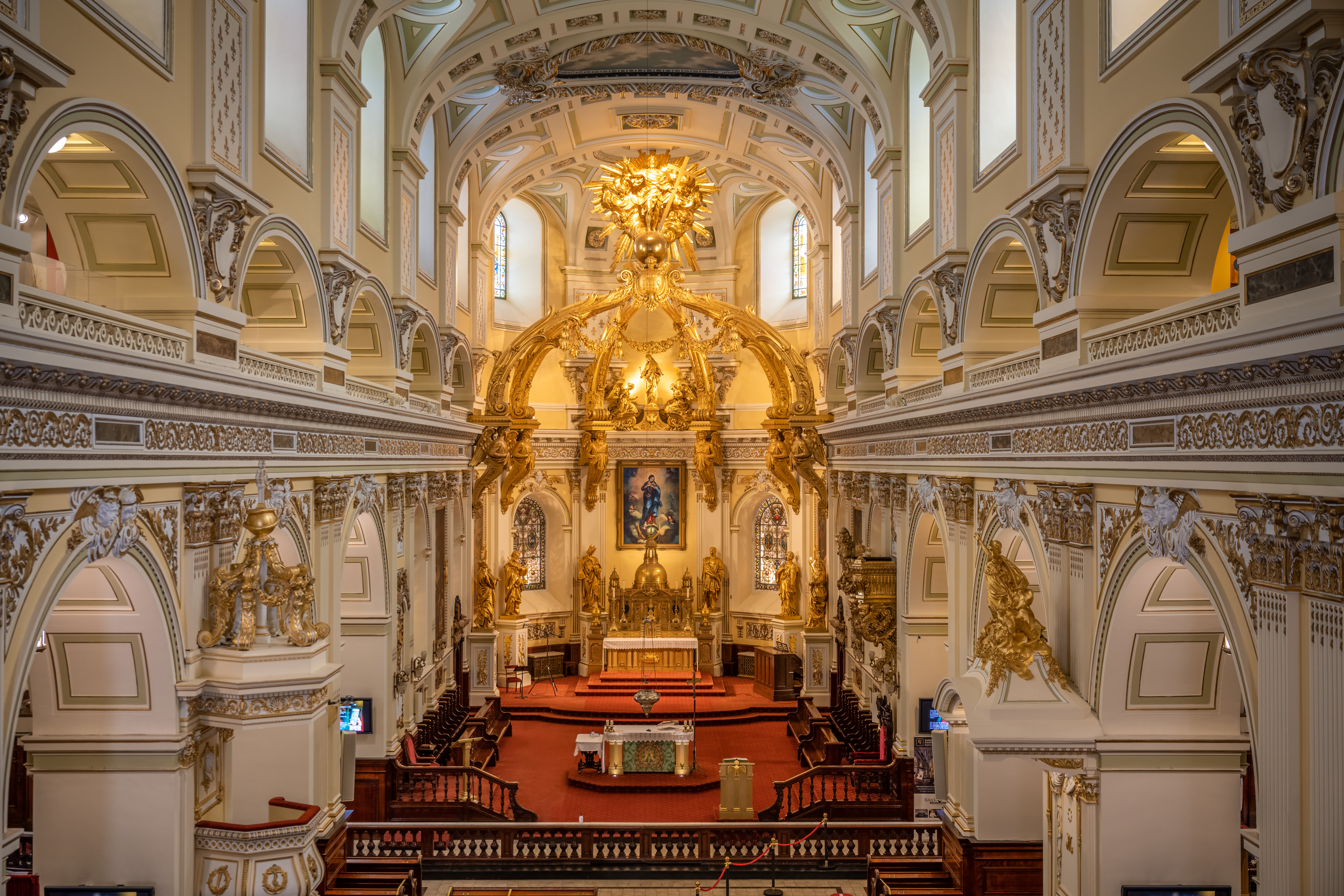
Interior

== See also ==
- Jean Lemire, the master carpenter who constructed the south steeple of an early iteration of the church, 1684
- List of cathedrals in Canada
- Roman Catholic Marian churches
