= Jean Baillairgé =

Canadian carpenter and architect

- Born: 31 October 1726; Blanzay, France
- Died: 6 September 1805 (aged 78); Quebec, Lower Canada
- Occupation: Architect
- Projects: Notre-Dame Basilica-Cathedral (Quebec City)

Jean Baillairgé (31 October 1726 – 6 September 1805) was a carpenter by trade and there is some reference to his being an architect. He was born in Blanzay, France and his death occurred at Quebec, Lower Canada.

Jean arrived at Quebec on August 30, 1741, on the same ship as Bishop Henri-Marie Dubreil de Pontbriand and may have received assistance from the bishop to train in his field of carpentry. It is certain that he received his training in New France and was considered to be skilled in the production of accurate plans. He likely received most of his training on the worksite, which would have been normal for those times.

Baillairgé married in 1750 and was involved in construction on the church at Sainte-Anne-de-la-Pocatière where he and his wife had moved. They returned to Quebec City after this and he formed a partnership which developed a good reputation. He was a member of the militia during the Seven Years’ War and fought on the Plains of Abraham.

== Works ==
In 1766, Baillairgé, competed for the reconstruction of Notre-Dame Basilica-Cathedral (Quebec City), which had been burned during the war, for the Roman Catholic diocese of Quebec. His plan was ultimately rejected with the new bishop, Jean-Olivier Briand, siding with those opposed to his design. He threatened to leave the province but a successful proposal for the cathedral belfry in 1770 set his career on a solid footing. The remainder of his career had various church constructions as its focal point and the importance of his work Quebec to art and architecture was a product of that time.

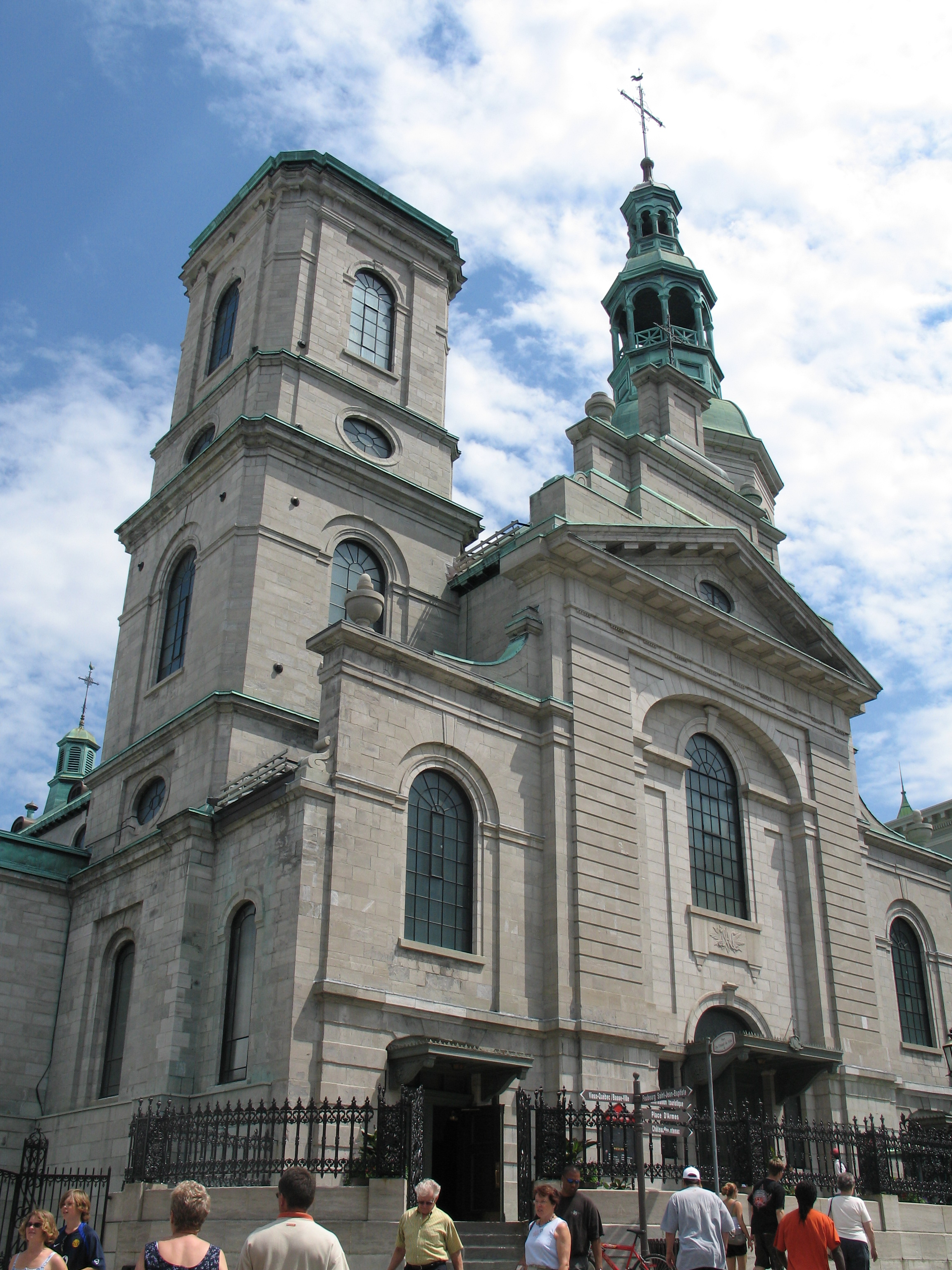
Jean Baillairgé oversaw construction and designed the belltower and interior of Notre-Dame Basilica-Cathedral (Quebec City) from 1786 to 1822.

== Significance ==
Jean Baillairgé holds an important position in the history of art and architecture in Quebec after the Conquest. Perhaps more important than his work was the Baillairgé dynasty which he founded and which has had a prominent role in this area of Quebec art and architectural history. His son, François Baillairgé, worked with his father and continued the family contribution to art and architecture. Another son, Pierre-Florent, contributed significantly as a carver and joiner.
