= Lairet River =

Tributary of Saint-Charles River in Québec, Canada

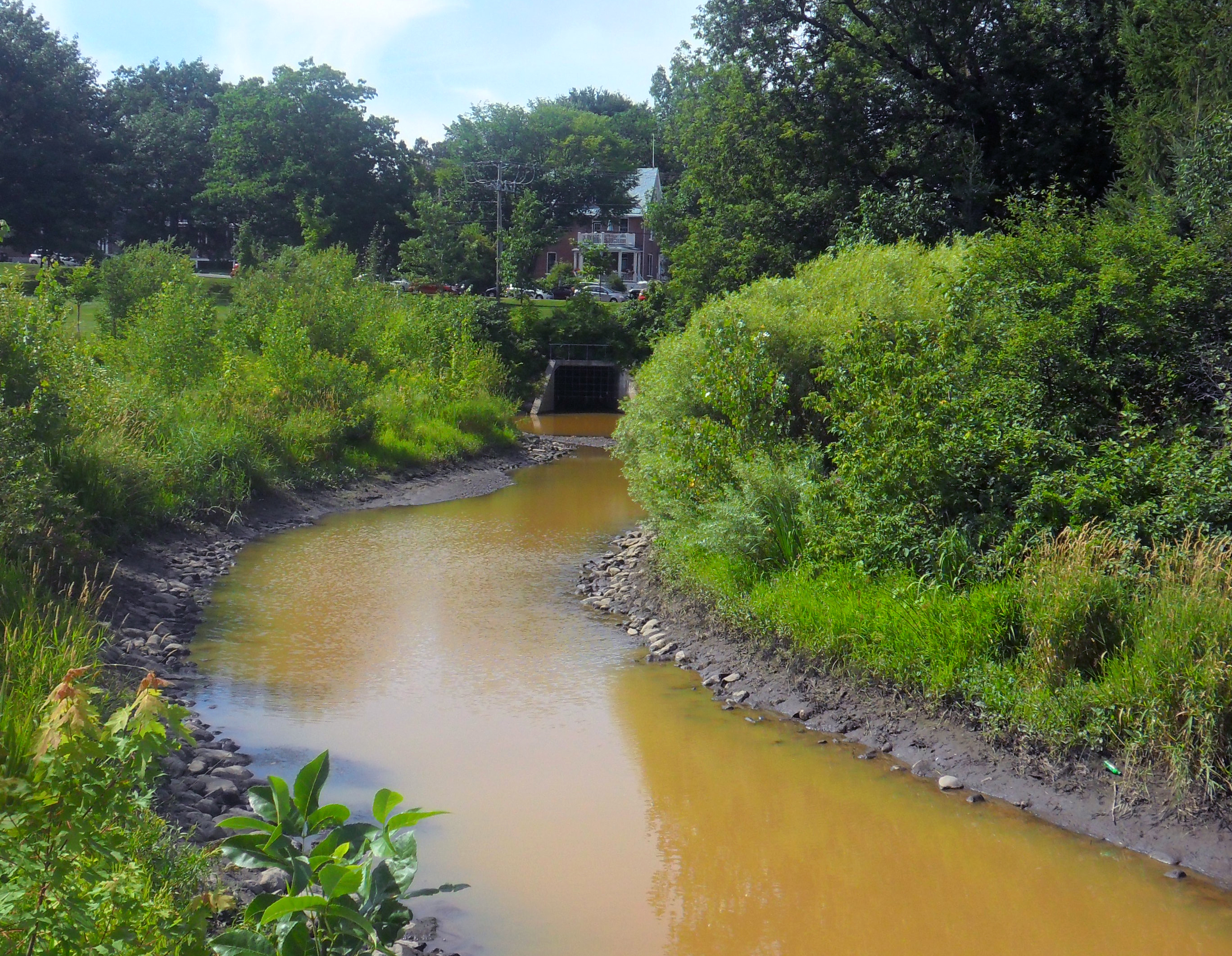

Location
- Country: Canada
- Province: Quebec
- Region: Capitale-Nationale
- Regional County Municipality: Quebec City (sector "Limoilou")

Physical characteristics
- Source: Lairet Canal
  - location: Quebec (city) (sector "Limoilou")
  - coordinates: 46°49′31″N 71°14′26″W
- Mouth: Rivière Saint-Charles
  - location: Quebec (city) (sector "Limoilou")
  - coordinates: 46°49′26″N 71°14′20″W
  - elevation: 10 m
- Length: 0.3 km (0.19 mi)

The Lairet River is a tributary of the Saint-Charles River, crossing Quebec City, Quebec, Canada. Over two kilometers long, it took its source in the vicinity of Charlesbourg and flowed in meanders in Limoilou. It has been completely channeled since the 1960s, except for a segment refitted in 2008.

== History ==
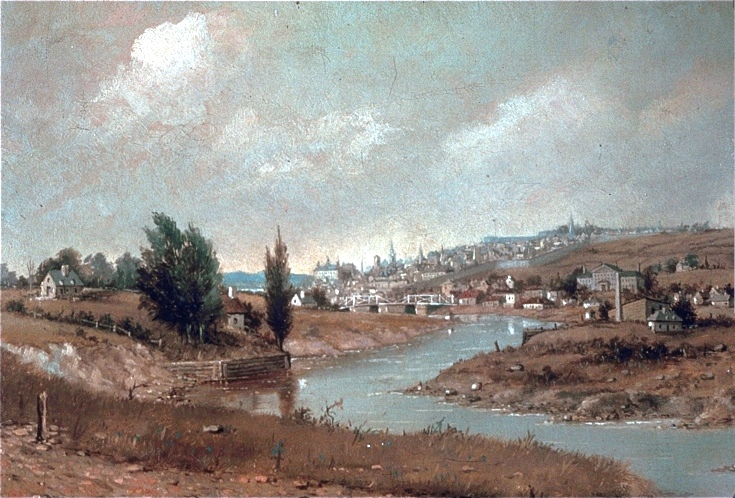
The river in 1886.

On 14 September 1535, the river was seen for the first time by French explorer Jacques Cartier. Cartier and his crew overwinter at the confluence of the Lairet River and the Saint-Charles River, near the village St. Lawrence Iroquoians of Stadaconé. In New France, the name of the river appeared for the first time on a document in 1626 (designated "Rivière de Lairet" in 1637 and "Rivière de Larray" in 1685). The Jesuits also used the name "Jacques-Cartier river" in 1651, probably in connection with the Jacques-Cartier fort, a Jesuit residence built at the mouth of the river from 1625. Jean-Baptiste Larue used the toponym "Rivière à la Rez" in 1821. Until the 20th century, the course of the river retained its natural state and crossed agricultural land.

The industrialization of Limoilou created several industries and institutions near the Lairet river in the first half of XXth Century. In this urbanized segment, the river gradually became an open sewer. In addition, the winding course was an obstacle in the construction of streets following the grid plan. Piping the river was requested by different owners. On 15 March 1960, the MP for Québec-Est, Armand Maltais, announced the start of work on pipeline from the river. This work will take place in three phases (1960, 1965 and 1967). Finally, the river is channeled to its mouth with the Saint-Charles River passing under the Cartier-Brébeuf National Historic Site. This work then became part of the concreting of the banks of the Saint-Charles river, which was completed in the 1970s.

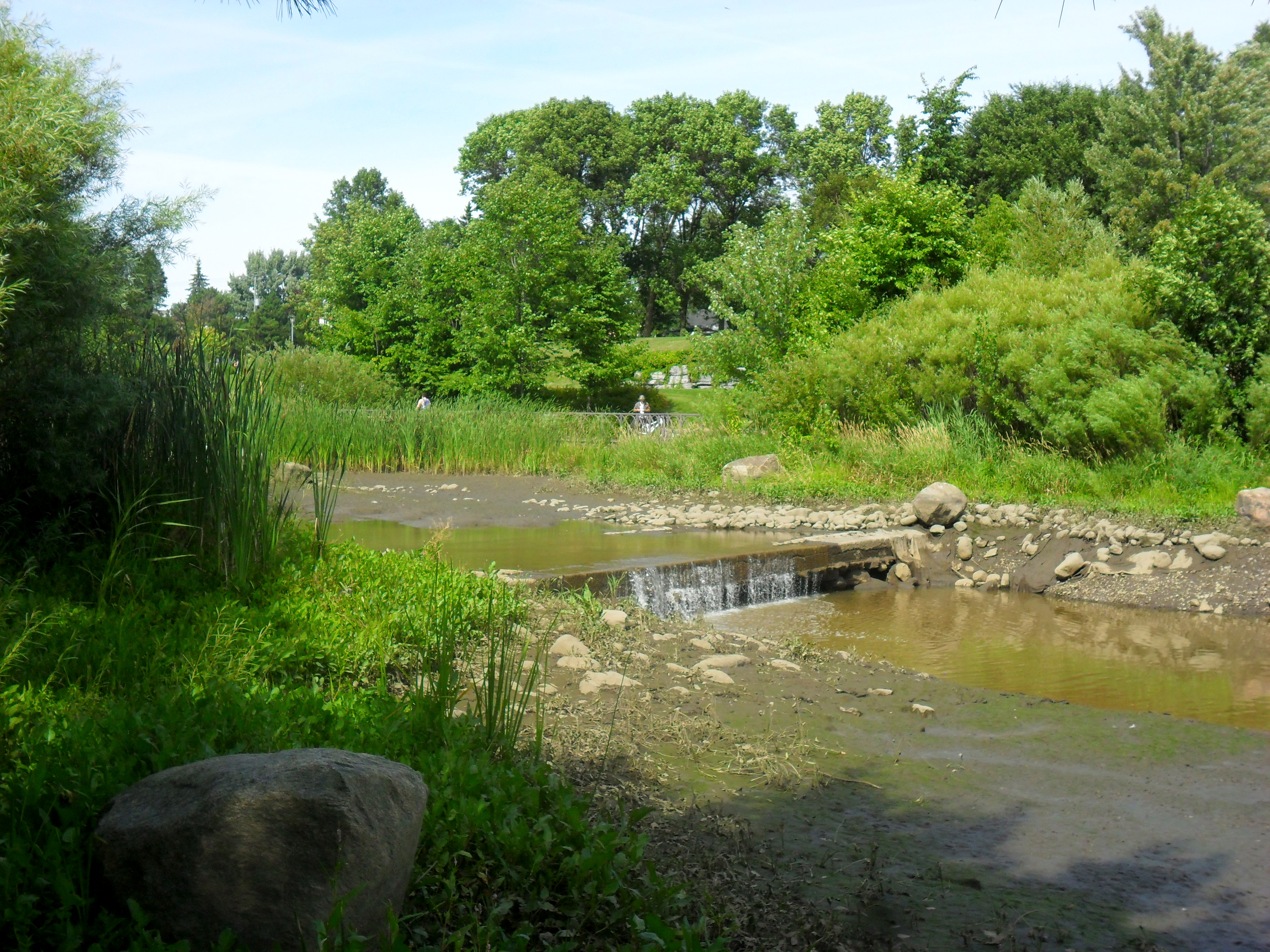
The river in 2016.

Parts of the pipeline collapsed in the 2000s in Cartier-Brébeuf Park. During these same years, Quebec City undertook the demolition of the concrete walls of the Saint-Charles river as well as the renaturalization of the banks In parallel with this work, the Lairet river pipeline is removed over a length of approximately 300 meters (980 ft), at its confluence with the Saint-Charles river. However, the majority of the course of the river is still underground. The Saint-François d'Assise hospital, originally built on the banks of the river, is nowadays struggling with water infiltration.

== Gallery ==
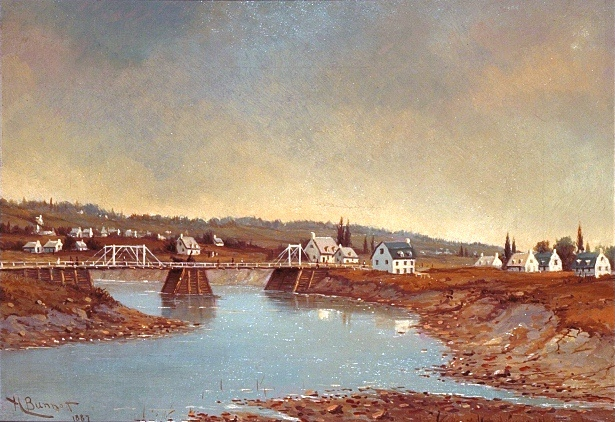
Bunnett, 1887

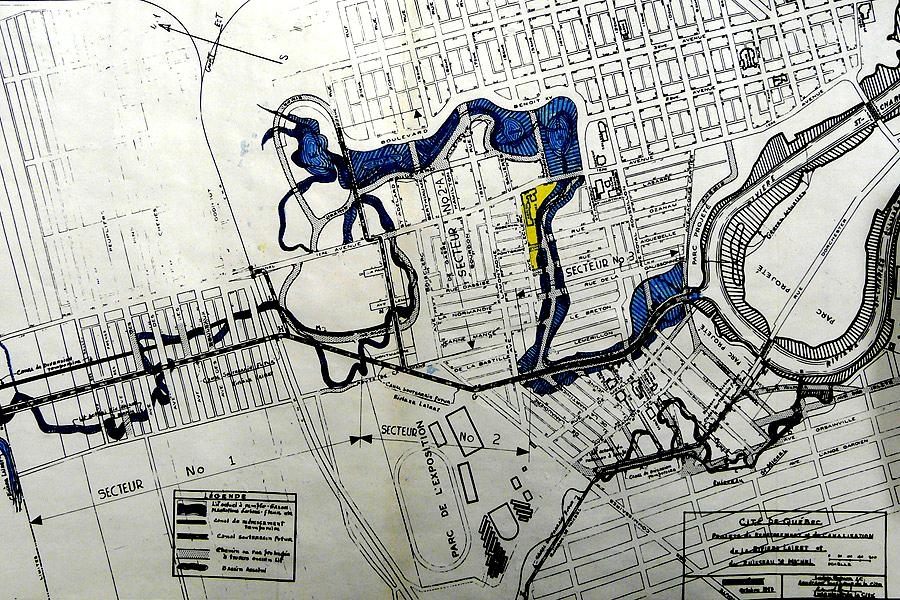
Lairet pipeline project, 1943

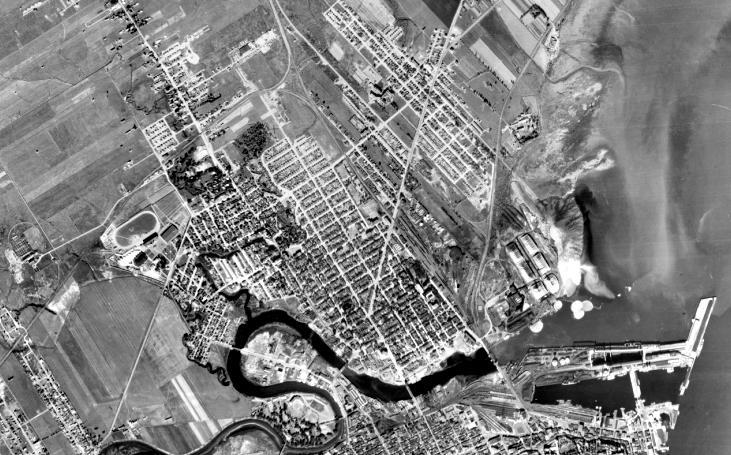
Aerial photograph of Limoilou, 1948
