= Lorette =

Lorette may refer to the following places:

== Place names ==
- Lorette River, a tributary of Saint-Charles River, in Capitale-Nationale, Quebec, Canada
- Lorette, Loire, a commune in the Loire department, France
- Lorette, Manitoba, a community in Manitoba, Canada
- Loreto, Marche, a hill town and commune in Ancona, Italy, called Lorette in French

== Others ==
Lorette is also used to describe:

- Pommes de terre Lorette, a fried potato dish from French cuisine.
- Lorette (prostitution), a type of 19c French prostitute.

== See also ==
- Notre Dame de Lorette (disambiguation)
