= Parc of the Kabir Kouba Cliff and Waterfall =

Public park in Quebec City, Quebec, Canada

Coordinates: 46°51′19″N 71°21′20″W

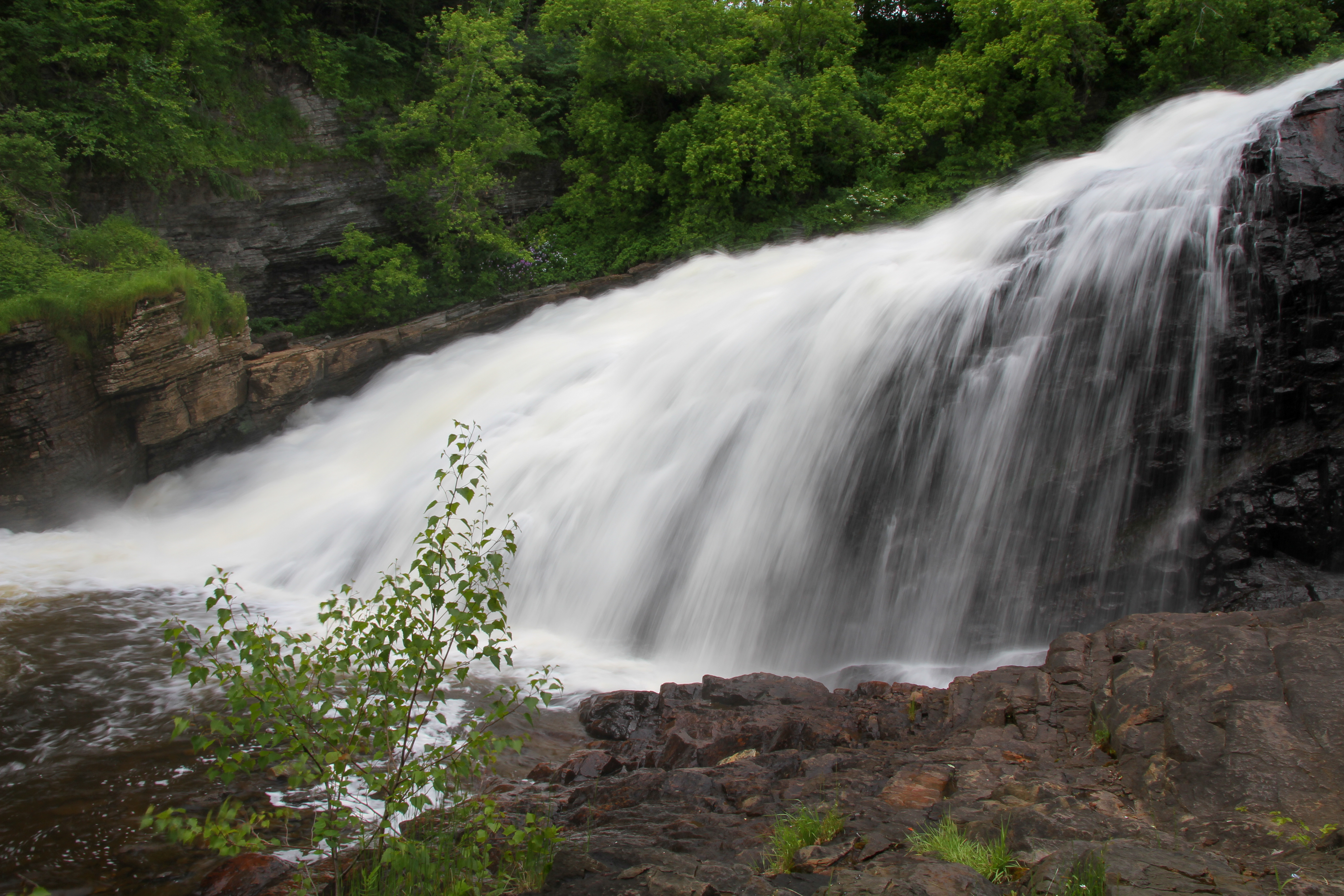
Parc of the Kabir Kouba Cliff and Waterfall

The Park of the Kabir Kouba Cliff and Waterfall (French: Parc de la falaise et de la chute Kabir Kouba) is a public park in Quebec City, Quebec crossed by the Saint-Charles River. The rapids and falls of this section of the river are called Kabir Kouba, the "river of a thousand bends" in the Montagnais language. An interpretive center and trails permit the observation of the Kabir Kouba waterfall that has a height of 28 metres. The trails also provide a view of the canyon which at its highest point measures 42 metres as well as a rich variety of flora, fauna and fossils dating over 455 million years old. The interpretive center also offers services such as Kabir Kouba by Lantern, A Day at Loretteville package as well as guided visits of the falls. A song by the singer Claire Pelletier, Kabir Kouba, evoques the many Huron legends that honour the river and the waterfall.

== Geology ==
The waterfall is the point of encounter between two geological regions: The Saint-Lawrence lowlands (the park) and the Canadian Shield (the waterfall). It's in the sedimentary rocks of the park that we are able to observe fossiles dating from the era of the Iapetus Ocean.

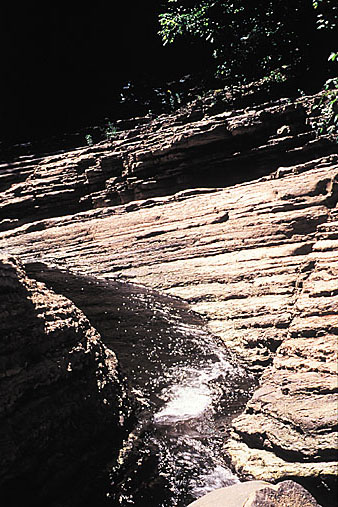
Roches sédimentaires du parc.

In the same sedimentary rocks, it is possible to observe potholes, round holes formed by the circulation rotation of small rocks. At the beginning, these small rocks are stuck in little depressions which gradually erode to form the potholes. The biggest pothole of the Park of the Kabir Kouba Cliff and Waterfall measures 5 feet deep.

Immense erratic blocks in the park were deposited on the site thousands of years ago by an enormous glacier that covered North America during the last ice age, called the Wisconsin glaciation. In the Quebec region, the glacier attained a depth of 3 km and its weight crushed the Earth's crust. That's why, 18 000 years ago, the city of Quebec was 200m below the ocean.

The canyon of the Saint-Charles river was formed after the glacier's retreat, by the erosion caused by the flowing of water from the Saint-Charles lake. The latter was formed of hard and resistant rocks, gneiss, covered by much less resistant calcareous rocks. Consequently, the water eroded the calcareous rocks until it attained the resistant gneiss which resulted in the Waterfall and 42m high canyon. The rate of erosion of the canyon was an estimated 3.33mm per year.

== Fossils ==
The Park of the Kabir Kouba Cliff and Waterfall has many fossils, the majority of which are marine organisms from the Ordovician period, date approximately 455 million years. They are contained in the sedimentary calcareous rocks of the Saint-Lawrence lowlands.

The principal groups of fossils found in the park are cephalopods, gastropods, bryzoaires, brachiopods and trilobites. Three other groups can also be discovered solenoporacees, crinoides (a part of echinoderms) and receptaculitides.

The trilobite Crypotlithus tessalatus lorettensis was discovered for the first time next to the Kabir Kouba waterfalls by the paleontologist August F. Foerste in 1924. The name lorettensis originates from Loretteville. Contrary to the majority of trilobites that possessed eyes, Crypotlithus had none.

== The Mills ==
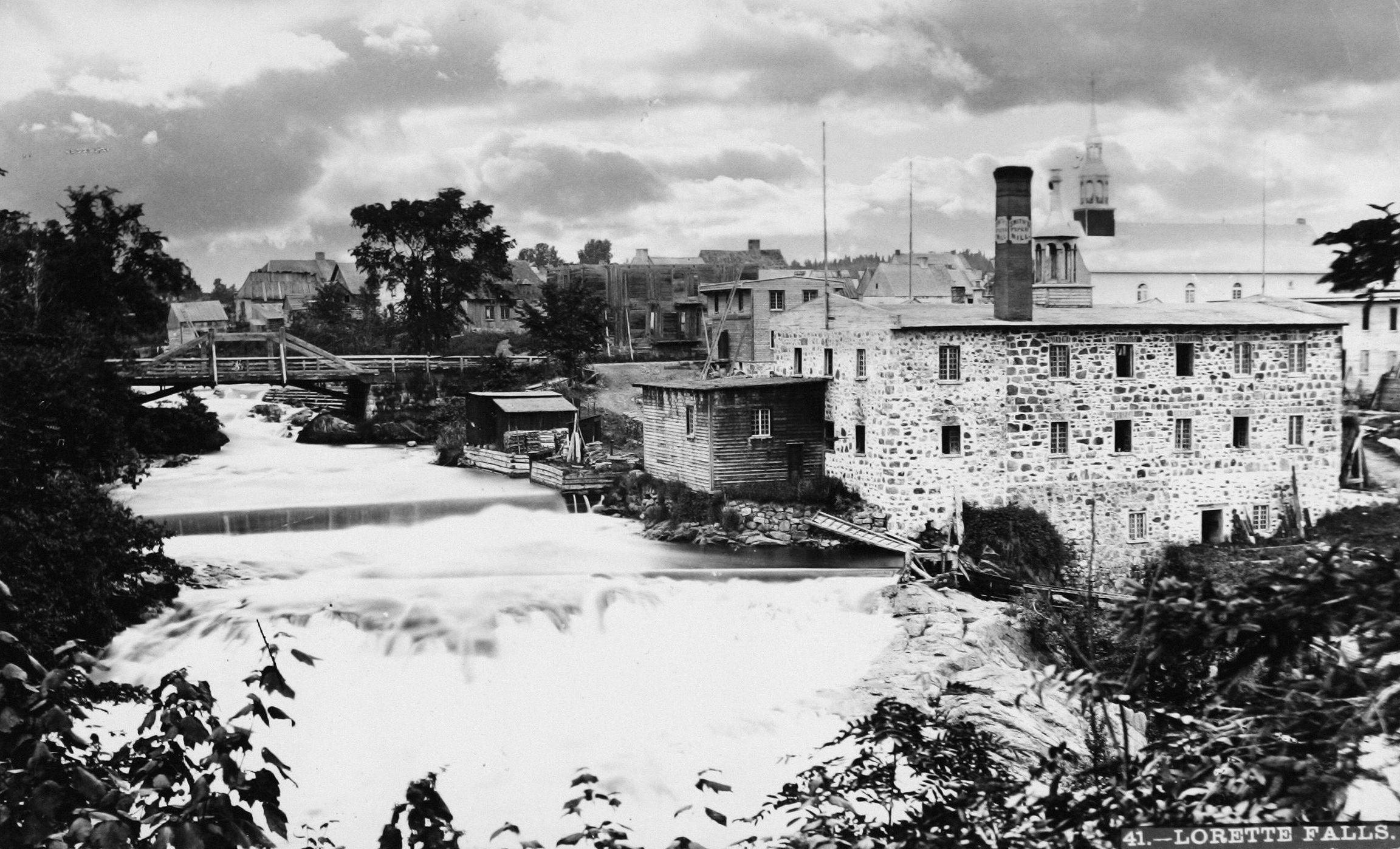
The Reid Mill, ca 1900

Next to the waterfall there are various ruins of mills. The waterfall was first exploited by the Jesuits in 1732 when they constructed a flour mill. It was a building of stone measuring 40 feet by 25 feet. A sawmill was incorporated into the north east part of the mill in 1749. In 1807, the flour mill was in bad condition, a loan of 21 years would be required to do the necessary repairs. In 1853 the mill became the property of Joseph Falardeau. After 1854, the flour mill shared the waterfall with a paper mill in the north section. The flour mill passed through many hands before finally being destroyed by a fire on August 1, 1900.

== The Interpretive Centre ==
The Interpretive Centre of the Park contains fossils, flora and fauna, paintings and documentation of the Park of the Kabir Kouba Cliff and Waterfall. The centre offers many services including guided visits of the waterfall. The Corporation of the parc of the Cliff and of the Kabir Kouba Waterfall, a non-profit organization has the mission statement of `the conservation and practice of valuing natural heritage and heritage of the park as well as the education of the public at large of this heritage.

== Photos ==
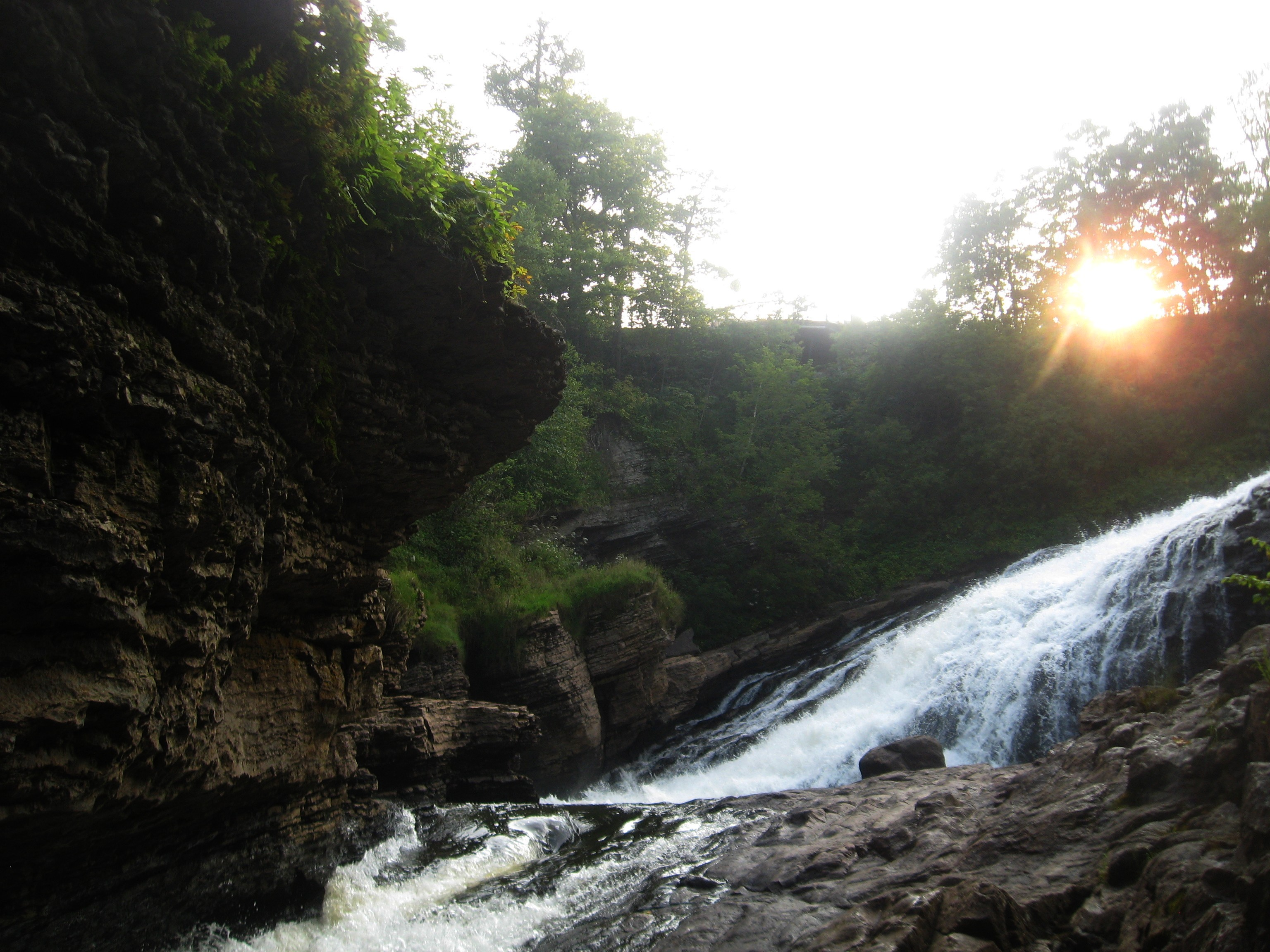
At the foot of Kabir Kouba (Loretteville, QC)

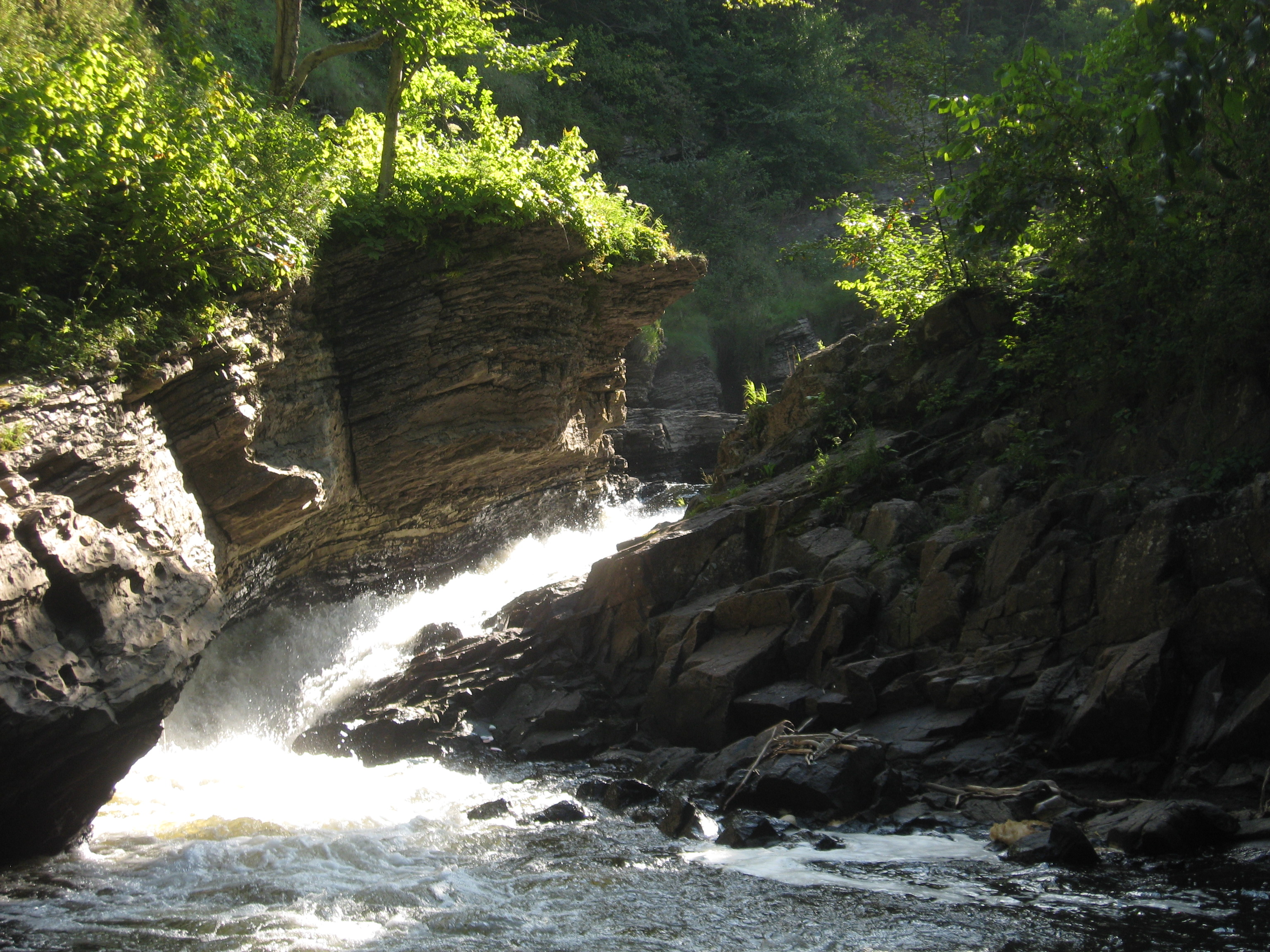
La rivière Saint-Charles au pied de la chute Kabir Kouba (Loretteville, QC)

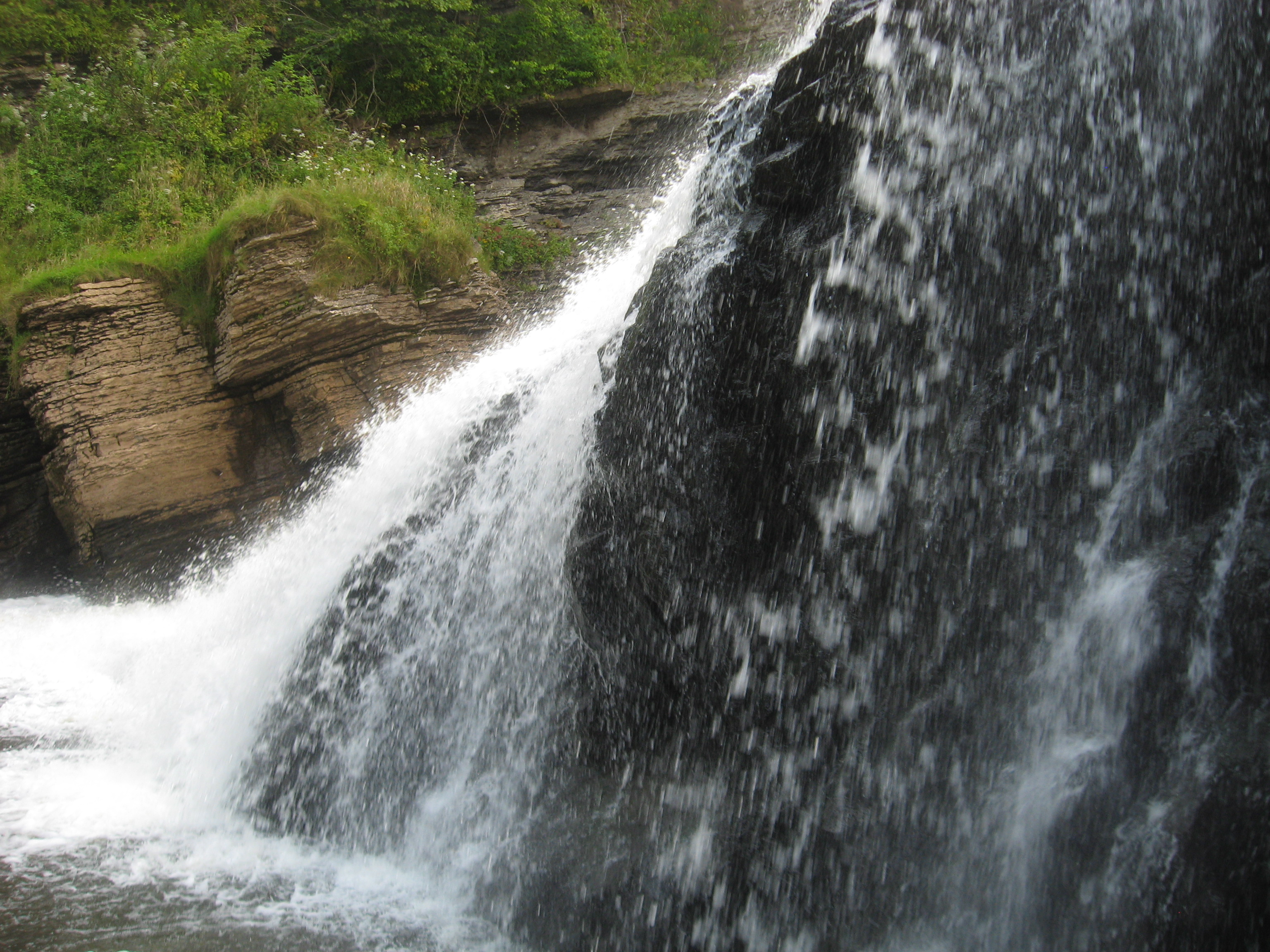
Chute Kabir Kouba vue de la faille (Loretteville, QC)

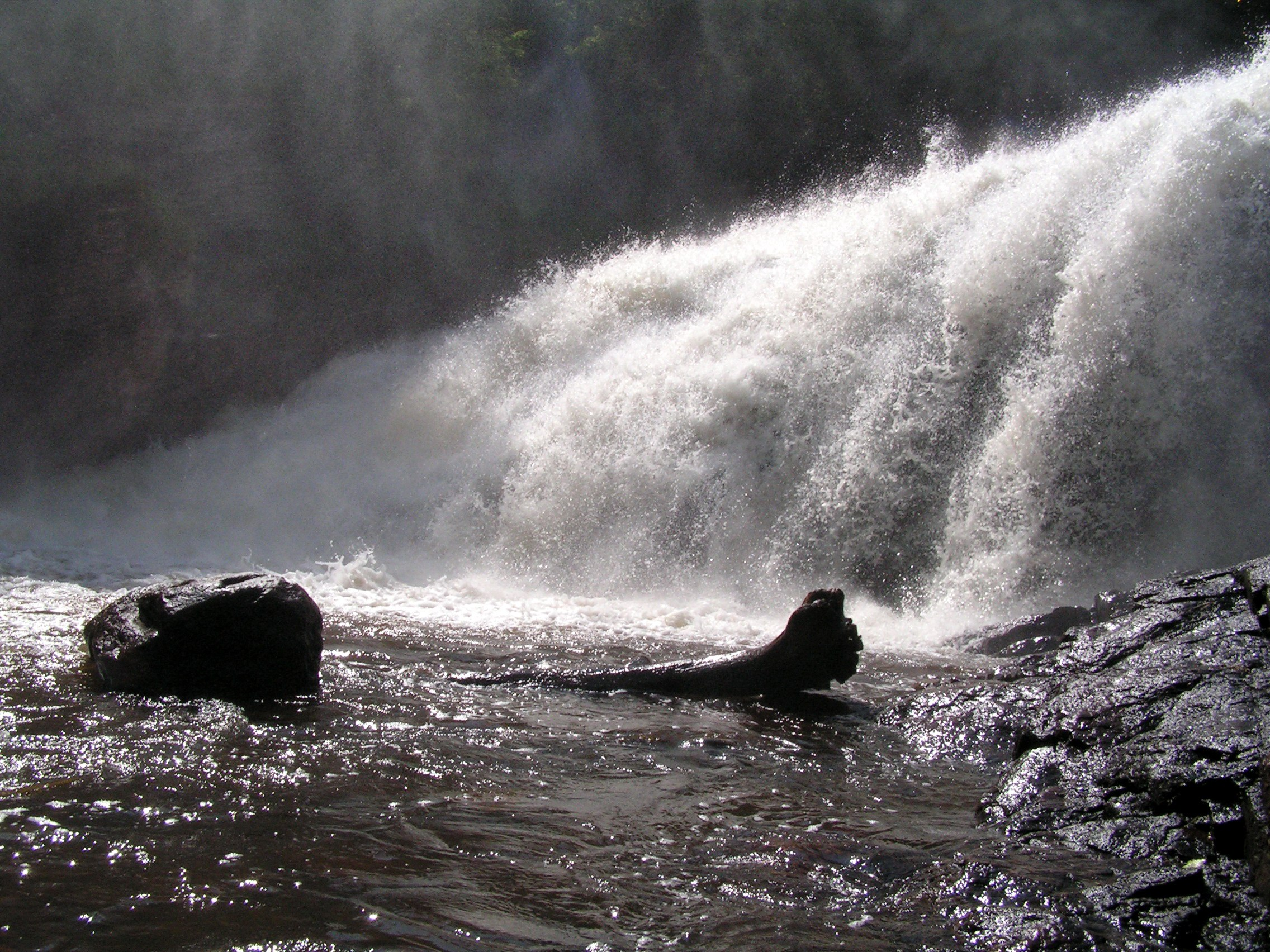
Au pied de la chute Kabir Kouba (Loretteville, QC)

== See also ==
- Rivière Saint-Charles
- Chute de Montmorency
