= Lorette River =

Lorette river
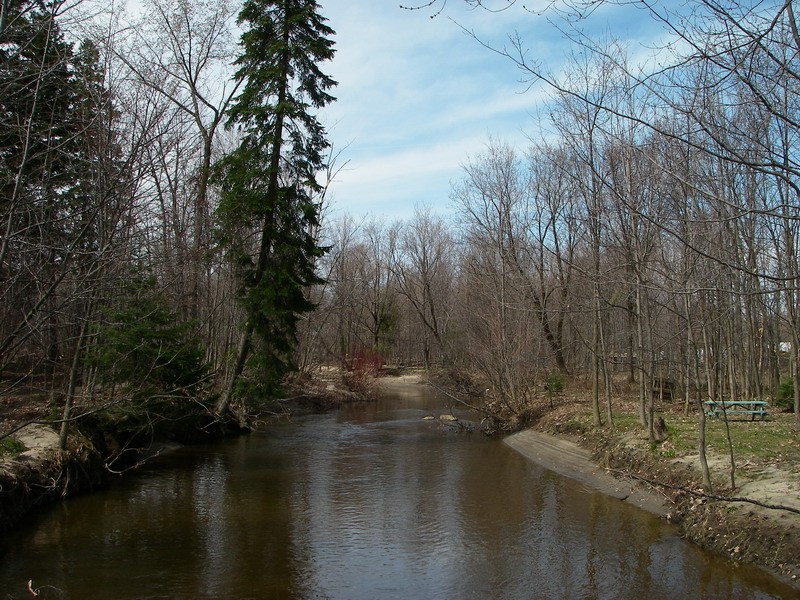
- La rivière and the Cap-Rouge trestle

- Location of the mouth of the river in Quebec City
- Native name: Rivière Lorette (French)

Location
- Country: Canada
- Province: Quebec
- Region: Capitale-Nationale
- Cities: Quebec City

Physical characteristics
- Source: Agricultural stream
  - location: L'Ancienne-Lorette
  - coordinates: 46.77832°N 71.43379°E
  - elevation: 66
- Mouth: Saint-Charles River
  - location: Quebec (city) (sector Les Saules)
  - coordinates: 46°48′30″N 71°19′04″W
  - elevation: 10 m
- Length: 23.4 km (14.5 mi)
- Basin size: 71 km^{2} (27 sq mi)

Basin features
- River system: Saint Lawrence River
- Tributaries
  - left: (Upward from the mouth) Another tributary (without toponym, but locally called stream of Souvenance), Mont-Châtel stream originating in Val-Bélair, Friches stream (also called Sainte-Geneviève stream or Martres stream).

The Lorette River is a tributary of the Saint-Charles River, crossing the sector Sainte-Foy–Sillery–Cap-Rouge and the area of L'Ancienne-Lorette in Quebec City, in the administrative region of Capitale-Nationale, in the province of Quebec, Canada.

The Lorette river valley is mainly served by various urban roads, notably the route 358 (avenue Notre-Dame), boulevard Chauveau Ouest, rue Saint-Olivier, rue Saint- Jean-Baptiste, rue Saint-Paul, route 138 (boulevard Wilfrid-Hamel), boulevard du Parc-Technologique and boulevard Masson.

The surface of the Lorette River (except the rapids areas) is generally frozen from the beginning of December to the end of March; safe circulation on the ice is generally done from the end of December to the beginning of March. The water level of the river varies with the seasons and the precipitation; the spring flood occurs in March or April.

== Geography ==
The Lorette River sub-basin occupies the southwest portion of the Saint-Charles River watershed. The main tributaries of the Lorette river are the Friches stream (also called Sainte-Geneviève stream or Martres stream), Mont-Châtel stream originating in Val-Bélair and another tributary (without toponym, but locally called Souvenance stream) which rises at mont Bélair. The other tributaries are mainly agricultural drainage ditches. Land use essentially divides them into three distinct occupations: cultivated land, woodlands and urbanized areas.

The Lorette river is 18 kilometres (11 mi) in length and its watershed covers an area of 71 square kilometres (27 sq mi). The course of the Lorette river descends on 23.4 kilometres (14.5 mi), with a drop of 56 metres (184 ft), according to the following segments:

- 2.7 kilometres (1.7 mi) northeasterly in a straight line in the agricultural zone, crossing rang des Beaumont and route Jean-Gauvin, to route 358 (avenue Notre-Dame), either in the hamlet Les Grands-Déserts;
- 3.0 kilometres (1.9 mi) towards the northeast along the west side of route 358, ie passing on the west side of Jean-Lesage international airport, collecting two streams (coming from the north), then winding up to the airport road;
- 2.4 kilometres (1.5 mi) towards the north-east by crossing the Étienne-Lessard street, by collecting the Friches stream (coming from the north), up to the boulevard Chauveau Ouest.
- 3.0 kilometres (1.9 mi) towards the east entering Quebec City and collecting Ruisseau du Mont Châtel (coming from the north-west) at the start of the segment, then by forming a big curve towards the south in an urban forest area, until at a bend in the river;
- 7.7 kilometres (4.8 mi) towards the south by forming a large loop towards the west in an urban park, by winding by cutting the rue Saint-Jean-Baptiste, by bifurcating towards the east while continuing to wind, by collecting a stream (coming from the southwest), up to route 138 (boulevard Wilfrid-Hamel);
- 3.0 kilometres (1.9 mi) to the east, forming a large hook to the north, passing through the Carrefour-Du-Commerce industrial zone, to the autoroute 73 (Autoroute Henri-IV)
- 1.6 kilometres (0.99 mi) towards the north by forming a loop towards the west and another towards the east and crossing the boulevard du Parc Technologique, the route 138 (boulevard Wilfrid-Hamel) and boulevard Masson, to its mouth.

The Lorette river flows in a river curve on the southwest shore of the Saint-Charles River, in the Les Saules sector, district of Quebec city.

From this confluence, the current descends on 12.5 kilometres (7.8 mi) generally towards the northeast, following the course of the Saint-Charles river.

== Hydrography ==
The general water quality index (from 0 to 100, 100 being a good quality generally allowing all uses including swimming) in the watershed of the Lorette river varies from upstream (60 to 79, quality satisfactory generally allowing most uses) downstream (0 to 19, very poor quality, all uses risk being compromised). In the Lorette River, the rate of fecal coliforms from agricultural and urban waste is very high.

The Lorette River is also a victim of erosion problems. The massive deforestation of the shores in agricultural areas and the waterproofing of soils in urban areas accentuate the phenomenon of bank erosion, especially during heavy rains. In several places, you can see soil left bare at the edge of the river and banks damaged by erosion. Besides the degradation of the banks, the runoff water also brings about the most fertile part of the soil made up of silt, clay and organic matter (in agricultural environment) and pours it into the Lorette river without meet the slightest natural barrier to limit the impact of this phenomenon. The sediments transported to the river, once in suspension, increase the turbidity of the waters and cause physiological stress to the aquatic fauna.

Historically, the Lorette River has always experienced periods of overflow. However, since the beginning of the territory's urbanization, this natural phenomenon has been greatly accentuated. We now observe significant variations in flow during heavy rains and the overflows have significant consequences on nearby infrastructure and buildings.

== Toponymy ==
At the beginning of the French colony in Canada, this winding river bore the name that the Jesuit father Pierre-Joseph-Marie Chaumonot attributed, in 1673, to the Lorette mission established for the Wendats (Hurons), near Quebec.

As early as 1686, Robert de Villeneuve indicated Rivière de Lorette on a map. This stream also bore the name of Ruisseau Lorette, sometimes spelled Laurette or L'aurette, and that of Petite rivière Saint-Charles. See: L'Ancienne-Lorette (ville).

The toponym "Lorette river" was formalized on December 5, 1968 at the Commission de toponymie du Québec.

== Notes and references ==
- Brodeur, C., F. Lewis, E. Huet-Alegre, Y. Ksouri, M.-C. Leclerc and D. Viens. 2007. Portrait of the Saint-Charles river basin. Saint-Charles river basin council. 216 p + 9 annexes 217-340 pp

== See also ==
- Quebec City
- Sainte-Foy–Sillery–Cap-Rouge, a sector of Quebec city
- L'Ancienne-Lorette, Quebec
- Saint-Charles River
- List of rivers of Quebec
