= Notre Dame de Lorette (disambiguation) =

Notre Dame de Lorette is a military cemetery in France.

Notre Dame de Lorette may also refer to:

- Notre-Dame-de-Lorette station, a Paris Metro station
- Notre-Dame-de-Lorette, Paris, a church in Paris
- Notre-Dame-de-Lorette, Quebec, a municipality in Quebec, Canada
- Notre Dame de Lorette, a church in Lorette, Manitoba, Canada
