= Cartier-Brébeuf National Historic Site =

Historic site in Quebec City, Quebec

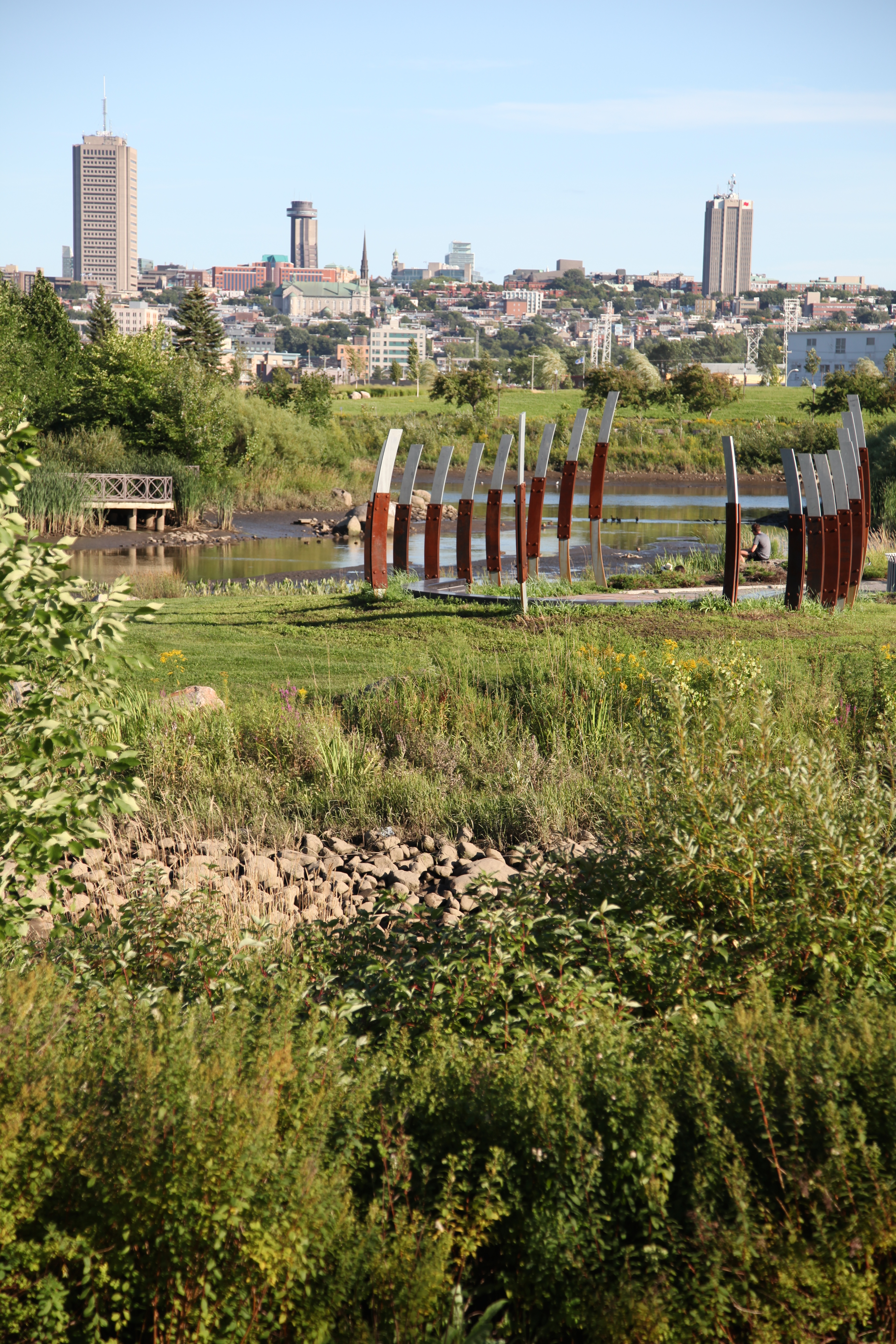
- Interactive map of Cartier-Brébeuf National Historic Site
- 46.8253°N 71.2396°W
- Type: Urban park
- Location: 175, rue de l'Espinay; Quebec City, Quebec; G1L 4W6

Site notes
- Governing body: Parks Canada
- Owner: Parks Canada

Cartier-Brébeuf National Historic Site (French: Site historique national Cartier-Brébeuf) is a National Historic Site of Canada and so designated by the Historic Sites and Monuments board of Canada in 1958 under the recommendation of John Diefenbaker, the Prime Minister of Canada at the time. It is administered by Parks Canada and located at the confluence of Saint-Charles and Lairet rivers, in Quebec City, Quebec, Canada, more precisely in La Cité-Limoilou borough. On the site you can find an interpretation centre and a 6,8 hectares inner-city park characterised by an uneven landscape and divided into two sectors "East" and "West" separated by the Lairet river. Several commemorative monuments and elements are also present.

The site commemorates the second voyage of Jacques Cartier; more precisely in 1535-1536 when he and his shipmates wintered near the Iroquoian village of Stadacona (Quebec City). It also recalls the establishment of the first residence of the Jesuit missionaries in Quebec, in 1625–1626.

Moreover, by the end of the 17th century up to the opening of the national historic site in 1972, it hosted numerous hand-crafted and industrial activities such as a tannery, a pottery, a brickyard, a shipyard, a sawmill, a junkyard and a snow-dumping lot.

Today, the site offers a museum exhibition, animations for elementary and high school groups, thematic events, and a natural habitat in an inner-city park. A cycleway and the linear park of Saint-Charles River also cross the park's ground.

== Jacques Cartier's stay and wintering in Sainte-Croix Harbor in 1535–1536 ==
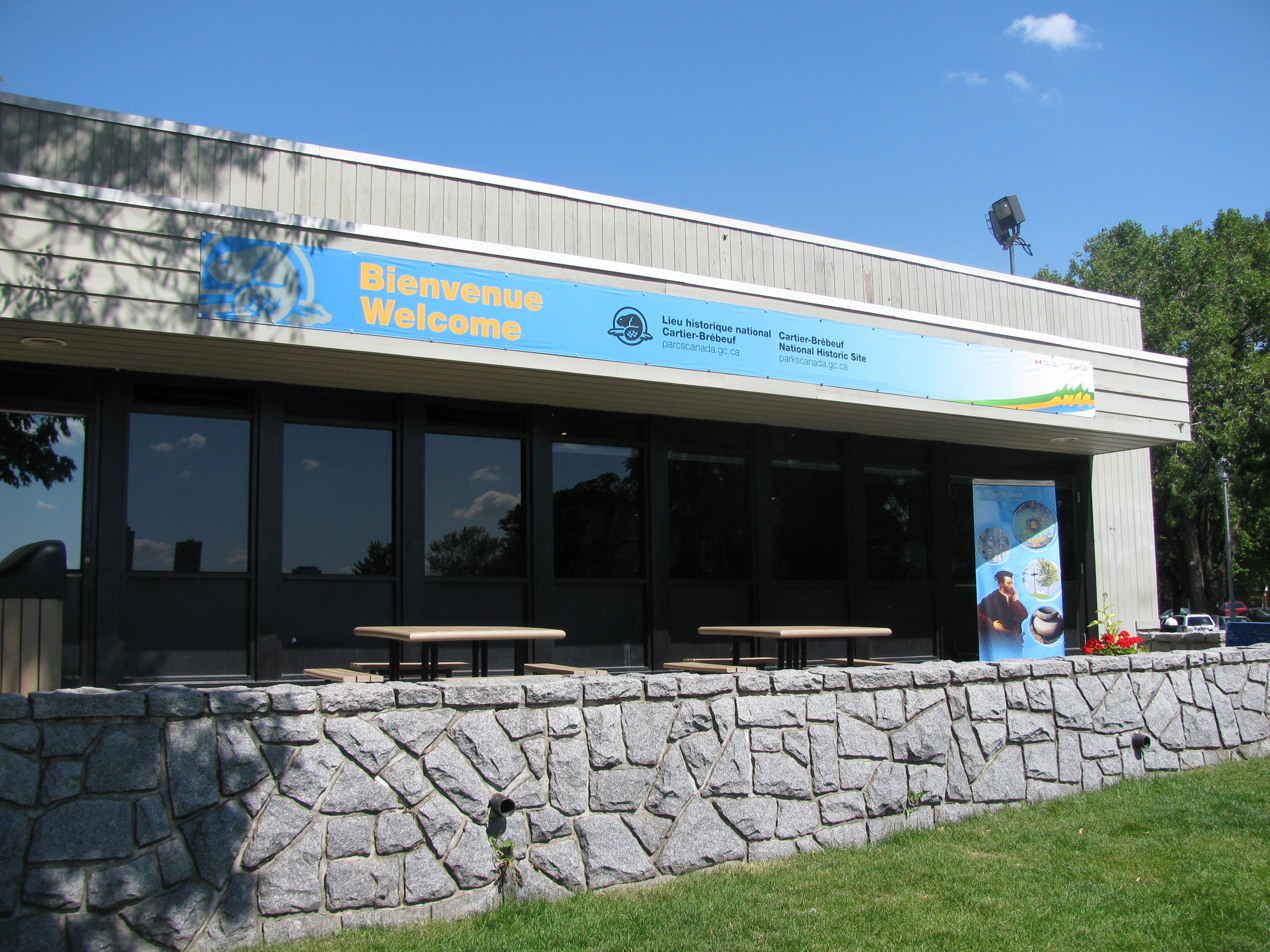
Interpretation Center

During his second voyage in Canada, Jacques Cartier still believed that the Saint Lawrence River could lead him through the continent to Asia. When he realized that the river narrows near Quebec City, he started searching for a harbor to leave his two largest ships, Grande Hermine and Petite Hermine, and to continue on exploring on board of Émerillon to Hochelaga (Montreal). On September 8, 1553, Cartier found a harbor which he thought most adequate which he named Sainte-Croix (holy cross) located at the confluence of Saint-Charles and Lairet rivers near Stadacona, the Iroquoian village. Back from his trip, Cartier realized that his shipmates had built a small fort around the ships because they now feared the Stadaconeans. The French captain decided to winter at the confluence of Saint-Charles and Lairet rivers. Unprepared for the harshness of the Canadian winter, Cartier and his crew chose to inhabit in the ships' steerage rather than building shelters in which they would have been better isolated from the cold temperature. This decision turned out to be disastrous. The winter of 1535–1536 turned out to be deadly for the crew; 106 out of 110 men caught scurvy, out of which 25 of them died and their remains were probably buried on the site. The other ones were saved by annedda, an infusion of a Canadian conifer (either the white cedar or the balsam fir), for which the Iroquoians knew the recipe. Before heading back to France in spring 1536, Cartier erected a cross in honor of Francis I of France on which he wrote: "Franciscus primus, dei gratia francorum rex, regnat" (Long live Francis I by God's grace king of the France). At the time of departure, Cartier had to leave Petite Hermine in Sainte-Croix harbour because he did not have enough sailors to navigate. He also took with him 10 Iroquoians from Stadacona. Five years went by before Cartier could return to Canada. In 1541, he chose to settle in Cap-Rouge for strategic reasons, a location that he named Charlesbourg-Royal.

== Proofs of Jacques Cartier's stay in Sainte-Croix Harbor ==
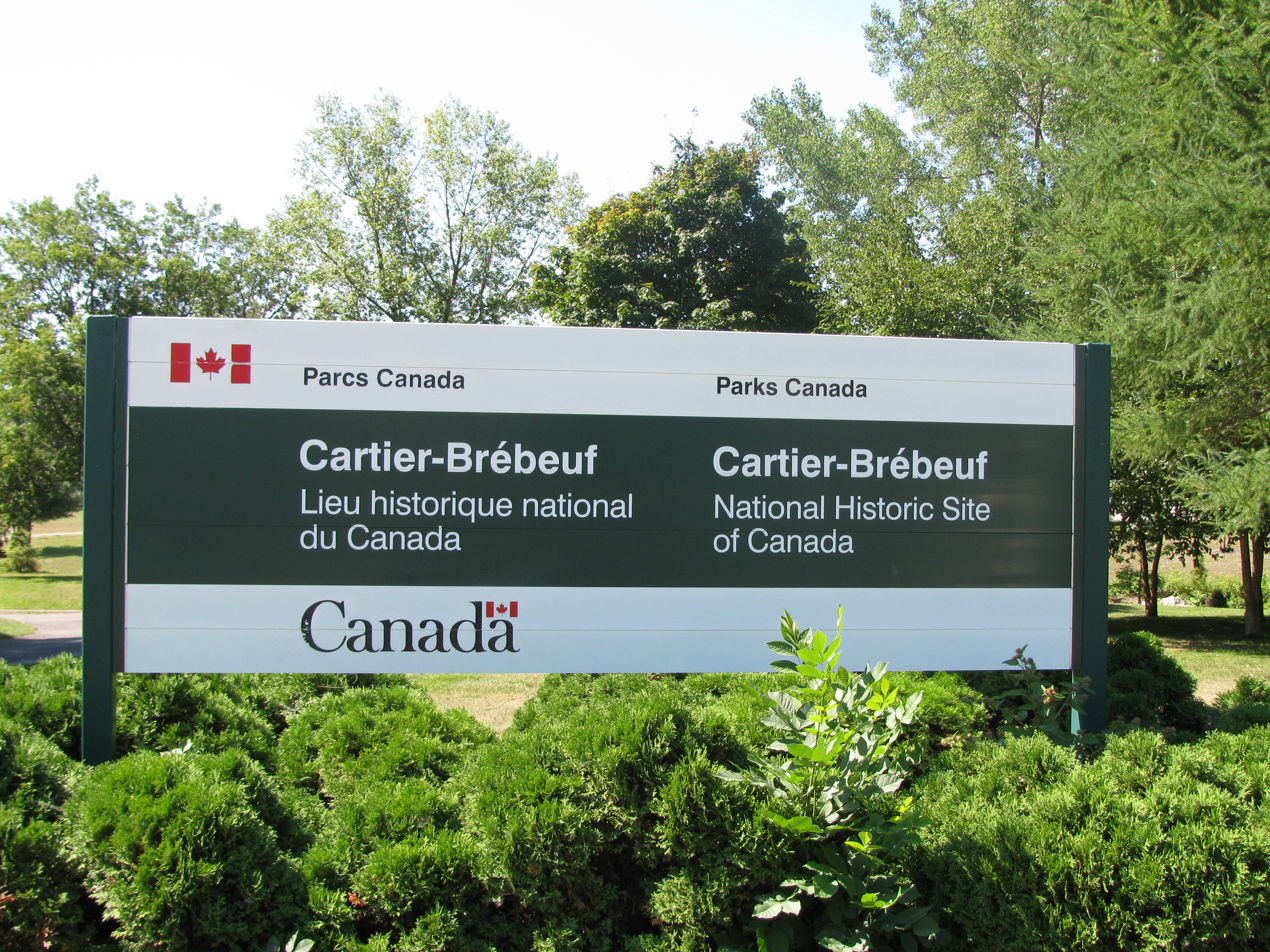

In order to find artifacts from Jacques Cartier's presence in 1535-1536 and from the Notre-Dame-des-Anges residence, archeological excavations were made in the years 1959, 1962, 1986, 1993, 2004, 2007. Probably because of the numerous changes in the ground due to human activities which were held on the site, traces have not yet been discovered. However, archeologists found many objects related to hand-crafted or industrial activities dating from New-France onward. The most relevant items which have yet to be found are the graves of 25 deceased sailors and the remains of the small fort and the ditches.

Proofs of his stay therefore consist of written attestations by Jacques Cartier and Samuel de Champlain.

Jacques Cartier wrote:

"And we went some ten leagues up the river, coasting this island [of Orleans] at the end of which we came to a forking of the waters, which is an exceedingly pleasant spot where there's a small river and a harbor a bar, […]. We thought this river St-Charles a suitable place in which to lay up our ships in safety. We named it 'St-Croix', as we arrive there that day"

Samuel de Champlain wrote:

"Moreover, near Quebec, there's little river, coming from the lake in the interior distant 6 or 7 leagues distant from or settlement . I am of opinion that this river (st-charles), which is North quarter North-West from our settlement, is a place where Jacques Cartier wintered, since there are still, a leak of the river remains of what seems to have been a cheminey, the foundation of which has been found and indications of there having been ditches surrounding there dwelling which was small."

== The Jesuits and the Notre-Dame-des-Anges residence ==
It is also at the confluence of the Saint-Charles and Lairet rivers that a group of five Jesuit missionaries settle in 1625 with the objective of evangelizing the natives. This was the first settlement of the Society of Jesus in Quebec. The group was composed of fathers Jean de Brébeuf, Énemond Massé and Charles Lalement and also coadjutor brothers François Chartoin and Gilbert Burel. They named their residence Notre-Dame-des-Anges. It consisted of two buildings: the first one made of wood planks 13 metres wide and 7.5 metres long and the second, slightly smaller which was used as a barn, stable and a joiner's workshop. They had to leave their land in 1629 when the Kirke brothers took over Quebec City. The Jesuits only came back in 1632 and realized that their buildings were partially destroyed. In 1636 they rebuilt their residence and increased its size to host the Huron seminary until 1639.

== Hand-crafted and industrial activities ==
From 1688 to the beginning of the 1970s many hand-crafting and industrial activities were held on the location of National Historic Site Cartier-Brébeuf. Here is an exhaustive list by chronological order.

- Landron-L'archevêque brickyard from 1688 to 1714
- L'archevêque from 1702 to 1722
- Marie-Anne Barbel pottery from 1746 to 1752
- George Holmes-Parke shipyard: circa 1840
- Edmond-Ovide Richard sawmill from 1863 to 1867
- Cléophas Rochette brickyard from 1867 to 1930
- Arsenault junkyard from 1941 to 1958
- Municipal snow-dumping lot from 1959 to the beginning of the 1970s

== Evolution into a National Historic Site ==
In the 19th century, before the establishment of the National Historic Site Cartier-Brébeuf, interests toward the creation of a site to commemorate the second voyage of Jacques Cartier grew among the population of Quebec City. Here is a list of the important steps in the history of the site:

1835: Erection of a wooden cross commemorating the second voyage of Jacques Cartier in front the hôpital de la Marine on the south shore of the Saint-Charles river (no longer existing today)

1886: The Quebec City Catholic Circle acquires the grounds

1888: Erection of a new metal cross commemorating the second voyage of Jacques Cartier in 1535-1536 by the Quebec City Catholic Circle. (This cross is still standing today)

1920: Inauguration of the Cartier-Jesuits monument

1926: Lighting of the cross

1957: The site is visited by former Prime Minister John Diefenbaker who later asked the Historic Sites and Monuments board of Canada to recognize the historic value of the site.

1958: The site is deemed historically important by the Historic Sites and Monuments board of Canada

1959: The federal government acquires the ground and the first archaeological excavations are made (west shore of the Lairet river)

1962: Archeological excavations (east shore of the Lairet river)

1969: Channelization of the Lairet river and archeological excavation

1970: The cross is moved to another place on the site

1972: Construction of the site, installation of the Grande Hermine replica and opening of the interpretation center

1984: New lighting of the cross and benediction by pope John Paul II

1985: The first long house is built and destroyed the same year by a criminal fire

1986-1987: The second long house is built along with its palisade. The Grande-Hermine replica is placed on dry dock and its masts are removed. Archeological excavations are performed near the long house

October 11, 1987: Unveiling of the steles: The meeting of two cultures in the 16th century and the unveiling of the Donnacona commemorative plaque

1993: Archeological excavations (east of the Lairet River). Justifications: new hypothesis on the location of Jacques Cartier wintering

1996: Unveiling of the second commemorative plaque for Donaconna in three languages: English, French and Huron

2001: The Grande-Hermine replica is removed under the supervision of archeologists and the Jesuit stand is installed

2003: Landslide over the Lairet River channel

2004: Archeological excavations: wood pieces dating from earlier than Jacques Cartier are discovered

2007: The long house is demolished in order to repair the Lairet River channelization and archeological excavations are performed

2008-2009: Major work is done to revitalize the site and bring the Lairet back to daylight

2010: Complete reopening of the site, celebrations commemorating the 475th anniversary of Jacques Cartier's second voyage and installation of new interpretation panels

== Elements on the site ==
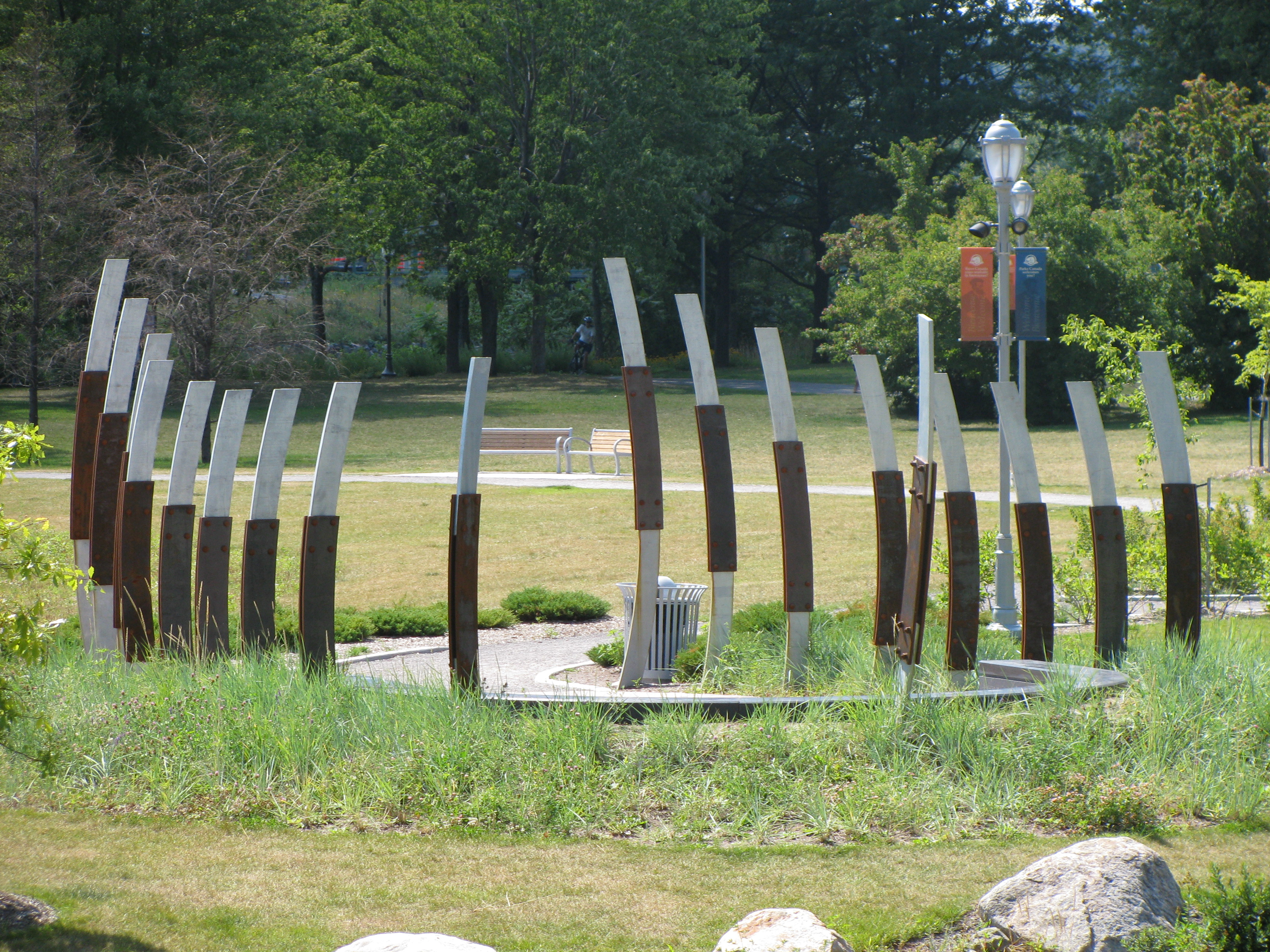
Contemporary representation of the Petite Hermine

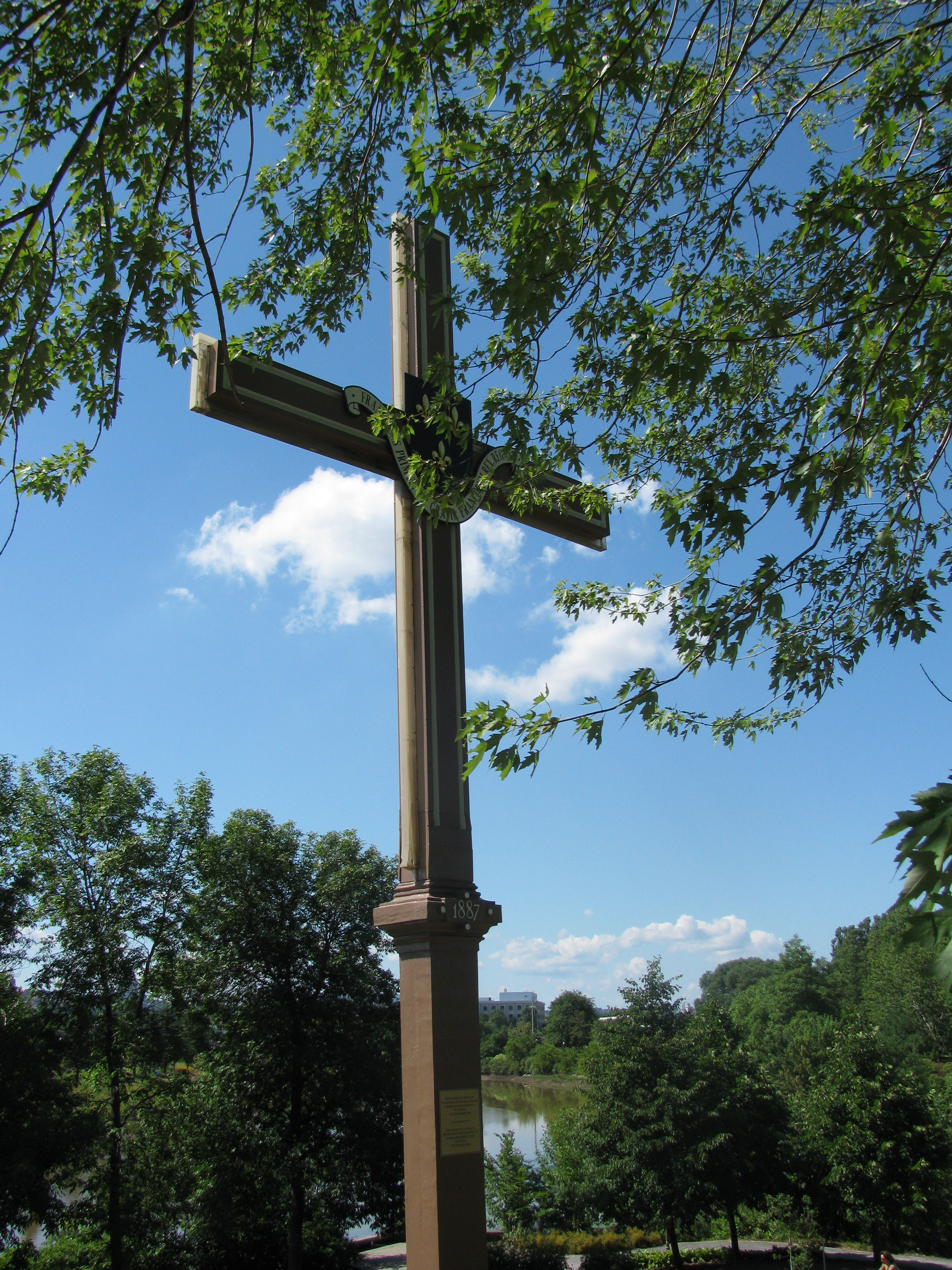
Representation of the cross erected by Jacques Cartier in 1536

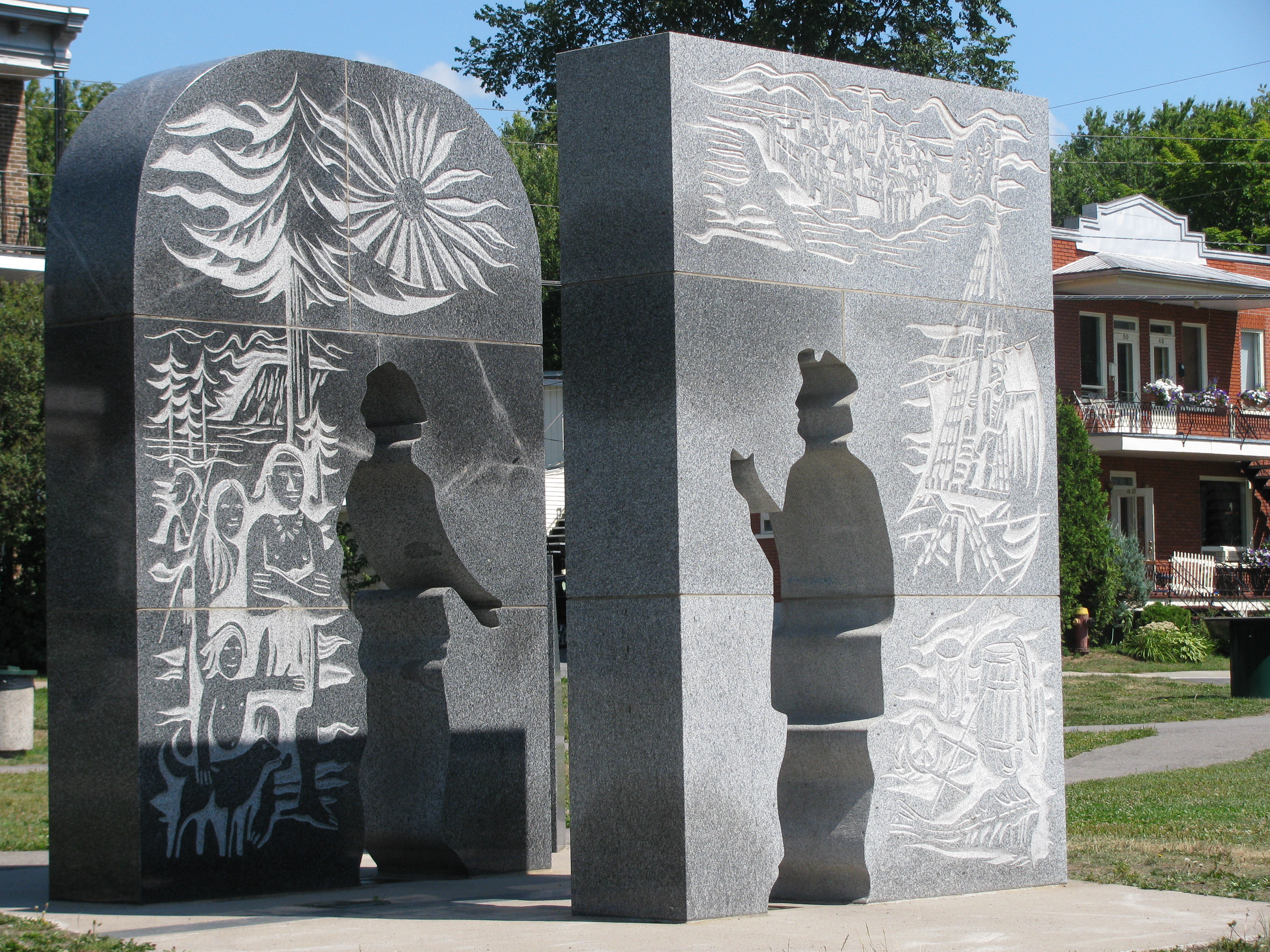
Steles of the meeting of two cultures in the 16th century

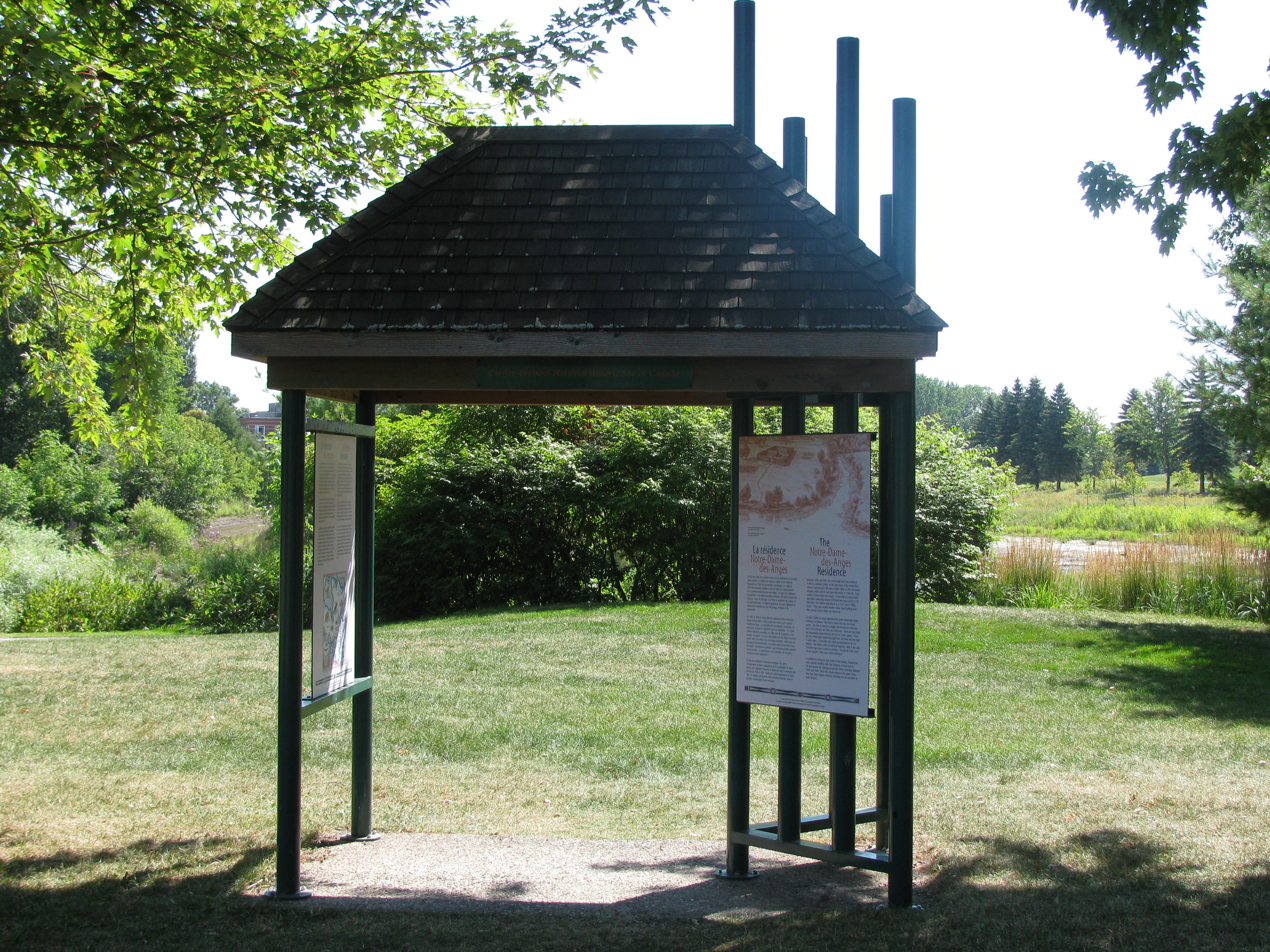
Jesuit stand

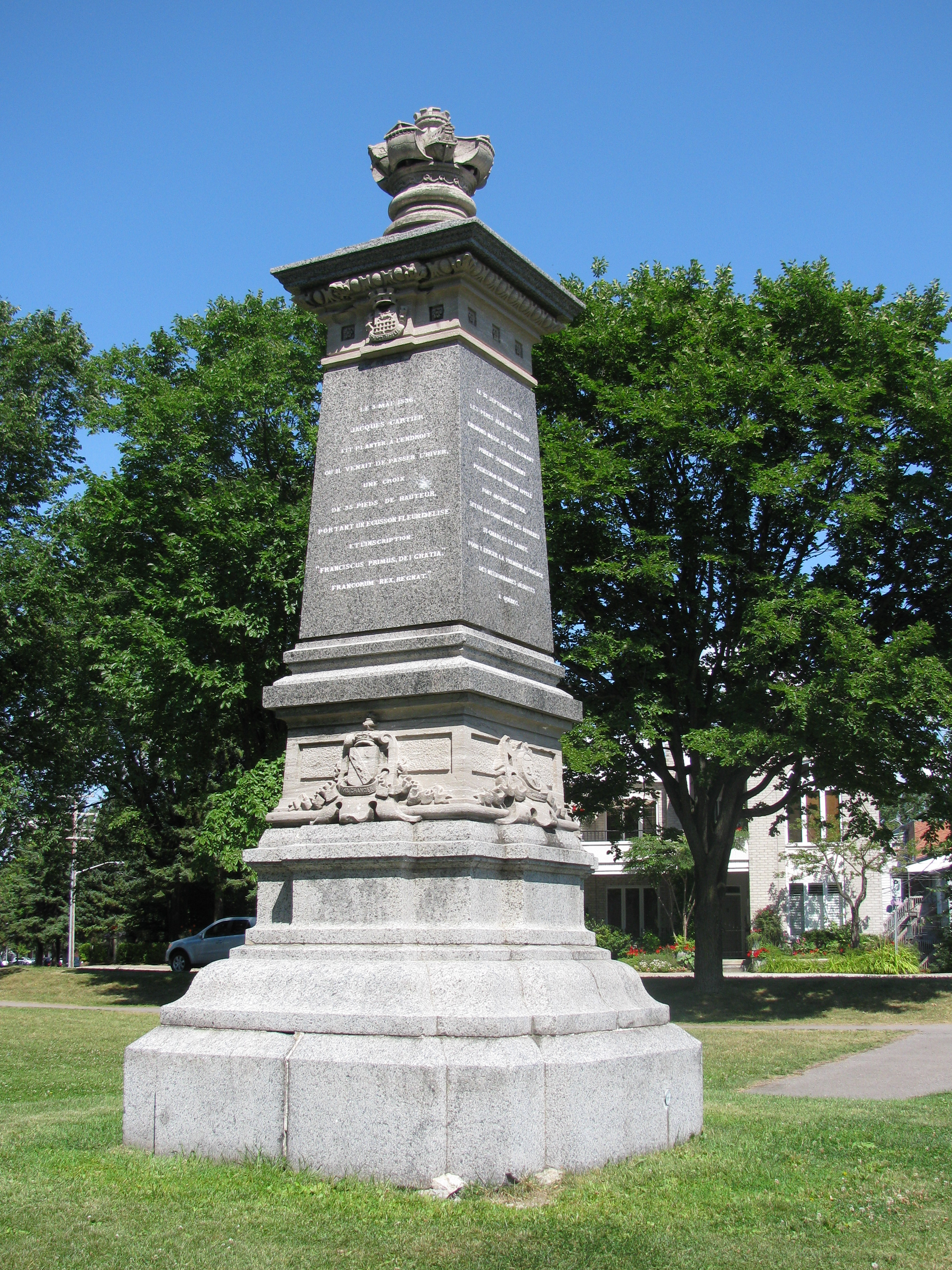
Cartier-Jesuits monument

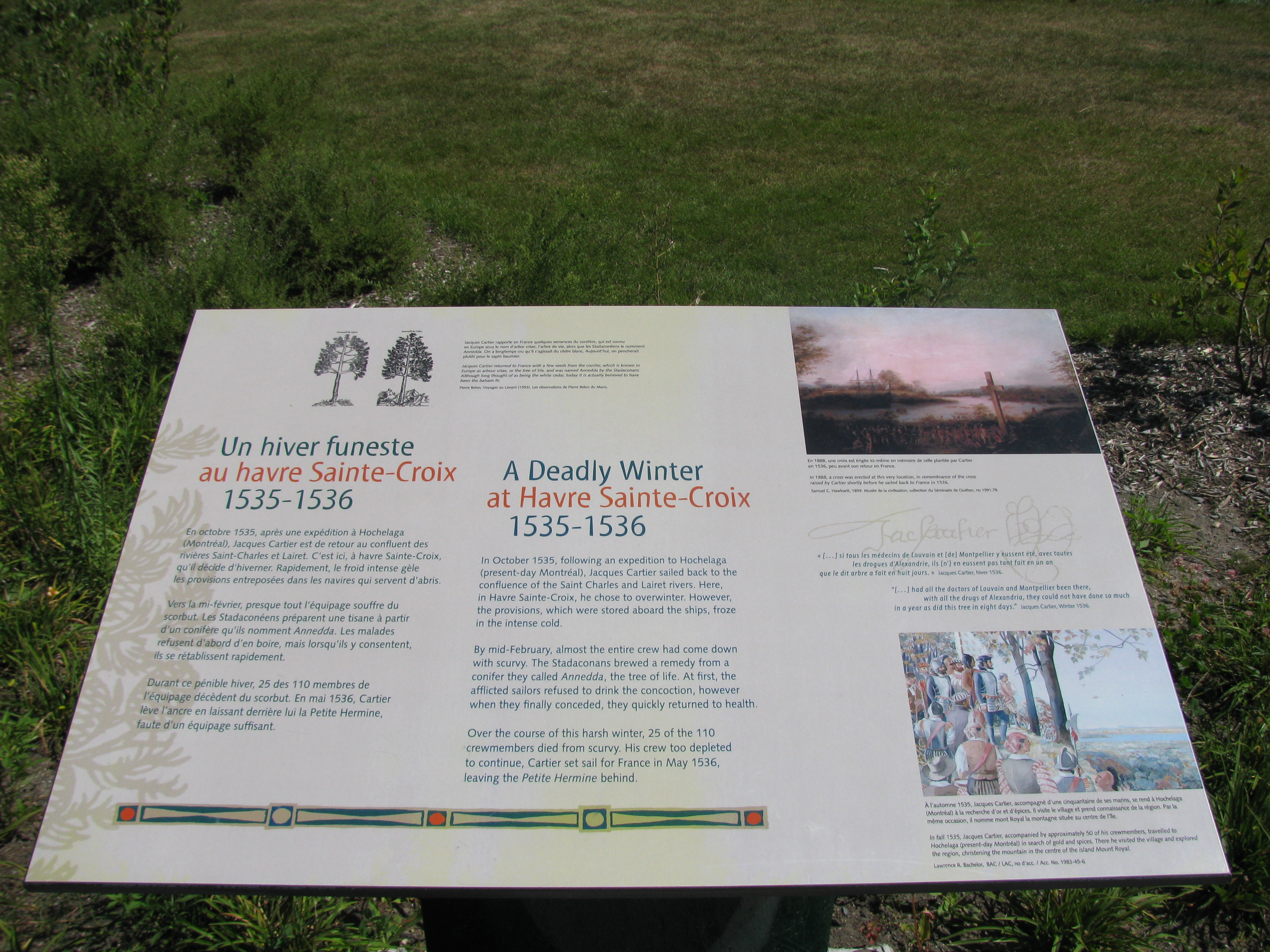
One of the interpretation panels

== Elements removed from the site ==
From the opening of the site in 1972 up to 2001, a replica of Grande Hermine was exposed on the site. It was built in 1966 by the Davie Brothers on the south shore of Quebec City for the 1967 Universal Exposition in Montreal. The replica was placed in an artificial lake until 1987, when it was placed on dry dock and its masts were removed. It was left outside of water until 2001, when it was demolished, after being exposed for 29 years, because it was becoming dangerous.

Two long houses were built on the location of the National Historic Site Cartier-Brébeuf to represent the type of building the Saint-Lawrence Iroquoian lived in. The first one was built in 1985 and it was destroyed the same year by a criminal fire. The second one, surrounded by a palisade, was built in 1986-1987 and was dismantled in 2007 in order to leave place for the new lay out.
