= Saint-Charles River (Quebec City) =

River in Quebec City in Canada

Saint Charles River Akiawenrahk
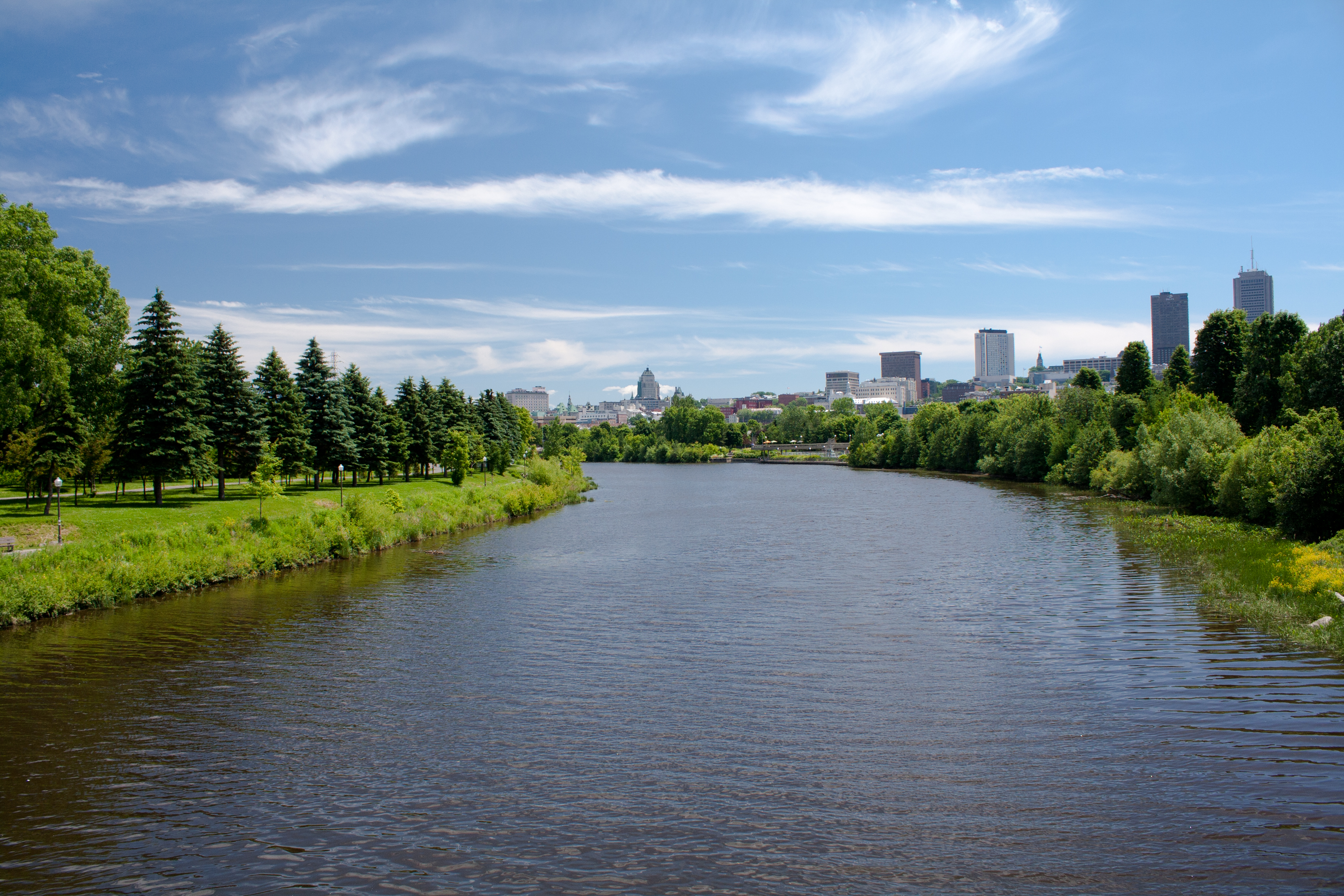
- Saint-Charles River seen from Drouin bridge

Location
- Country: Canada
- Province: Quebec
- Region: Capitale-Nationale
- City: Quebec City

Physical characteristics
- Source: Saint-Charles Lake
  - location: Quebec City
  - coordinates: 46.94111°N 71.38722°W
  - elevation: 152 m (499 ft)
- Mouth: Estuary of Saint Lawrence
  - location: Quebec City
  - coordinates: 46.826988°N 71.197672°W
  - elevation: 4 m (13 ft)
- Length: 33 km (21 mi)
- Basin size: 550 km^{2} (210 sq mi)

Basin features
- Tributaries
  - left: (Upward from the mouth) Lairet basin outlet, rivière du Berger, unidentified stream, Beaudin stream, unidentified stream, unidentified stream, unidentified stream, discharge from a small unidentified lake, Jaune River (Saint-Charles River), Valet stream.
  - right: (Upward from the mouth) Lorette River, Sainte-Barbe stream, discharge of eight small lakes, Nelson River, Eaux Fraiches stream.

The Saint-Charles River (Wendat: Akiawenrahk) is the main watercourse crossing Quebec City, Quebec, Canada.

The surface of the Saint-Charles River (except the rapids areas) is generally frozen from the beginning of December to the end of March; however, safe circulation on the ice is generally done from the end of December to the beginning of March. The water level of the river varies with the seasons and the precipitation; the spring flood occurs in March or April.

== Geography ==
It springs from Saint-Charles Lake, follows a course of approximately 33 km (21 mi) and ends into Saint Lawrence River. Its drainage basin is 550 km^{2} (210 sq mi) large and a population of 350,000 persons live on its shores, in Quebec City and the Regional County Municipality of La Jacques-Cartier. It is the most densely populated drainage basin of any Quebec river, with an average population density of 600 inhabitants per square kilometer, mostly concentrated in the last third of its length. This makes its banks a popular place, organized around the linear park of the Saint-Charles river.

=== Drainage basin ===
Many streams of Québec City and the surroundings are tributary to Saint-Charles River.

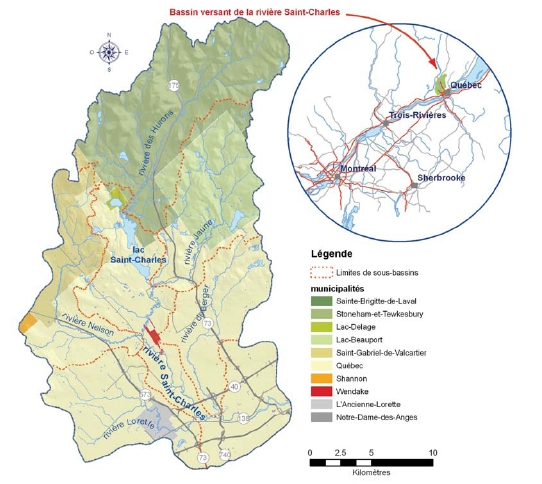
Saint-Charles River's drainage basin

The drainage basin includes six main sub-basins, that are, excluding the Saint-Charles' basin itself:

- Rivière des Hurons
- Jaune River
- Nelson River
- Rivière du Berger
- Lorette River

Saint-Charles River's drainage basin also includes many secondary streams including:

- Hibou River
- rivière des Commissaires
- rivière des Roches
- rivière des Sept-Ponts
- rivière Lairet
- ruisseau du Valet
- ruisseau Savard
- ruisseau Ste-Barbe
- ruisseau Pincourt

=== Crossing ===
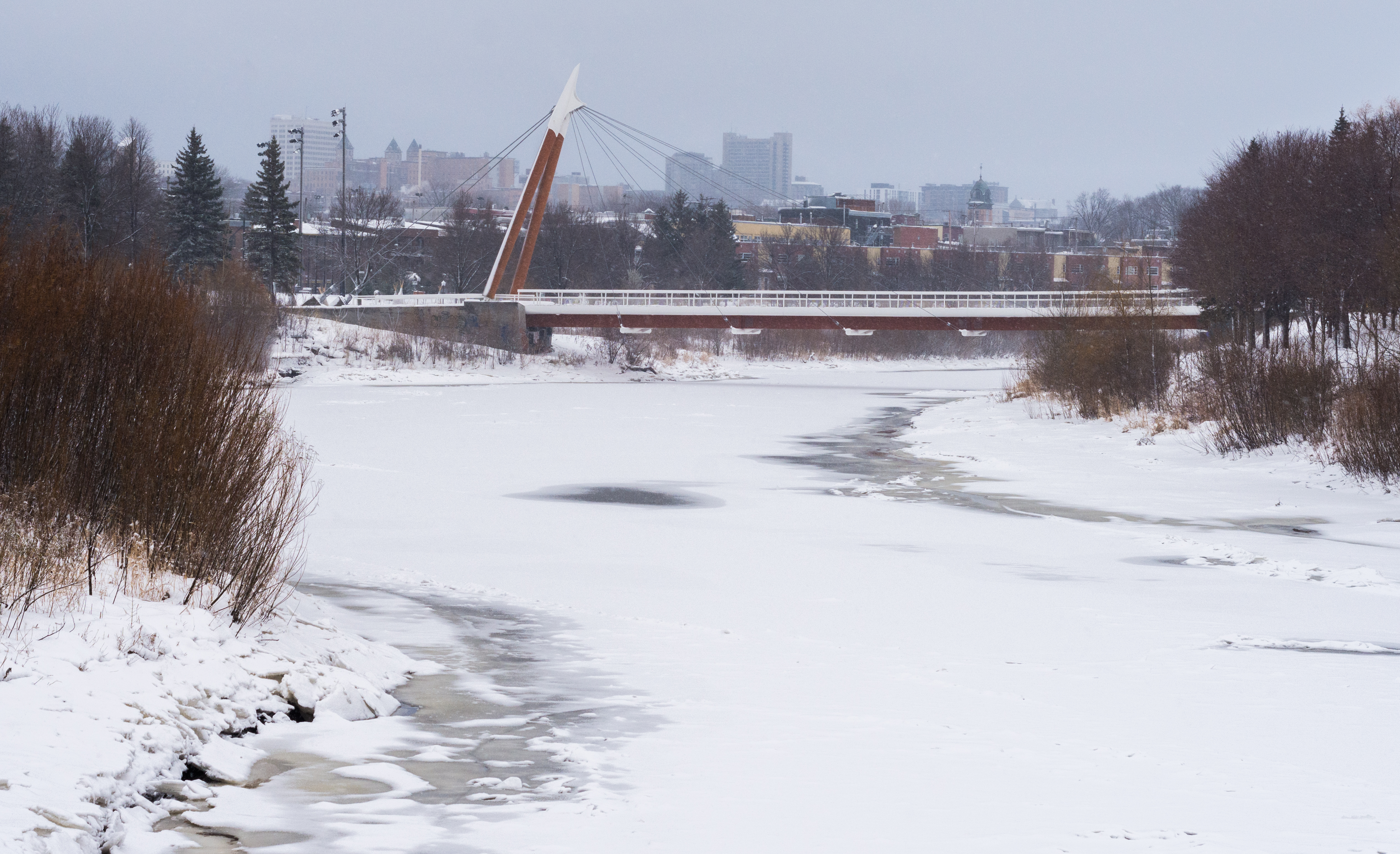
Footbridge "Des Trois-Soeurs"

The Saint-Charles river is crossed by 21 road bridges, 13 footbridges and 2 railways. In addition, there are 4 dams on its course. Among the main bridges are:

- Scott Bridge
- Marie-de-l'Incarnation Bridge
- Trois-Soeurs Footbridge (Victoria Park)
- Lavigueur Bridge
- Pont Drouin
- Dorchester Bridge
- Viaduct of Autoroute Dufferin-Montmorency

=== River course ===
From the dam at the mouth of Saint-Charles Lake, the current of the Saint-Charles river descends on 33.8 kilometres (21.0 mi), with a drop of 148 metres (486 ft), according to the following segments:

- 4.7 kilometres (2.9 mi) towards the south-east in an urban area by gathering the confluence of the Jaune River (coming from the northeast) and winding greatly to the Potato Bridge;
- 5.5 kilometres (3.4 mi) to the south, winding greatly, collecting the Eaux Fraiches stream (coming from the west), to Nelson River (coming from the southwest) in the Château-d'Eau;
- 6.5 kilometres (4.0 mi) to the south-east in an urban area, passing in particular through the Château-d'Eau and Village-des-Hurons neighborhoods, up to a bend in the river;
- 4.9 kilometres (3.0 mi) towards the south-east in an urban area by crossing the Félix-Leclerc motorway, until the confluence of the Lorette River (coming from the south);
- 4.2 kilometres (2.6 mi) towards the northeast in an urban area by forming two loops towards the north and in return, two loops towards the south, passing through the Frontenac industrial park and collecting the discharge from the Berger river (coming from the north), up to the route 740 bridge;
- 8.3 kilometres (5.2 mi) to the northeast in an urban area, forming a loop to the north, passing under the railway bridges, du boulevard Wilfrid-Hamel, avenue du Pont-Scott, rue Marie-de-l'Incarnation, Laurentian highway, rue de la Croix-Rouge, rue du Pont, Dufferin-Montmorency Highway, Jean-Lesage Boulevard and the railway, to its mouth.

== Attractions ==
=== Saint-Charles River Linear Park ===
The Parc linéaire des rivières Saint-Charles et du Berger (linear park of the Saint-Charles and Berger rivers) is a walking trail of 32 kilometres (20 mi) running along the entire length of the river. Beginning in downtown Quebec, it follows the banks of the river to the north where the scenery becomes wilder. Many walkways allow hikers to cross the river. Walkers can see there among others: the Parc of the Kabir Kouba Cliff and Waterfall, a canyon, a bog covered with a wooden sidewalk for walkers, a wooded area in the middle of the forest, a lake, a wide variety of ferns, all a diversity of plants, several species of birds and a place to observe them, a water tower, historic houses, the hotel-museum First Nations, a Wendat village and artworks.

==== Cartier-Brébeuf Park ====
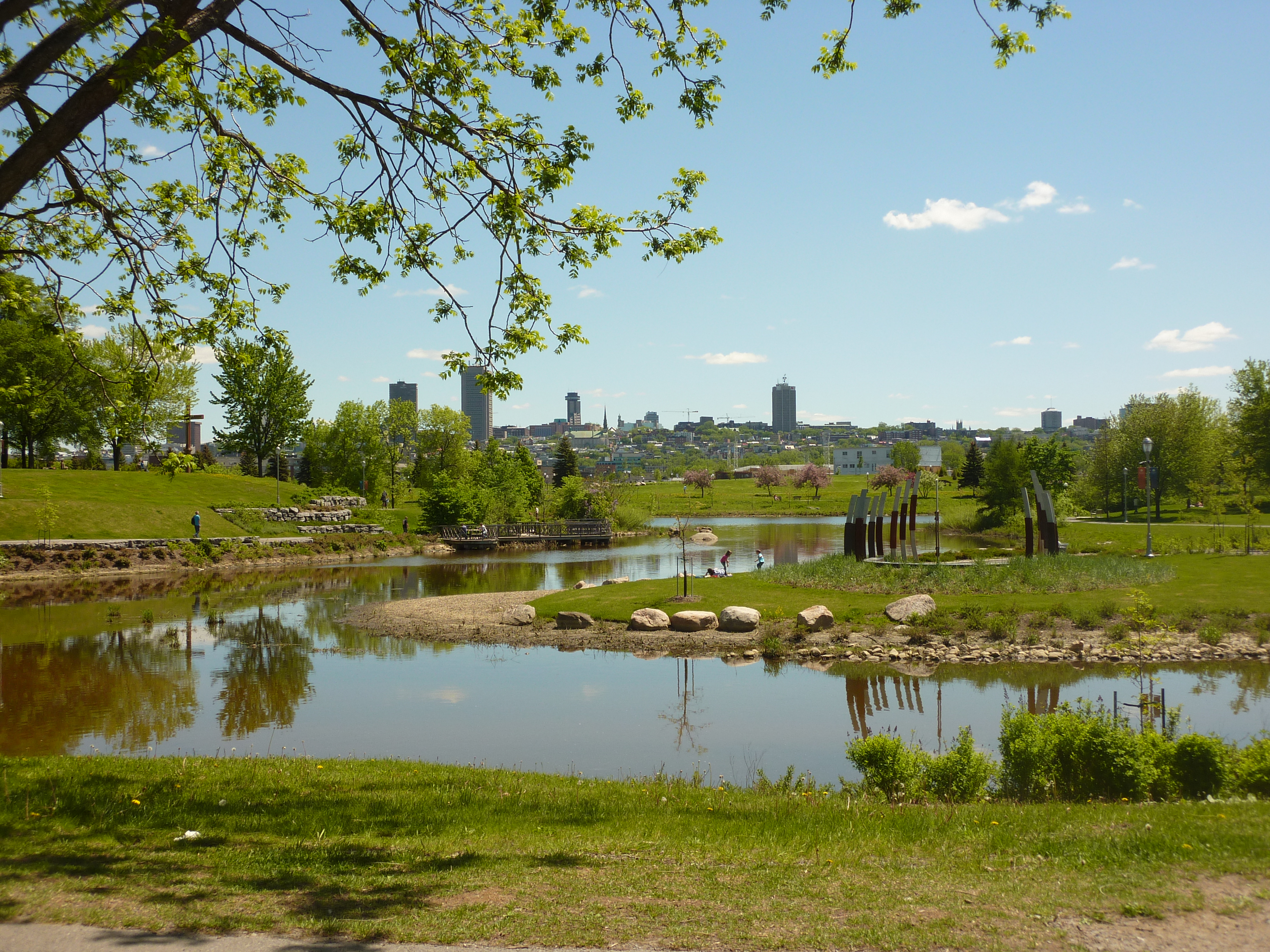
Cartier-Brébeuf National Historic Site

Finally, Cartier-Brébeuf National Historic Site, a Canadian National Historic Site, is located on the north bank of the river in the borough of Limoilou from Quebec City. This park was developed in 1972 to commemorate the passage of Jacques Cartier in 1535-1536 and the establishment of the first mission jésuite in Quebec by Jean de Brébeuf in 1625 and four others in 1625–1626. Until the 1990s, you could visit a replica of Cartier's flagship, La Grande Hermine, which was built for the 1967 World Fair in Montreal. It finally had to be destroyed since it had become dangerous due to the lack of maintenance.

Today, the uneven landscape of the park and the resurgence of the Lairet River combined with the revitalization of the Saint-Charles River banks represent the environment that have led Jacques Cartier to choose this site for his wintering. An interpretation center with a museum exposition and a 6.8 hectares inner-city park with several commemorative monuments can be found there. Nowadays, there is a site interpretation center, a reconstruction of a Longhouses of the indigenous peoples of North America such as we were to find in Stadaconé, entertainment and relaxation spaces including floral arrangements. The Saint-Charles cycleway passes in particular at this location.

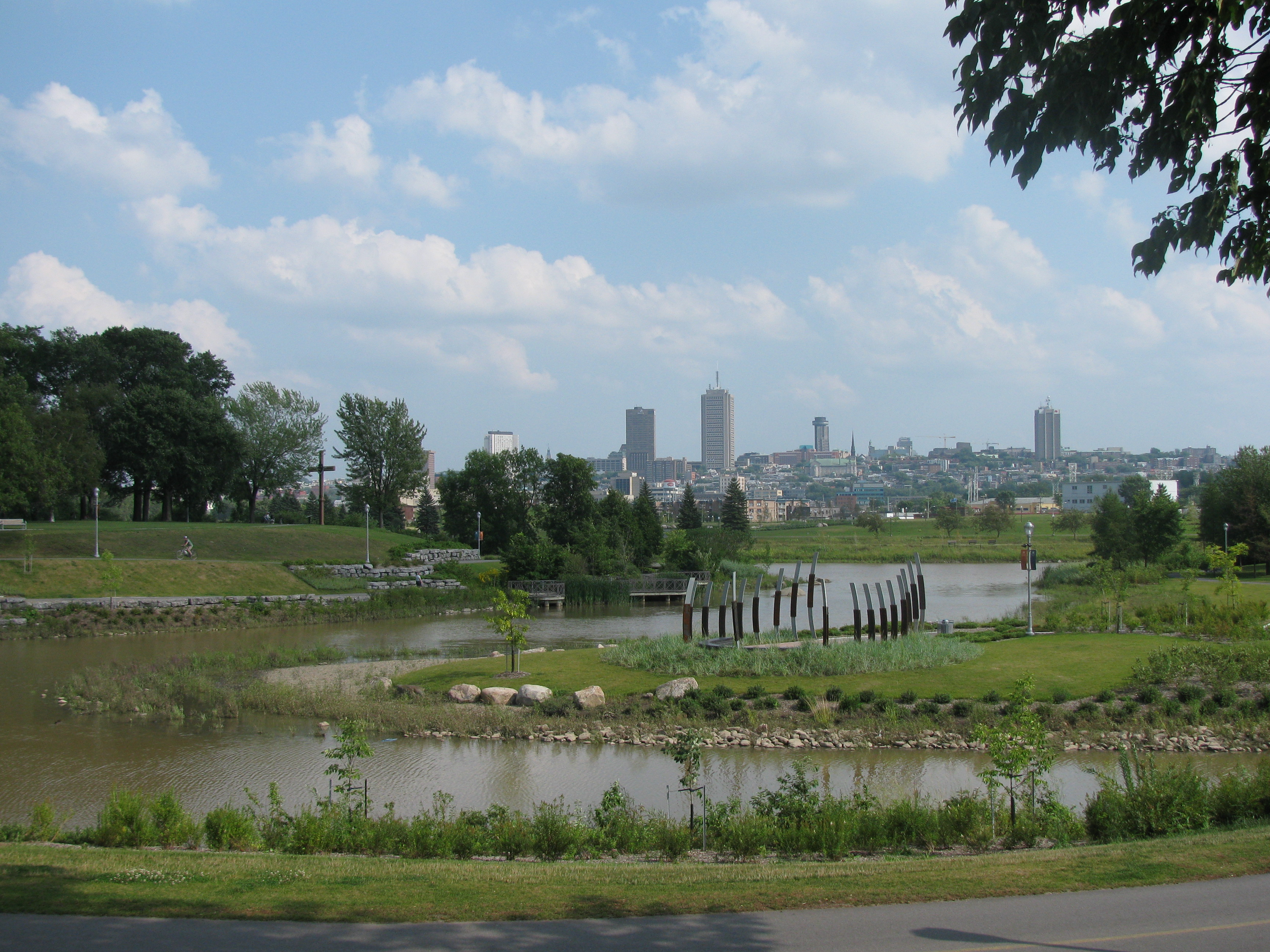
Landscape of Cartier-Brébeuf National Historic Site and the Lairet River

==== Kabir-Kouba Waterfall ====
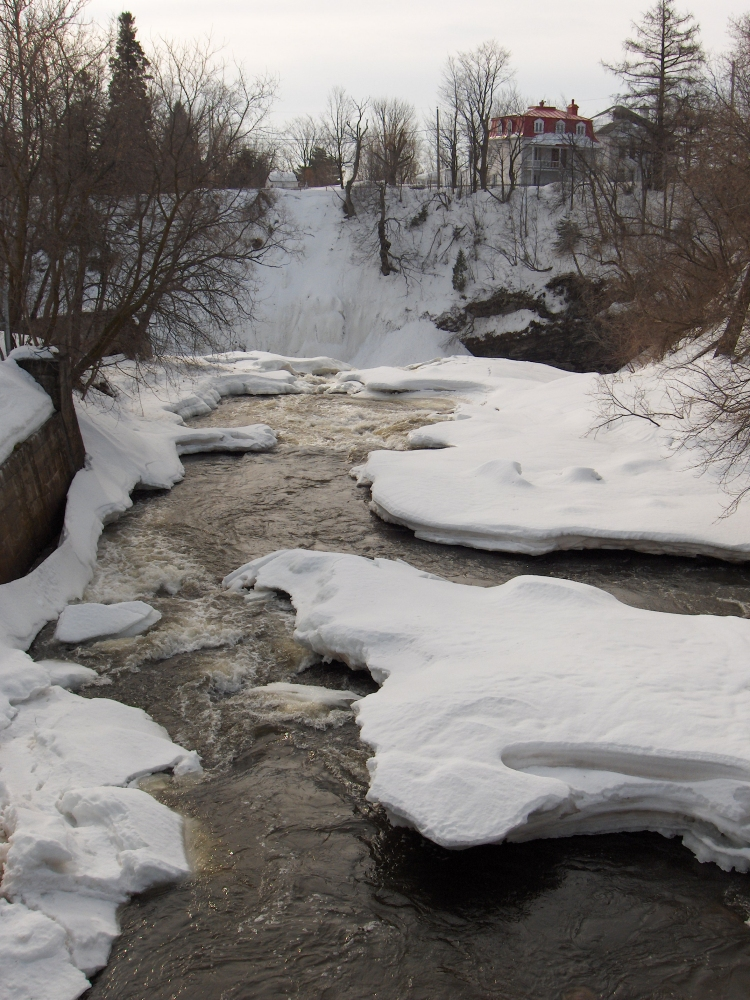
Top of the Kabir-Kouba waterfall in Wendake

This river crosses the Wendat territory of Wendake at the north of Quebec City. Rapids and waterfalls are found in this section under the name of Kabir Kouba or «Silver Serpent» in Wendat language. The Parc de la Falaise et de la chute Kabir Kouba along the falls at this place has an interpretation center and trails allowing visitors to observe the 28-metre-high (92 ft) Kabir Kouba waterfall in a 42-metre-deep (138 ft) canyon, a rich flora and fossils as old as 455 million years. A song from the singer Claire Pelletier, Kabir Kouba, refers to the many Wendat legends that revolve around the river.

==== Other parks ====
Many other parks are located along the course of Saint-Charles River. Among the main ones, is the largest park in Québec City, Chauveau Park (larger than the Plains of Abraham with its 120 ha (300 acres) against 108), and that is also the site of the Québec urban fishing Festival, that allows many fishing related activities in the river, where fish is released in preparation for the event. Les Saules Park, where people can see the gardens of the O'Neill House. In Loretteville, citizens can walk, ride and enjoy fresh air on the shores of the St-Charles River and in Jean-Roger-Durand Park.

== History ==
The estuary of Saint-Charles River in Saint-Lawrence River has a special historical significance since it is at this location that was built the Saint-Lawrence Iroquoian village of Stadacona and that Jacques Cartier spent his first winter on Canadian soil in 1535–36. The river was first named Petite Rivière or Rivière Sainte-Croix by Jacques Cartier since he came there on the day of the feast of the Cross. This name was also given to the first fort established by the French in this location. Its current name was chosen between 1615 and 1625 by the Récollets missionaries who built a mission there, in honor of their protector Charles de Boves, vicar general of the diocese of Rouen. The protection of Saint Charles Borromeo is also invoqued.

The southern part of the river's shores, near the estuary, was the site of the construction of industries during the 1960s (who used it as an open sewer) and that was girdled in concrete in the 1970s in order to regulate its flow. At this time, the river was among the most polluted (in great part due to the city's sewage system overflow) in Québec by its microbial pollution and its recreational use near the estuary was impossible. Since the mid-1990s, community and governmental efforts allowed an important renaturalisation project to take place, for over 100 million Canadian dollars.

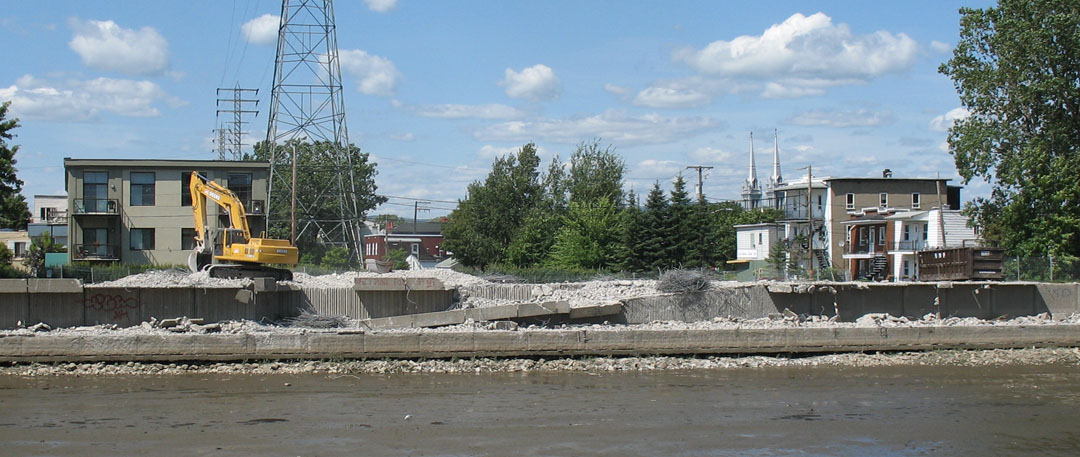
Shores renaturalisation at Limoilou (2006)

Quebec City counts in 2008 160 overflow canals allowing municipal sewage to pour into the river without treatment during periods of network congestion, specially following heavy rain. Québec's regulations allow four overflows by year, a norm that was exceeded for eleven valves along the Saint-Charles. The number of overflows was however much greater before 2002 and reached up to 50 per summer. Between 2002 and 2006, during the renaturalisation works, 14 retention reservoirs of great size were built, but investments ranging between 2 and 6 million dollars will still be required to alleviate the problem, in part blamed on old constructions where the gutters are directly connected to the city's sanitary installations.

Since 1979, the non-profit oriented organisation Fishing in town releases brook trout young into the river in order to facilitate its access to fishermen, specially young fishers. In 2008, 25 000 trouts were planted, for a sum of 700 000 since the organisation's foundation.

== Toponymy ==
This river has been known as the Petite Rivière since at least the very beginning of the 17th century. It however took the name of Saint-Charles River between 1615 and 1625. In a letter of February 27, 1621, Charles de Boves or Desboues notes that the foundation of the Récollets convent was designated under the name of Saint-Charles and is delighted to see this foundation put at the same time under the protection of the great reformer Saint Charles Borromée. Father Charles Lalemant wrote in 1626: “the river on which they (Les Récollets) and we are lodged is called the S. Charles river, so named some time before that we came. The Récollets convent, built near the Petite Rivière, whose church was finished and blessed on May 25, 1621, was given the name of Saint-Charles and the same name was assigned to the watercourse. The historian Chrestien Le Clercq specifies in 1691 that: "The little river was called Cabir Coubat by the Savages, because of the turns & returns it makes by snaking, & the points of land it forms: our Fathers gave it the name of Saint Charles, which she still keeps today in memory & in honor of Monsignor Charles des Bouës, or Des Boves, Grand Vicar of Pontoise, Father and Founder of our Mission. ” As early as 1636, Recollet Sagard had indicated that: "a small river that we call from S. Charles, & the Montagnais Cabirecoubat, because it turns and makes several points." According to Le Foyer canadienne, the Wendat (Hurons) called this river Oriaouenrak, trout river. On September 14, 1535, Jacques Cartier had baptized this watercourse "ripvière saincte Croix" because it arrived at "saincte Croix" - today Quebec - the day of the Exaltation of the Holy Cross. This river is indicated Rivière Saint-Charles on the maps of Champlain (1632) and Bourdon (around 1641), the latter also recording Lac Saint-Charles for the water table at the source of the river.

The toponym "Saint-Charles River" was formalized on December 5, 1968 at the Commission de toponymie du Québec.

=== Park of the cliff and the Kabir Kouba waterfall ===
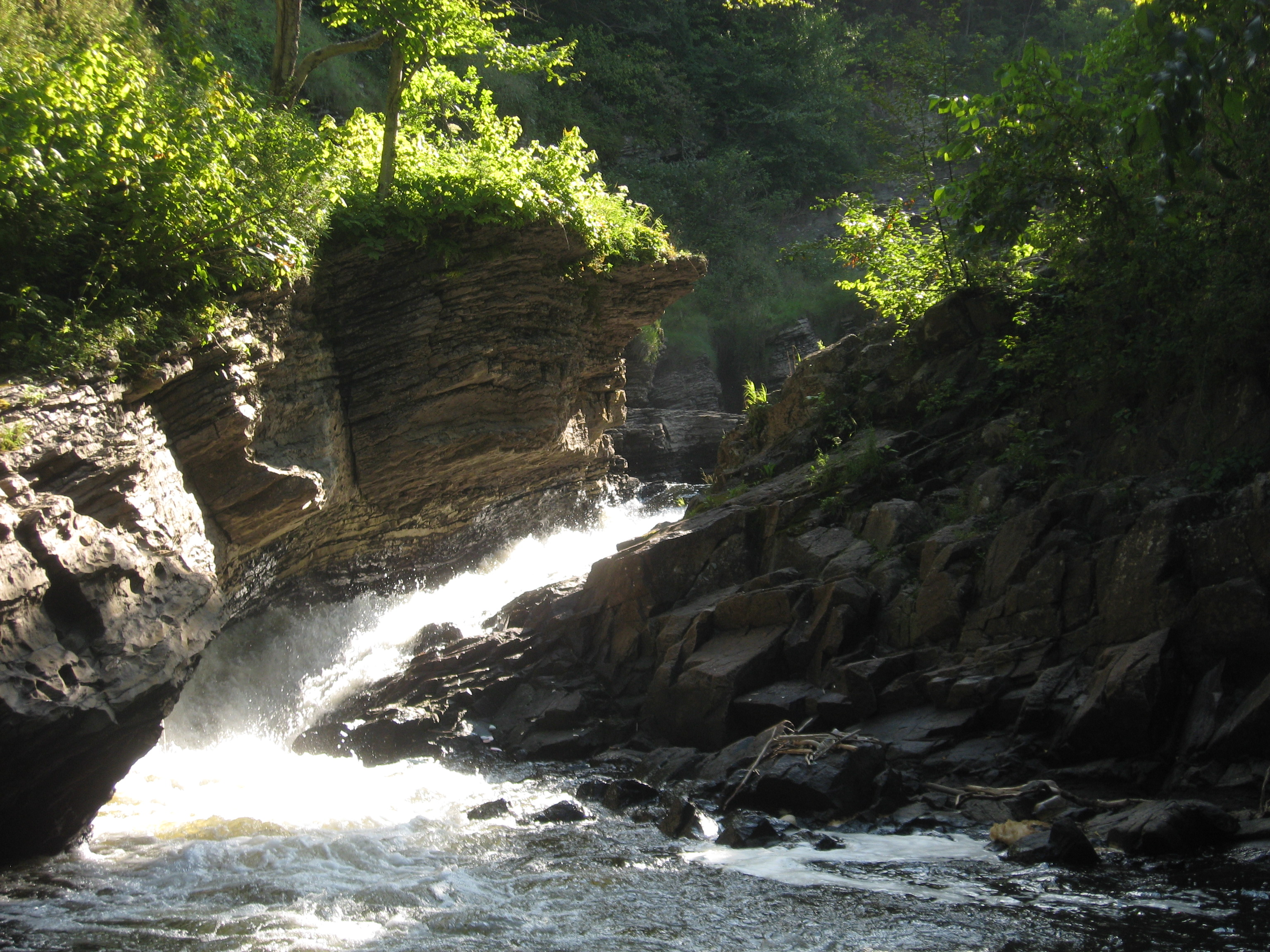
The Saint-Charles river near Wendake.

The river crosses the Wendat territory of Wendake, landlocked in Quebec City. Rapids and waterfalls are present in this section under the name of Kabir Kouba or "the river of a thousand detours" in Wendat. The Parc of the Kabir Kouba Cliff and Waterfall along the waterfalls at this location has an interpretation pavilion and trails allowing you to observe, among other things, the 28-meter Kabir Kouba waterfall in a canyon of 42 meters high, a rich flora and fossils dating back over 455 million years.

=== Other parks ===
The circuit crosses several parks located along the Saint-Charles River. Among the most important, there is the largest park in Quebec, Parc Chauveau (larger than the Parc des Plains of Abraham with its 120 hectares against 108), which is also the Quebec City Fishing Festival site, which allows several activities related to fishing in the river, stocked for the occasion. Les Saules Park where people can admire the gardens of the O'Neill house. In Loretteville, citizens can walk, pedal and enjoy the outdoors on the banks of the Saint-Charles River in Jean-Roger-Durand Park.

== Tributes ==
- The Saint-Charles river, with its old banks, was represented on a dollar coin, in 1992, Dollars du Carnaval de Québec. These symbolic coins were sold to merchants in Old Quebec during the Carnival and their value ended at the end of the carnival edition of the year of striking the coin
- A play by the singer Claire Pelletier, Kabir Kouba, evokes the Wendat legends which are many to put the river in the spotlight.

== Gallery ==
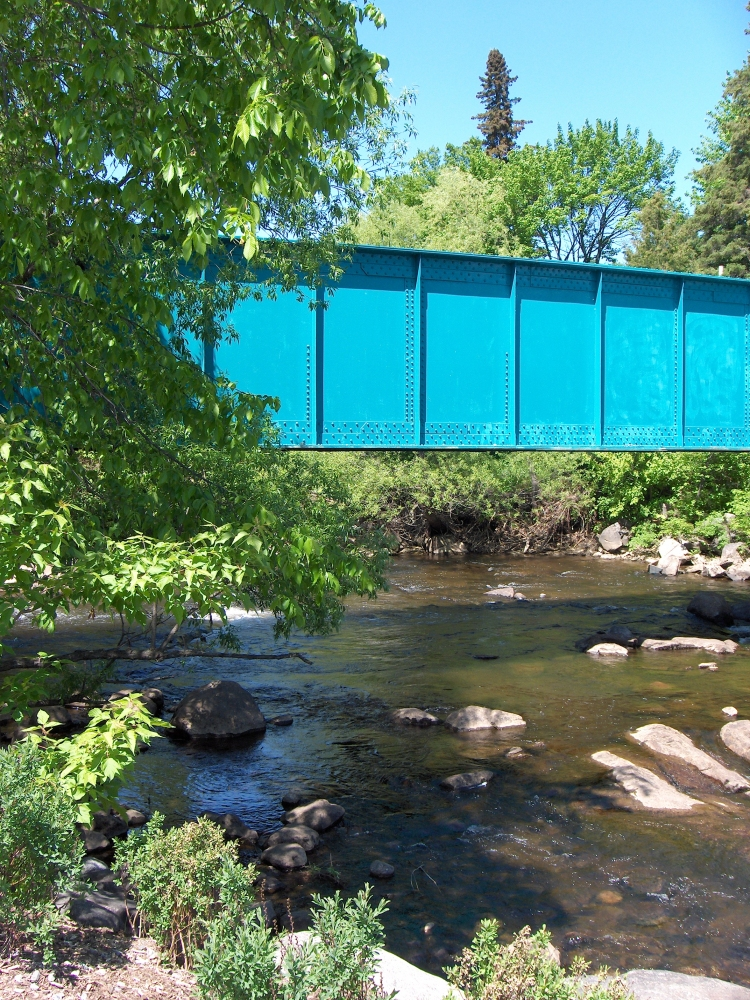
Cycleway bridge over the Saint-Charles River (Loretteville, Quebec)

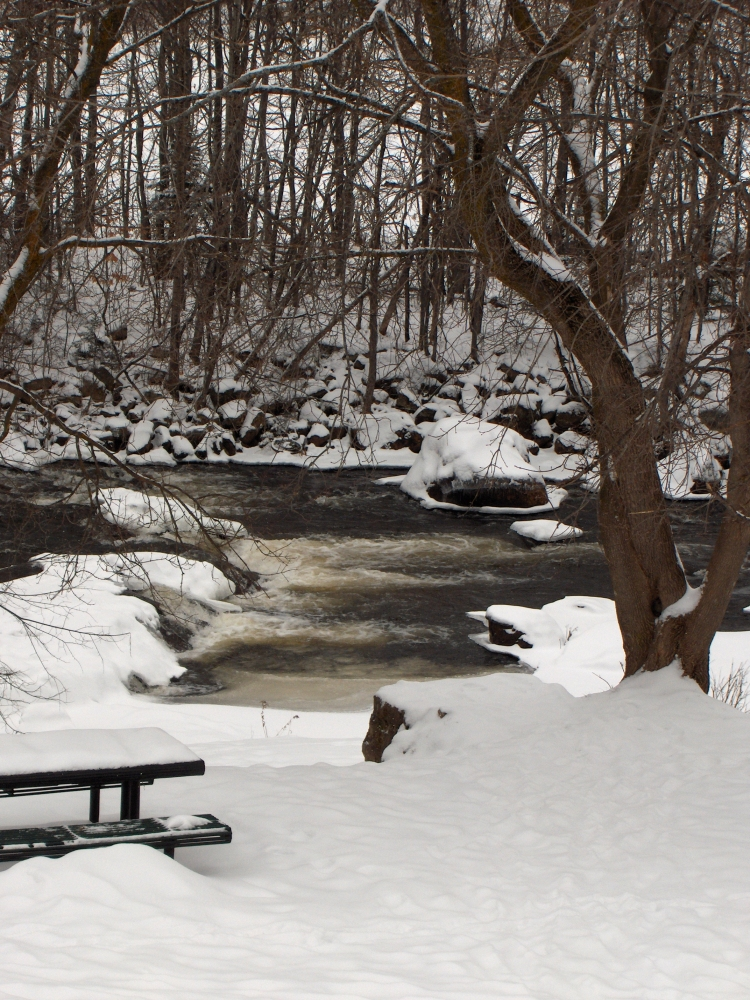
Jean-Roger-Durand Park and Saint-Charles River (Loretteville, Quebec)

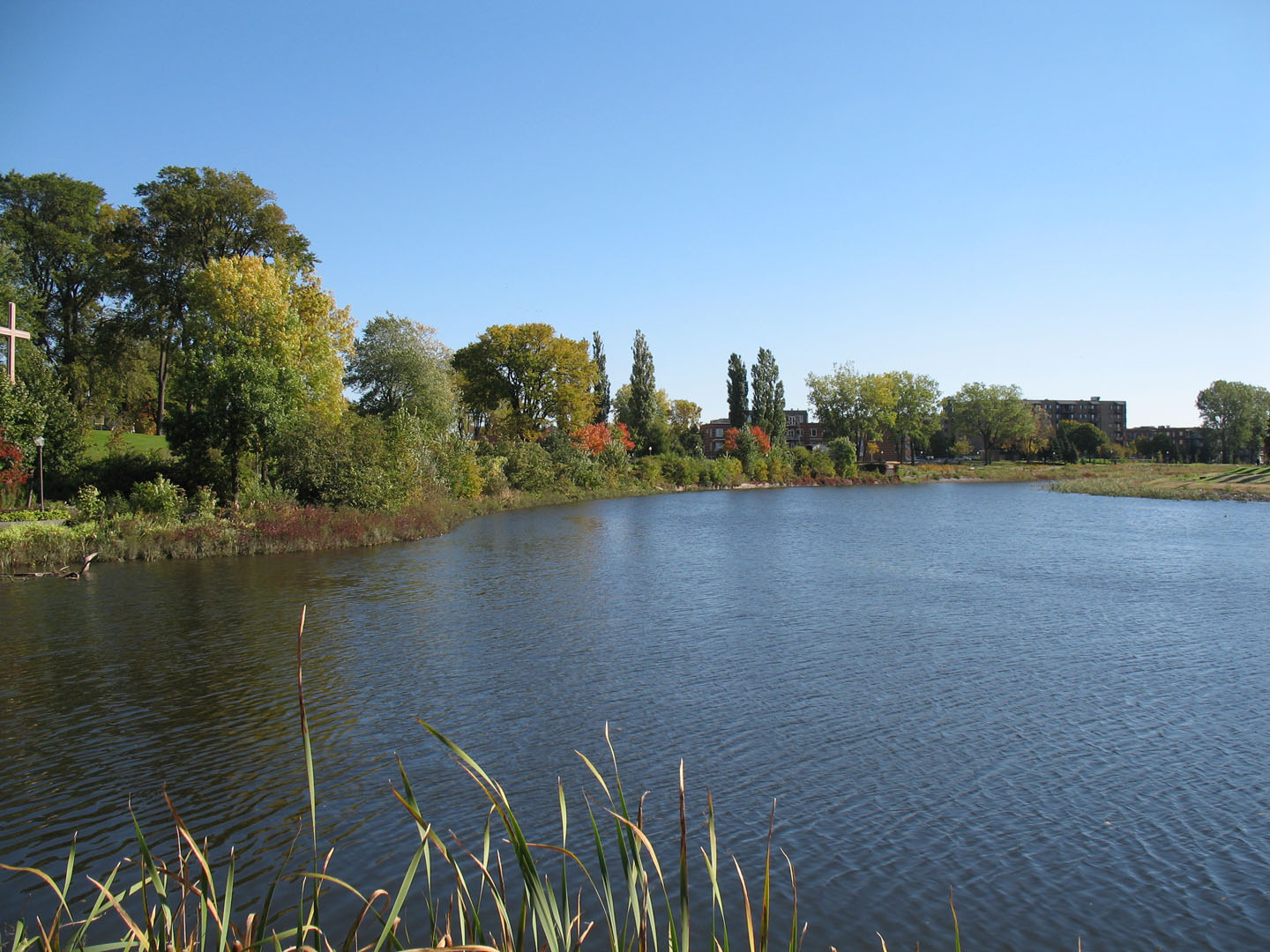
Saint-Charles River

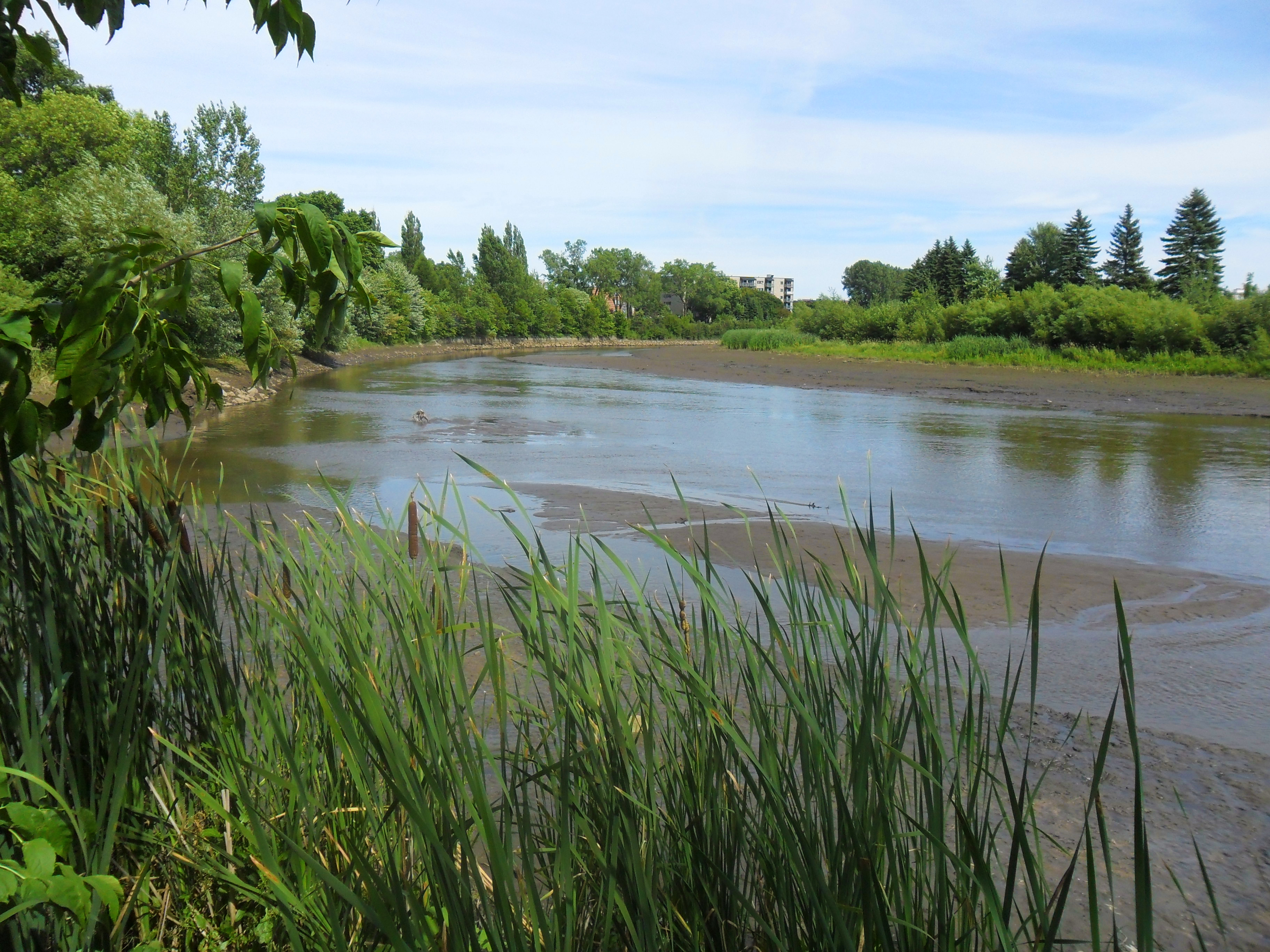
The Saint-Charles River (low water)

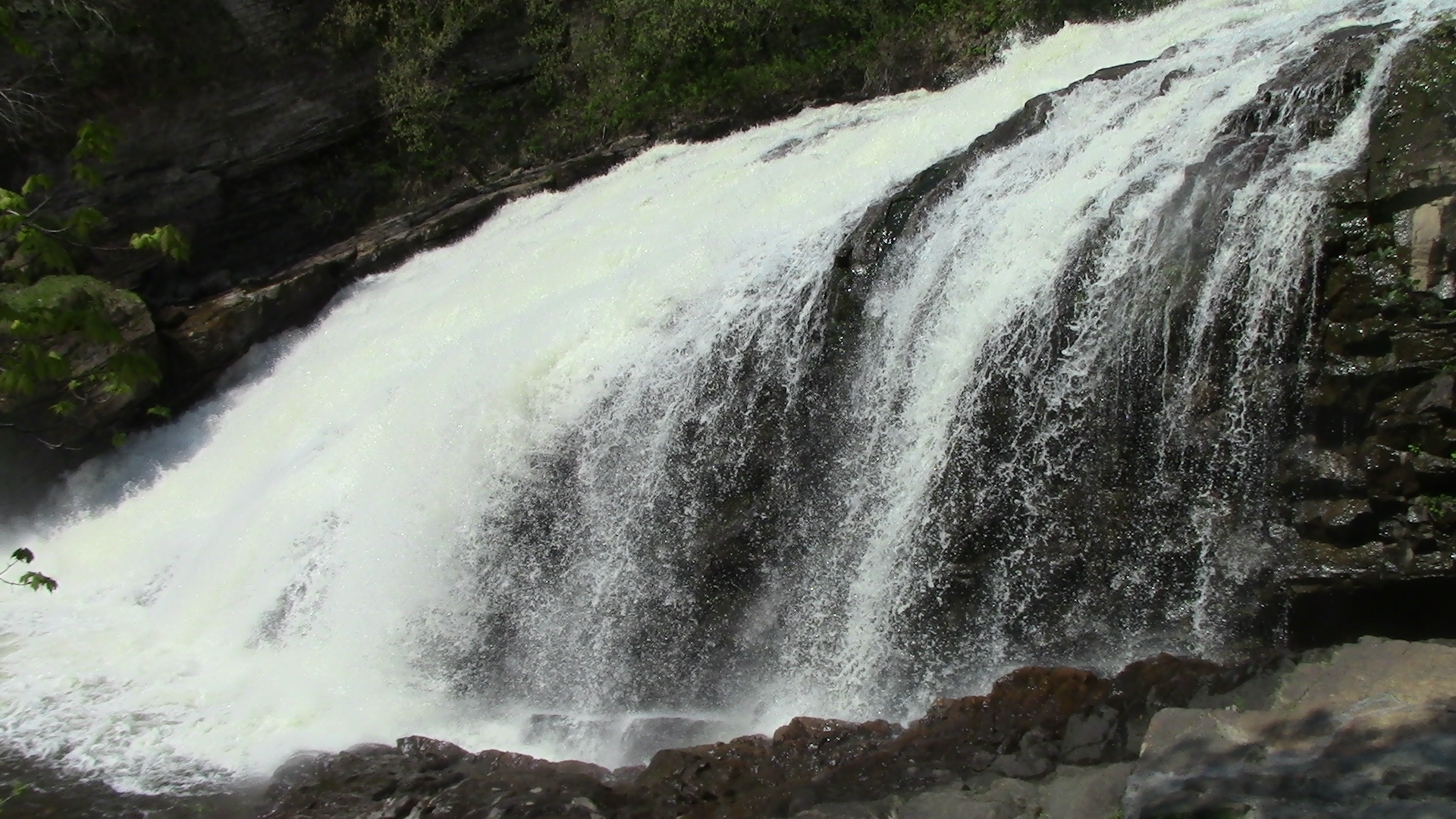
The Kabir-Kouba waterfall

== See also ==
- Quebec City
- Lorette River
- Nelson River
- Jaune River
- Saint-Charles Lake
- List of rivers of Quebec

== External links and sources ==
- Vescovi, Luc, Réflexion moderne sur la gestion de l'eau en milieu urbain : modélisation hydro-bio-chimique du bassin dela rivière Saint-Charles, 1999, Thèse présentée pour l'obtention du grade de docteur en Science de l'eau. Université du Québec. INRS-Eau. Québec, Canada. Originellement consulté en ligne le 15 juin 2006.
- L'organisme "Rivière vivante" qui oeuvre à la renaturalisation de la Saint-Charles, consulté le 15 juin 2006.
- Conseil de bassin de la rivière Saint-Charles, consulté le 15 juin 2006.
- Dossier du webzine "Franc Vert", consulté le 15 juin 2006.
- La rivière Saint-Charles près du parc Cartier-Brébeuf sur Google Maps
- Brodeur, C., F. Lewis, E. Huet-Alegre, Y. Ksouri, M.-C. Leclerc et D. Viens. 2007. Portrait du bassin de la rivière Saint-Charles. Conseil de bassin de la rivière Saint-Charles. 216 p + 9 annexes 217-340 pp
