= List of museums in Quebec =

This list of museums in Quebec, Canada contains museums which are defined for this context as institutions (including nonprofit organizations, government entities, and private businesses) that collect and care for objects of cultural, artistic, scientific, or historical interest and make their collections or related exhibits available for public viewing. Also included are non-profit art galleries and university art galleries. Museums that exist only in cyberspace (i.e., virtual museums) are not included.

- See also List of museums in Montreal for museums in the Montreal region.
- See also List of museums in Quebec City for museums in Quebec City.

== Museums ==
Name	Town/City	Region	Type	Summary
Abitibiwinni	Pikogan	Abitibi-Témiscamingue	First Nations	website, history and culture of the Abitibiwinni First Nation
A.C. Davie Shipyard National Historic Site	Lévis	Chaudière-Appalaches	Maritime	website, includes shipyard exhibits, homestead house, stable and marine railway, history of Davie Shipbuilding
Albert Gilles Museum	Château-Richer	Capitale-Nationale	Art	website, boutique, workshop and museum of copper art by Albert Gilles
Argenteuil Regional Museum	Saint-André-d'Argenteuil	Laurentides	History	website, local history, located in the Carillon Barracks
Art-image et espace Odyssée	Gatineau	Outaouais	Art	website, contemporary art at the Maison de la culture de Gatineau
ASTER, la Station scientifique du Bas-Saint-Laurent	Saint-Louis-du-Ha! Ha!	Bas-Saint-Laurent	Science	website, public observatory with an interpretation centre about astronomy
ASTROLab du parc national du Mont-Mégantic	Notre-Dame-des-Bois	Estrie	Science	Astronomy, geology, biology and ecology
Banc de Pêche de Paspébiac	Paspébiac	Gaspésie–Îles-de-la-Madeleine	Industry	Features 11 fishing industry buildings to demonstrate occupations, history and impact of the industry
Battle of Restigouche National Historic Site	Pointe-à-la-Croix	Gaspésie–Îles-de-la-Madeleine	Military	History and artifacts from the site of a 1760 naval battle
Battle of the Châteauguay National Historic Site	Howick	Montérégie	Military	website, exhibits and site of the 1812 Battle of the Châteauguay
Bay Chaleur Military Museum	New Richmond	Gaspésie–Îles-de-la-Madeleine	Military	website, contributions of Gaspesians in the major conflicts of the 20th century, impact on the community
Beluga Interpretation Centre	Sacré-Cœur	Côte-Nord	Natural history	Located at the Baie-Sainte-Marguerite sector of Saguenay National Park, summer feeding area for beluga whales
Biophare	Sorel-Tracy	Montérégie	Natural history	website, ecosystem and wildlife of the Lac Saint-Pierre Biosphere Reserve
Blockhaus de la rivière-Lacolle	Saint-Paul-de-l'Île-aux-Noix	Montérégie	Military	Restored 1871 military blockhouse
Boréalis	Trois-Rivières	Mauricie	Industry	website, opened in 2010, formerly the Pulp and Paper Industry Exhibition Center, exhibits on the pulp and paper industry
Brome County Museum	Brome Lake	Montérégie	Multiple	website, includes main museum with period home and business displays, courthouse, military display, local history and antiques, schoolhouse, operated by the Brome County Historical Society
Canadian Children's Museum	Gatineau	Outaouais	Children's	Located inside the Canadian Museum of History
Canadian Museum of History	Gatineau	Outaouais	Multiple	Canada's history, culture and heritage, including First Nations
Canadian Postal Museum	Gatineau	Outaouais	Philatelic	Located inside the Canadian Museum of History, Canada's postal heritage and stamps
Canadian Railway Museum	Delson	Montérégie	Railway	Also known as Exporail, railway equipment and heritage railroad
Cap de Bon-Désir Interpretation and Observation Centre	Les Bergeronnes	Côte-Nord	Natural history	website, marine life of the Saint Lawrence River estuary, navigation along the river, part of the Saguenay-St. Lawrence Marine Park
Cap-des-Rosiers Lighthouse	Gaspé	Gaspésie–Îles-de-la-Madeleine	Maritime	Tours of the lighthouse in the summer
Carillon Canal National Historic Site	Saint-André-d'Argenteuil	Laurentides	Transportation	Exhibits about the canal at the toll collector's house
Carrefour culturel Paul-Médéric	Baie-Saint-Paul	Capitale-Nationale	Art	website, visual and cultural arts center with gallery
Cascapedia River Museum	Cascapédia–Saint-Jules	Gaspésie–Îles-de-la-Madeleine	Sports	website, salmon fly fishing
Centrale de la Rivière-des-Prairies	Laval	Laval	Science	website, operated by Hydro-Québec, water-powered electricity and the building of the Rivière des Prairies generating station
Centre Archéo Topo	Les Bergeronnes	Côte-Nord	Archaeology	website, prehistoric archaeology of the Upper North Shore region
Centre culturel Le Griffon	Gaspé	Gaspésie–Îles-de-la-Madeleine	Industry	website, exhibits about the local fishermen's co-operative
Centre culturel Marie-Fitzbach	Saint-Georges	Chaudière-Appalaches	Multiple	website, cultural center with art gallery, local history exhibits, exhibit on area industrialists
Centre culturel Yvonne L. Bombardier	Valcourt	Estrie	Art	website, cultural center with visual art and literary exhibitions and events, operated by La Fondation J. Armand Bombardier
Centre d'art de Kamouraska	Kamouraska	Bas-Saint-Laurent	Art	website, art exhibits
Centre d’art Diane-Dufresne	Repentigny	Lanaudière	Art	website
Centre d'art Rotary	La Sarre	Abitibi-Témiscamingue	Art	information, art centre with gallery
Centre d'exposition l'Imagier	Gatineau	Outaouais	Art	website, contemporary art gallery and sculpture park
Centre d’exposition de Rouyn-Noranda	Rouyn-Noranda	Abitibi-Témiscamingue	Art	website, art centre
Centre d’exposition de Val-David	Val-David	Laurentides	Art	website
Centre d’exposition Leo-Ayotte	Shawinigan	Mauricie	Art	website, part of Culture Shawinigan
Centre d’exposition Raymond-Lasnier	Trois-Rivières	Mauricie	Art	website, art centre
Centre d'histoire et d'archéologie de la Métabetchouane	Desbiens	Saguenay–Lac-Saint-Jean	Multiple	information, reconstructed fur trading post, local history exhibits, art, natural history, archaeological site and artifacts
Centre d'histoire Sir-William-Price (Sir William Price Heritage Center)	Jonquière	Saguenay–Lac-Saint-Jean	Multiple	website, history of the Price family, local logging, lumber and paper industries
Centre d'interprétation de l'agriculture et de la ruralité	Métabetchouan–Lac-à-la-Croix	Saguenay–Lac-Saint-Jean	Agriculture	website
Centre d'interprétation de l'ardoise	Richmond	Estrie	Industry	website, economuseum about area slateworking
Centre d'interprétation de l'eau	Laval	Laval	Science	website, also known as C.I.EAU, water purification and importance of clean water
Centre d'interprétation de l'histoire de Port-Cartier	Port-Cartier	Côte-Nord	History	information, local history
Centre d'Interprétation de la Côte-de-Beaupré	Château-Richer	Capitale-Nationale	Multiple	Local history and art exhibits
Centre d'interprétation de la forestrie	La Sarre	Abitibi-Témiscamingue	Forestry	information, 1930s lumberjack's life and logging camp
Centre d'interprétation de la guêpe	Laverlochère-Angliers	Abitibi-Témiscamingue	Natural history	website, collection of wasp nests and how they are built
Centre d'interprétation de la traite des fourrures (Fur Trade Interpretation Centre and Tour)	La Tuque	Mauricie	History	website, fur trading post and industry
Centre d'interprétation de tracteurs antiques	Saint-Romain	Estrie	Agriculture	information, historic tractors
Centre d'interprétation des energies renouvelables	Richelieu	Montérégie	Science	website, renewable energy and sustainable living practices
Centre d’interprétation du cuivre de Murchochville	Murdochville	Gaspésie–Îles-de-la-Madeleine	Mining	website, copper mining
Centre d'interprétation du Patrimoine de Notre-Dame-des-Monts	Notre-Dame-des-Monts	Capitale-Nationale	Multiple	information, local history, natural history and culture, cheese-making
Centre d'interprétation du patrimoine de Plaisance	Plaisance	Outaouais	History	website, local history
Centre d'Interprétation du site archéologique Droulers/Tsiionhiakwatha	Saint-Anicet	Montérégie	First Nations	website, reconstructed St. Lawrence Iroquois village and archaeological site
Centre d'interprétation Les Acadiens à Saint-Grégoire	Bécancour	Centre-du-Québec	History	website, lives of the builders of the windmill, operated by the Société acadienne Port-Royal
Centre de la Biodiversité du Québec	Bécancour	Centre-du-Québec	Natural history	website, live animals, habitats displays, Quebec's biological species, sustainable living
Centre des migrations	Montmagny	Chaudière-Appalaches	Natural history	information, Canada snow geese migration
Centre et circuit Félix-Leclerc	La Tuque	Mauricie	Biographical	information, life of singer-songwriter Félix Leclerc, area history and culture
Centre historique des Sœurs du Bon Conseil	Chicoutimi	Saguenay–Lac-Saint-Jean	Religious	website, artifacts and history of the Sœurs du Bon Conseil convent
Centre National d’exposition CNE	Jonquière	Saguenay–Lac-Saint-Jean	Art	website, contemporary art exhibits, also science and history
Chantier de Gédéon	Laverlochère-Angliers	Abitibi-Témiscamingue	Forestry	website, reconstructed 1930s logging camp
Château Logue	Maniwaki	Outaouais	Forestry	website, forests, forest fire prevention, and forestry industry; also changing exhibits of art
Chutes Coulonge	Fort-Coulonge	Outaouais	Forestry	Open air exhibits and visitor center in park
Christmas Chateau	Rivière-du-Loup	Bas-Saint-Laurent	Commodity	website, Christmas displays of all types
CIBRO; Centre d’interprétation des battures et de réhabilitation des oiseaux	Saint-Fulgence	Saguenay–Lac-Saint-Jean	Natural history	website, bird rehabilitation center and interpretive center about migratory birds and the local flats
CIMM Centre d'interprétation des mammifères marins	Tadoussac	Côte-Nord	Natural history	website, whales and other marine mammals
Cité de l'Énergie	Shawinigan	Mauricie	Science	Electricity, pulp and paper, aluminum and electrochemistry
Cité de l'Or	Val-d'Or	Abitibi-Témiscamingue	Mining	Gold mining tour and 1930s mining company house
Colby-Curtis Museum	Stanstead	Estrie	History	website, rooms with collections of decorative furnishings representing several generations of a prominent border family of American origin, as well as changing exhibits of local history; operated by the Stanstead Historical Society
Cosmodome (Laval)	Laval	Laval	Science	Space and science
Coteau-du-Lac National Historic Site	Coteau-du-Lac	Montérégie	Multiple	River transportation by portage and then canal, military blockhouse
Daniel Weetaluktuk Memorial Museum and Cultural Transmission Centre	Inukjuak	Nord-du-Québec	First Nations	information, culture and language of the Nunavik Inuit
Domaine Joly-De Lotbinière	Sainte-Croix	Chaudière-Appalaches	Multiple	website, historic estate with gardens and trails, art exhibits, 1920s furnished rooms
Domaine seigneurial Sainte-Anne	Sainte-Anne-de-la-Pérade	Mauricie	Historic house	website, displays three centuries of history in an estate manor house
Eaton Corner Museum	Cookshire-Eaton	Estrie	History	website, local history
École de Rang Campbell	Sainte-Sabine	Montérégie	Education	website, one room schoolhouse
École de Rang II d'Authier	Authier	Abitibi-Témiscamingue	Education	information, historic schoolhouse
Économusée de la brasserie	Saint-Alexis-des-Monts	Mauricie	Food	website, economuseum of beer making and the microbrewery Les bières de la Nouvelle-France
Église-Musée Saint-Venant-de-Paquette	Saint-Venant-de-Paquette	Estrie	Religious	website, history of the church, its architecture and artifacts
Église Notre-Dame-de-la-Présentation	Shawinigan	Mauricie	Religious	website, tours of church with panels painted by Ozias Leduc
Église orthodoxe russe S^{t}-Georges de Rouyn-Noranda	Rouyn-Noranda	Abitibi-Témiscamingue	History	website, historic Russian Orthodox church with exhibits about area Eastern European immigrants and their contributions
Électrium	Sainte-Julie	Montérégie	Science	website, electricity, operated by Hydro-Quebec
Épopée de Capelton	North Hatley	Estrie	Mining	website, underground copper mine
Espace Félix-Leclerc	Île d'Orléans	Capitale-Nationale	Biographical	website, work of singer and poet Félix Leclerc
Espace Pierre-Debain	Gatineau	Outaouais	Art	information, contemporary craft and visual art
Érablière du Lac-Beauport	Lac-Beauport	Capitale-Nationale	Multiple	website, economuseum of maple syrup, with maple and wildlife displays
Exploramer	Sainte-Anne-des-Monts	Gaspésie–Îles-de-la-Madeleine	Natural history	website, aquarium, marine life and marine science exhibits
EXPRESSION, Centre d'exposition de Saint-Hyacinthe	Saint-Hyacinthe	Montérégie	Art	website, contemporary art gallery
Forges du Saint-Maurice	Trois-Rivières	Mauricie	Industry	Iron forge and its industrial community
Forillon National Park	Gaspé	Gaspésie–Îles-de-la-Madeleine	Multiple	Visitor center exhibits about the park's natural history and human history, Hyman & Sons General Store and warehouse with exhibits about the cod fishing industry, and Anse Blanchette, a fisherman's homestead with costumed interpreters
Fort Chambly National Historic Site	Delson	Montérégie	Military	Historic French then British fort, exhibits on New France
Fort Lennox National Historic Site	Île aux Noix	Montérégie	Military	Reconstructed 1820s fort
Fort Ingall	Cabano	Bas-Saint-Laurent	Military	Reconstructed 19th-century fort
Fort Témiscamingue National Historic Site	Duhamel-Ouest	Abitibi-Témiscamingue	History	Remains of 17th-century trading post, visitor center exhibits and re-enactments about New France and the Algonquin
Fossilarium	Notre-Dame-du-Nord	Abitibi-Témiscamingue	Natural history	website, sea fossils from the Ordovician-Silurian period, formerly the Lake Timiskaming Fossil Center
Maison Frère-Moffete	Ville-Marie, Quebec	Témiscamingue Regional County Municipality	Historic	Adapted house to hold a museum.
Galerie d'art du Centre culturel	Sherbrooke	Estrie	Art	website, part of the Université de Sherbrooke, contemporary art gallery in the cultural centre
Galerie d'art du Parc	Trois-Rivières	Mauricie	Art	website, located in the Manoir de Tonnancour
Galerie Montcalm	Gatineau	Outaouais	Art	website, contemporary art gallery
Galerie Renée-Blain	Brossard	Montérégie	Art	website, art gallery
Garage de la culture	Saint-Élie-de-Caxton	Mauricie	History	information, local history
Gaspesian British Heritage Village	New Richmond	Gaspésie–Îles-de-la-Madeleine	Living	website, village with many buildings portraying British settlers from the 1760s to the early 1900s
Gespeg Micmac Interpretation Site	Fontenelle	Gaspésie–Îles-de-la-Madeleine	First Nations	website, Micmac heritage and culture
Granite Expo & Museum of Stanstead	Stanstead	Estrie	Industry	website, economuseum of granite industry and works, model train collection
Heritage Kinnear's Mills	Kinnear's Mills	Chaudière-Appalaches	History	website, local history
Horse-drawn Carriage Museum	Colombourg	Abitibi-Témiscamingue	Transportation	information, collection of Claude-Morin
Irish Memorial National Historic Site	Grosse Isle	Chaudière-Appalaches	Ethnic	Site of an immigration depot which predominantly housed Irish immigrants coming to Canada to escape the Great Irish Famine, 1845–1849
Kempffer Cultural Interpretation Centre	New Carlisle	Gaspésie–Îles-de-la-Madeleine	History	information, local history
Kempt Road Interpretation Centre	Matapédia	Gaspésie–Îles-de-la-Madeleine	History	website, local history
La Corne Nursing Station	La Corne	Abitibi-Témiscamingue	Medical	website, outpost settlement nursing station
Lévis Forts National Historic Site	Lévis	Chaudière-Appalaches	Military	Mid-19th-century British fort with exhibits
Louis S. St. Laurent National Historic Site	Compton	Estrie	Historic house	website, early 20th-century period childhood home of Louis Saint-Laurent, prime minister of Canada, and his father's general store
Mackenzie King Estate	Chelsea	Outaouais	Historic house	website, 20th-century estate of Prime Minister William Lyon Mackenzie King, includes restored 19th-century cottages with period guides, exhibits on his life, gardens and trails
Magasin général historique authentique 1928	Percé	Gaspésie–Îles-de-la-Madeleine	History	website, 1928 period general store with merchandise
Magasin général Le Brun	Maskinongé	Mauricie	History	information, three general stores dating back to different epochs: 1803, 1827 and 1915
Maison Alphonse-Desjardins	Lévis	Chaudière-Appalaches	Historic house	website, late Victorian period home of banker Alphonse Desjardins, history of the first cooperative group in North America
Maison amérindienne	Mont-Saint-Hilaire	Montérégie	First Nations	website, culture and contemporary art
Maison Antoine-Lacombe	Saint-Charles-Borromée	Lanaudière	Art	website, 1847 house with art exhibits and a sculpture garden
Maison Bélisle	Terrebonne	Lanaudière	Multiple	website, art and history exhibits
Maison Bourgoin	Price	Gaspésie–Îles-de-la-Madeleine	History	information, local history, culture and art
Maison Chapais	Saint-Denis-de-la-Bouteillerie	Bas-Saint-Laurent	Historic house	website, 19th-century Victorian period house
Maison d'école du rang Cinq Chicots	Saint-Christophe-d'Arthabaska	Centre-du-Québec	Education	website, one room schoolhouse with changing exhibits of art and culture
Maison de la culture de Dudswell	Dudswell	Estrie	Art	information, art centre with exhibits, features 68 wooden sculptures of early 20th-century rural life by Louis-Émile Beauregard
Maison de la culture Roland-Jomphe	Havre-Saint-Pierre	Côte-Nord	History	website, local history
Maison de la culture et du patrimoine	Saint-Eustache	Laurentides	History	website, exhibit about the Lower Canada Rebellion
Maison de l'eau	Sherbrooke	Estrie	Natural history	website, located in Lucien-Bouchard Park, nature centre with live small animals, ecology of the river and park
Maison de Lime Ridge	Dudswell	Estrie	Natural history	information, geology and properties of limestone and area mining and industry
Maison de nos Aïeux	Île d'Orléans	Capitale-Nationale	History	website, local history, period room displays
Maison des Arts Drummondville	Drummondville	Centre-du-Québec	Art	website, includes the Galerie d’art Desjardins
Maison des arts de Laval	Laval	Laval	Art	website, performing arts centre with exhibit gallery
Maison des dunes Interpretation Centre	Tadoussac	Côte-Nord	Natural history	Located at the Baie-de-Tadoussac sector of Saguenay National Park, sand dunes, birds, and wildlife of the park
Maison Dr Joseph-Frenette	Causapscal	Gaspésie–Îles-de-la-Madeleine	Medical	website, rural doctor's home
Maison Drouin	Île d'Orléans	Capitale-Nationale	Historic house	website, operated by the Fondation François-Lamy, 18th-century period house
Maison Dumulon	Rouyn-Noranda	Abitibi-Témiscamingue	History	website, information, early 20th-century general store for the mining town
Maison Dupont	Saint-Narcisse	Mauricie	Historic house	information, late 19th-century "Québécoise" home
Maison du Frère-Moffet	Ville-Marie	Abitibi-Témiscamingue	Historic house	website, 1881 home of town's founder
Maison du Granit	Lac-Drolet	Estrie	Art	website, granite workshop and sculptures
Maison Girardin	Lac-Beauport	Capitale-Nationale	Multiple	website, historic house, local history and art, operated by the Société d'art et d'histoire de Beauport
Maison Lamontagne	Rimouski	Bas-Saint-Laurent	Historic house	website, 18th-century house
Maison de la culture Lenoblet-du-Plessis	Contrecœur	Montérégie	History	website, historic house with local history exhibits, site of area meetings during the Rebellions of 1837
Maison LePailleur	Châteauguay	Montérégie	Multiple	website, 1792 house with art and local history exhibits
Maison Louis-Bertrand	L'Isle-Verte	Bas-Saint-Laurent	Historic house	website, 19th-century house
Maison Louis-Hippolyte-Lafontaine	Boucherville	Montérégie	Multiple	information, childhood home of Prime Minister Louis-Hippolyte Lafontaine, features exhibits of art, photography and local history
Maison Louis-Cyr	Saint-Jean-de-Matha	Lanaudière	Biographical	website, life of Canadian strongman Louis Cyr
Maison natale de Louis-Fréchette	Lévis	Chaudière-Appalaches	Historic house	website, 19th-century home of author Louis-Honoré Fréchette
Maison nationale des Patriotes	Saint-Denis-sur-Richelieu	Montérégie	Historic house	website, 1830s period home and guided tour about the Rebellions of 1837
Maison Ozias-Leduc	Mont-Saint-Hilaire	Montérégie	Art	website, includes interpretive center home and birthplace home of painter Ozias Leduc, operated by the Musée des beaux-arts de Mont-Saint-Hilaire
Maison Paul-Emile Borduas	Mont-Saint-Hilaire	Montérégie	Art	website, regional art exhibits in the home of painter Paul-Émile Borduas, operated by the Musée des beaux-arts de Mont-Saint-Hilaire
Maison Rocheleau	Trois-Rivières	Mauricie	Historic house	website, 1740 house restored to New France era
Maison Rodolphe Duguay	Nicolet	Centre-du-Québec	Art	website, works by artist Rodolphe Duguay and changing art exhibits
Maison Rosalie-Cadron	Lavaltrie	Lanaudière	Historic house	website, early 19th-century period house
Maison sir Étienne-Paschal-Taché	Montmagny	Chaudière-Appalaches	Historic house	website, life and mid-19th-century home of Father of Confederation, Sir Étienne-Paschal Taché
Maison Trestler	Vaudreuil-Dorion	Montérégie	Historic house	website, also art gallery
Manoir Boucher de Niverville	Trois-Rivières	Mauricie	Historic house	website, 1730 manor with local history exhibit
Manoir Le Boutillier	Gaspé	Gaspésie–Îles-de-la-Madeleine	Historic house	website, mid-19th-century period home of political figure John Le Boutillier
Manoir Mauvide-Genest	Saint-Jean-de-l'Île-d'Orléans	Capitale-Nationale	Historic house	website, 18th-century period home and interpretation center for the seigneurial system of New France
Manoir Papineau National Historic Site	Montebello	Outaouais	Historic house	website, manor home of reformist leader Louis-Joseph Papineau, furnishings from 1850 to 1929
Manoir seigneurial Fraser	Rivière-du-Loup	Bas-Saint-Laurent	Historic house	website, 1830 manor home of city's founder with family furnishings, art gallery
Marine Environment Discovery Centre	Les Escoumins	Côte-Nord	Natural history	website, information, marine life of the Saint Lawrence River estuary, part of the Saguenay-St. Lawrence Marine Park
Matamajaw Historical Site	Causapscal	Gaspésie–Îles-de-la-Madeleine	Sports	website, historic salmon fishing club
Miellerie Lune de Miel	Stoke	Estrie	Food	website, economuseum about beekeeping and honey
Miguasha National Park	Nouvelle	Gaspésie–Îles-de-la-Madeleine	Natural history	Fossil fish and plants, important fossil site
Mine Crystal	Bonsecours	Estrie	Natural history	website, quartz crystal mine and minerals exhibit
Mingan Island Cetacean Study	Longue-Pointe-de-Mingan	Côte-Nord	Natural history	website, the interpretation center features exhibits about marine mammals in the St. Lawrence River and the work of the organization
Mokotakan	Saint-Mathieu-du-Parc	Mauricie	First Nations	Open air tour of buildings of the 10 nations of Quebec and the Inuit, adjacent to usée de la Faune
Moulin à carder Grouleau	East Broughton	Chaudière-Appalaches	Industry	information, working wool carding mill
Moulin à laine d'Ulverton (Ulverton Woolen Mills)	Ulverton	Estrie	Industry	website, textile industry
Moulin Bernier	Courcelles-Saint-Évariste	Chaudière-Appalaches	Multiple	website, history of the historic flour and saw mill, local history and art exhibits, permanent exhibition on maple syrup
Moulin de La Chevrotière	Deschambault-Grondines	Capitale-Nationale	History	website, historic mill, exhibits on local history
Moulin de la Rémy	Baie-Saint-Paul	Capitale-Nationale	Mill	information, restored early 19th-century flour mill and outbuildings
Moulin des pionniers	La Doré	Saguenay–Lac-Saint-Jean	Forestry	website, historic sawmill, ancestral home, small farm and log driving camp
Moulin La Lorraine	Lac-Etchemin	Chaudière-Appalaches	Multiple	website, historic flour mill and art center
Moulin Légaré	Saint-Eustache	Laurentides	Mill	website, 18th-century flour mill
Moulin Michel de Gentilly	Bécancour	Centre-du-Québec	Mill	website, historic flour mill
Moulin seigneurial de Pointe-du-Lac	Pointe-du-Lac	Mauricie	Mill	website, historic flour mill and saw mill
Moulins de L’Isle-aux-Coudres	L'Isle-aux-Coudres	Capitale-Nationale	Mill	website, economuseum of a historic windmill for flour and water-powered sawmill
Moulin du Petit-Pré	Château-Richer	Capitale-Nationale	Mill	Lat 17th-century water-powered flour mill
Musée acadien du Québec à Bonaventure	Bonaventure	Gaspésie–Îles-de-la-Madeleine	Ethnic	website, Acadian history and culture in Quebec
Musée amérindien de Mashteuiatsh	Mashteuiatsh	Saguenay–Lac-Saint-Jean	First Nations	website
Musée amérindien et inuit de Godbout	Godbout	Côte-Nord	First Nations	information, art and culture
Musée antique Victor Bélanger	Saint-Côme–Linière	Chaudière-Appalaches	Multiple	information, Facebook site, antique automobiles, collections of antique toys, telephones, clocks, lamps, salt recipients, dolls, irons collections, heritage village including a school house, chapel, general store, saloon, sugar house, old-style bread oven, covered bridge, garages, carpenter store, Canadian-style house and a handicrafts house
Musée Armand-Frappier	Laval	Laval	Science	website, life sciences and health
Musée Beaulne	Coaticook	Estrie	Multiple	website, early 20th-century historic house, history of its owners, costumes and textiles collection, changing exhibits of art, photography, local history
Musée Bruck	Cowansville	Montérégie	Multiple	information, local history andart
Musée canadien de l'Arme et du Bronze	Granby	Montérégie	Military	website, focus is firearms, bronze sculptures, coins and stamps
Musée Chafaud	Percé	Gaspésie–Îles-de-la-Madeleine	Art	website, area art
Musée d'art contemporain de Baie-Saint-Paul	Baie-Saint-Paul	Capitale-Nationale	Art	Contemporary art
Musée d'art contemporain des Laurentides	Saint-Jérôme	Laurentides	Art	website, contemporary art
Musée d'art de Joliette	Joliette	Lanaudière	Art	website
Musée des beaux-arts de Mont-Saint-Hilaire	Mont-Saint-Hilaire	Montérégie	Art	website, focus is Quebec regional art, also operates the Maison Paul-Emile Borduas and Maison Ozias Leduc
Musée de Buckingham	Buckingham	Outaouais	History	website, local history
Musée de Charlevoix	La Malbaie	Capitale-Nationale	Multiple	website, art, local history and culture
Musée de Guérin	Guérin	Abitibi-Témiscamingue	History	website, local and rural history, agriculture, religious life and heritage
Musée de l'Accordéon	Montmagny	Chaudière-Appalaches	Music	website, accordion collection located in the 1800 Manoir Couillard-Dupuis
Musée de l'auto ancienne de Richmond	Richmond	Estrie	Automotive	website, open in summer, antique automobiles
Musée de la culture populaire du Québec (Quebec Museum of Folk Culture)	Trois-Rivières	Mauricie	Multiple	website, area history, culture, art, folk art,
Musée de la Défense aérienne Bagotville Air Defence Museum	Bagotville	Saguenay–Lac-Saint-Jean	Aviation	website, history of military aviation, including CFB Bagotville
Musée de la Faune	Saint-Mathieu-du-Parc	Mauricie	Natural history	website, wildlife dioramas, adjacent to Mokotakan
Musée de la femme	Longueuil	Montérégie	Women's	website, women's issues, contributions in Quebec, civil rights, art
Musée de la Gare	Témiscaming	Abitibi-Témiscamingue	Railway	website, railway and local history, located in a 1927 train station
Musée de la Gaspésie	Gaspé	Gaspésie–Îles-de-la-Madeleine	Multiple	website, Gaspesian history, culture, natural history, works of Gaspesian artists
Musée de la grange octogonale Adolphe-Gagnon	Saint-Fabien	Bas-Saint-Laurent	Agriculture	website, 1888 octagonal barn with agriculture tools and equipment
Musée de la Mer	Havre-Aubert (Îles-de-la-Madeleine)	Gaspésie–Îles-de-la-Madeleine	Maritime	website, includes ship and lighthouse models, fishing industry, maritime artifacts, shells, island rocks and minerals, island history
Musée de la nature	Sainte-Rose-du-Nord	Saguenay–Lac-Saint-Jean	Natural history	website
Musée de la Neufve-France	Sainte-Flavie	Gaspésie–Îles-de-la-Madeleine	History	website, located in the Vieux Moulin (Old Mill), features New France and First Nations artifacts
Musée de la petite maison blanche	Chicoutimi	Saguenay–Lac-Saint-Jean	Historic house	website, 1900 house that survived the Saguenay Flood of 1996
Musée de la poste et Boutique de forge / Parc Héritage	Saint-Marc-de-Figuery	Abitibi-Témiscamingue	History	information, includes 1930s postmaster's office and blacksmith shop
Musée des Abénakis	Odanak	Centre-du-Québec	First Nations	website, history, culture and art of the Western Abenaki people
Musée des beaux-arts de Sherbrooke; Sherbrooke Museum of Fine Arts	Sherbrooke	Estrie	Art	Focus is artists of the Eastern townships
Musée des communications et d'histoire de Sutton	Sutton	Montérégie	Multiple	website, local history and culture, changes in communication
Musée des Coquillages	Saint-Tite-des-Caps	Capitale-Nationale	Natural history	website, seashells from around the world
MUSO - Musée de société des Deux-Rives	Salaberry-de-Valleyfield	Montérégie	Local	website, local history, culture and art
Musée des Filles de Jesus	Trois-Rivières	Mauricie	Religious	website, history of the work of the Daughters of Jesus in education, hospital care and distant missions, and a historic chapel
Musée des ondes Emile Berliner	Montréal	Montréal	Technology and science	website music recording history, site-specific museum in the historic Berliner Gramophone Building
Musée des phares	La Martre	Gaspésie–Îles-de-la-Madeleine	Maritime	website, La Martre Lighthouse with exhibits about the evolution and importance of area lighthouses
Musée des Religions du Monde	Nicolet	Centre-du-Québec	Religious	website, religious practices and beliefs of Buddhism, Hinduism, Islam, Judaism and Christianity
Museum of the Sisters of the Holy Rosary	Rimouski	Bas-Saint-Laurent	Religious	website, history and artifacts of the convent
Musée des Ursulines de Trois-Rivières	Trois-Rivières	Mauricie	Religious	website, history of the Ursuline monastery, school and hospital, religious artifacts
Musée du 12 RBC	Trois-Rivières	Mauricie	Military	information, history of the 12^{e} Régiment blindé du Canada
Musée du Bas-Saint-Laurent	Rivière-du-Loup	Bas-Saint-Laurent	Art	website, contemporary art and ethnology
Musée du bronze d'Inverness	Inverness	Centre-du-Québec	Art	website, economuseum of a bronze workshop and gallery
Musée du Bûcheron	Grandes-Piles	Mauricie	Forestry	information, replica of a typical logging camp from 1850 to 1950 with over 20 buildings and equipment
Musée du chocolat	Bromont	Montérégie	Food	website, adjacent to the Confiserie Bromont
Musée du Fjord	Saguenay	Saguenay–Lac-Saint-Jean	Multiple	website, maritime history, natural and cultural history of the region by the Saguenay – St. Lawrence Marine Park
Musée du Fort Saint-Jean	Saint-Jean-sur-Richelieu	Montérégie	Military	History and artifacts of the 17th-century French fort and the Collège militaire royal de Saint-Jean
Musée du fromage cheddar	Saint-Prime	Saguenay–Lac-Saint-Jean	Food	website, making of cheddar cheese and a historical recreation of a 20th-century cheesemaker's home
Musée du golf du Québec	Granby	Montérégie	Sports	website
Musée du Haut-Richelieu	Saint-Jean-sur-Richelieu	Montérégie	Multiple	website, local history and decorative arts pottery
Musée du Régiment de la Chaudière	Lévis	Chaudière-Appalaches	Military	information, WW II Le Régiment de la Chaudière
Musée du ski des Laurentides	Saint-Sauveur	Laurentides	Sports	website, history of skiing in the Laurentian mountains, ski equipment and memorabilia
Musée du squelette	Saint-Louis-du-Ha! Ha!	Bas-Saint-Laurent	Natural history	information, skeletons and osteology
Musée du Témiscouata	Notre-Dame-du-Lac	Bas-Saint-Laurent	Multiple	website, local history and art
Musée Edison du Phonographe	Sainte-Anne-de-Beaupré	Capitale-Nationale	Technology	website, historic phonograph machines
Musée Frederick Janssoone	Trois-Rivières	Mauricie	Biographical	website, life of Franciscan missionary Father Frédéric Janssoone
Musée Jeux Vidéo et VFX	Sherbrooke	Estrie	Art	website, video games history and special effects for cinema
Musée Gilles Villeneuve	Berthierville	Lanaudière	Biographical	website, Formula One race car driver Gilles Villeneuve
Musée Honoré-Mercier	Sainte-Anne-de-Sabrevois	Montérégie	Biographical	information, birthplace home and exhibits about Honoré Mercier, 9th Premier of Quebec
Musée Huron-wendake	Wendake	Capitale-Nationale	First Nations	website, history and culture of the Iroquois and Algonquin
Musée international d'art naïf de Magog	Magog	Estrie	Art	website, naive art
Musée Joseph-Filion	Sainte-Thérèse	Laurentides	History	website, local history
Musée la Maison Horace-Bouffard	Matane	Gaspésie–Îles-de-la-Madeleine	Historic house	information, turn-of-the-century traditional country home
Musée Laurier	Victoriaville	Centre-du-Québec	Multiple	website, includes the Maison Wilfrid-Laurier, the Victorian period summer home of former Canadian Prime Minister Sir Wilfrid Laurier; Hotel des Postes, a fine arts and historic exhibition centre
Musée les Voitures d'eau	L'Isle-aux-Coudres	Capitale-Nationale	Maritime	website, seafarers and sail craft on the St. Lawrence River
Musée Louis-Hémon	Péribonka	Saguenay–Lac-Saint-Jean	Biographical	website, works of author Louis Hémon, and other Quebec authors and literature
Musée maritime de Charlevoix	Saint-Joseph-de-la-Rive	Capitale-Nationale	Maritime	website, former shipyard with outbuildings, schooners
Musée Marius-Barbeau	Saint-Joseph-de-Beauce	Chaudière-Appalaches	Multiple	website, local history displays, decorative arts, and art exhibits
Musée minéralogique de l'Abitibi-Témiscamingue	Malartic	Abitibi-Témiscamingue	Natural history	website, rocks, minerals, fossils
Musée minéralogique et d'histoire minière (Asbestos Mineral Museum)	Asbestos	Estrie	Natural history	information, rocks, minerals, history of the Jeffrey asbestos mine, located in a section of the town's municipal library
Musée Minéralogique et Minier de Thetford Mines	Thetford Mines	Chaudière-Appalaches	Mining	website, geology, minerals and mining history of the region
Musée minier Horne	Rouyn-Noranda	Abitibi-Témiscamingue	Mining	website, copper mining, named after businessman and prospector Edmond Henry Horne
Musée Missisquoi	Stanbridge East	Montérégie	History	website, county history, historic general store, agriculture machinery, carriages and sleighs
Musée Pierre-Boucher	Trois-Rivières	Mauricie	Art	Part of the Séminaire Saint-Joseph de Trois-Rivières, religious and decorative arts
Musée Populaire de la Photographie	Drummondville	Centre-du-Québec	Art	website, photography and equipment
Musée pour enfants de Laval	Laval	Laval	Children's	website
Musée québécois de l’agriculture et de l’alimentation	La Pocatière	Bas-Saint-Laurent	Multiple	Local history, period room and business displays, natural history, agriculture, transportation; also known as Musée québécois de l'agriculture et de l'alimentation
Musée régional de Kamouraska	Kamouraska	Bas-Saint-Laurent	History	website, local history, period room displays and antiques
Musée régional de la Côte-Nord	Sept-Îles	Côte-Nord	Multiple	website, art, local history, archaeology, natural history, First Nations artifacts
Musée régional de Rimouski	Rimouski	Bas-Saint-Laurent	Multiple	website, contemporary art, history and science
Musée régional de Vaudreuil-Soulanges	Vaudreuil-Dorion	Montérégie	Multiple	website, local history, culture and folk art
Musée Saint-Laurent	Trois-Pistoles	Bas-Saint-Laurent	Automotive	website, vintage and classic cars, farm machinery and antiques
Musée sur l'enseignement	Saint-Pierre-de-Broughton	Chaudière-Appalaches	Education	information, one room schoolhouse
Musée Zénon Alary	Sainte-Adèle	Laurentides	Art	information, animal sculptures by Zénon Alary
Museum of Ingenuity J. Armand Bombardier	Valcourt	Estrie	Transportation	website, snowmobiles and snow transport, life and work of Joseph Armand Bombardier
Odyssée des Bâtisseurs	Alma	Saguenay–Lac-Saint-Jean	Multiple	website, hydroelectricity, area industrial development and history, importance of water in the region's development
ONHOÜA CHETEK8E	Wendake	Capitale-Nationale	First Nations	website, authentic recreation of a Wendat village
Parc du Bourg de Pabos Interpretation Centre	Pabos Mills	Gaspésie–Îles-de-la-Madeleine	History	website, includes archaeological remains of prehistoric, First Nations and early settlers, restored 18th-century fishermen's hut, 19th-century forestry industry remains, history of British attacks in the 18th century
Parc historique de la Pointe-du-Moulin	Notre-Dame-de-l'Île-Perrot	Montérégie	Historic house	website, 18th-century windmill, miller's house and interpretation center of rural life in New France
Parc historique de la Poudrière de Windsor	Windsor	Estrie	Industry	website, former powder mill with many buildings
Parc maritime de Saint-Laurent	Île d'Orléans	Capitale-Nationale	Maritime	website, historic shipyard
Parc national de l'île-Bonaventure-et-du-Rocher-Percé	Percé	Gaspésie–Îles-de-la-Madeleine	Natural history	Discovery center exhibits about the park's large bird colony, marine life, geology, ecosystems and history
Pavillon de la Faune	Stratford	Estrie	Natural history	website, wildlife dioramas and live animals
Petit Musée du Chapeau	Saint-Valentin	Montérégie	Textile	website, hats and hat-making tools
Petites Franciscaines de Marie Museum	Baie-Saint-Paul	Capitale-Nationale	Religious	website, history and activities of the religious congregation and its founder
Phare du Cap de Madeleine	Sainte-Madeleine-de-la-Rivière-Madeleine	Gaspésie–Îles-de-la-Madeleine	Multiple	information, lighthouse and exhibits about local history and the 1920s paper mill
Plein sud	Longueuil	Montérégie	Art	website, contemporary art exhibition centre
Pointe-du-Buisson Archaeological Park	Melocheville	Montérégie	Archaeology	website, archaeological site and exhibits of 5000 years of Amerindian artifacts
Pointe-Noire Interpretation and Observation Centre	Pointe-Noire	Côte-Nord	Natural history	website, marine life of the Saint Lawrence River estuary, part of the Saguenay-St. Lawrence Marine Park
Poste de Traite Chauvin (Chauvin Trading Post)	Tadoussac	Côte-Nord	History	information, information, recreated 1600 fur trading post with exhibits about pre-history, the meeting of two nations, trading, the oil trade (whale hunting) and the trading post
Presbytère Saint-Nicolas	Saint-Nicolas	Chaudière-Appalaches	Multiple	website, art and local history exhibits
Pulperie de Chicoutimie	Chicoutimi	Saguenay–Lac-Saint-Jean	Multiple	website, local history and culture, art exhibits, works of primitive artist Arthur Villeneuve, history of the paper company
Reford Gardens	Grand-Métis	Bas-Saint-Laurent	Multiple	Botanical gardens and Estevan Lodge with botanical art exhibits and a permanent display about the garden owners
Richmond County Historical Society Museum	Richmond	Estrie	Historic house	website, located in Melbourne Township, late 19th-century period house
Saguenay Fjord Interpretation Centre	Rivière-Éternité	Côte-Nord	Natural history	Located at the Baie-Éternité sector of Saguenay National Park, geology and natural history of the fjord
Saint Anthony's Shrine	Lac-Bouchette	Saguenay–Lac-Saint-Jean	Religious	website, shrine dedicated to Saint Anthony of Padua and Our Lady of Lourdes, includes museum about the shrine's founders
Saint-Jacques-de-Leeds Historic Site	Saint-Jacques-de-Leeds	Chaudière-Appalaches	History	information, local history, tours of historic sites
Saint Lawrence Exploration Centre	Rivière-du-Loup	Bas-Saint-Laurent	Natural history	website, ecosystem, animal and plant life of the Saint Lawrence River
Saint-Ours Canal National Historic Site	Saint-Ours	Montérégie	Transportation	website, exhibits about the canal in the superintendent's office
Seigneurie des Aulnaies	Saint-Roch-des-Aulnaies	Chaudière-Appalaches	Living	website, 19th-century Victorian period mansion with working flour mill, gardens, history of the seigneurial system of New France
Sherbrooke Nature and Science Museum	Sherbrooke	Estrie	Natural history	Animal and bird mounts, fossils, rocks and minerals, archaeology
Sir Wilfrid Laurier National Historic Site	Saint-Lin-Laurentides	Lanaudière	Historic house	website, mid-19th-century period birthplace home of Canadian Prime Minister Sir Wilfrid Laurier
Site de la Nouvelle-France	Saint-Félix-d'Otis	Saguenay–Lac-Saint-Jean	Living	website, four reenactments of 17th-century Quebec City
Site de Pêche Déry	Pont-Rouge	Capitale-Nationale	History	website, local history, including the first toll bridge in Quebec and salmon fishing on the Rivière Jacques-Cartier
Site historique de l'Île-des-Moulins	Terrebonne	Lanaudière	Open air	website, 19th-century pre-industrial complex including the seigneury office, bakery, flour mill, saw mill and carding mill
Site historique Domaine Breen	Saint-Bruno-de-Guigues	Abitibi-Témiscamingue	Historic house	website, early 20th-century house and local history and mining exhibits
Site historique de Pointe-à-la-Renommée	Gaspé	Gaspésie–Îles-de-la-Madeleine	Maritime	website, lighthouse, exhibits about lighthouse keepers and North America's first maritime radio station installed here by Guglielmo Marconi in 1904
Site historique maritime de la Pointe-au-Père	Rimouski	Bas-Saint-Laurent	Maritime	Includes the history and artifacts from sunken ocean liner RMS Empress of Ireland, the submarine HMCS Onondaga (S73) and the Pointe-au-Père Lighthouse and related buildings
Site historique des Pères Trappistes	Sainte-Justine	Chaudière-Appalaches	Religious	website, historic buildings and history of the Trappist monks who founded the community
Site Mary Travers dite "La Bolduc"	Newport	Gaspésie–Îles-de-la-Madeleine	Biographical	website, life and work of author-composer-singer Mary Travers (La Bolduc)
Société d'histoire et du patrimoine de la région de La Sarre	La Sarre	Abitibi-Témiscamingue	History	website, local history
Société d'histoire de Sherbrooke	Sherbrooke	Estrie	History	website, local history
Symmes Inn Museum	Gatineau	Outaouais	History	website, local history, located in an early 19th-century inn
T.E. Draper	Laverlochère-Angliers	Abitibi-Témiscamingue	Maritime	website, tugboat museum ship used in the logging industry
Tithing Interpretation Centre	Sainte-Flavie	Gaspésie–Îles-de-la-Madeleine	Multiple	information, 19th-century tithe barn with displays on local history, agriculture, fossils including trilobites, brachiopods, cephalopods, dinosaur remains, fossilized trees, petrified plants, rocks and minerals
Tomcod Interpretation Centre	Sainte-Anne-de-la-Pérade	Mauricie	Industry	website, aspects of tomcod fishing
Tugboat Pythonga	Maniwaki	Outaouais	Maritime	website, tugboat used to tow timber in the Baskatong reservoir
Uplands Cultural and Heritage Centre	Sherbrooke	Estrie	Multiple	website, local history and art
Vieille prison de Trois-Rivières (Old Prison of Trois-Rivières)	Trois-Rivières	Mauricie	Prison	website, 1960s-70s prison experience
Vieux presbytère de Batiscan	Pointe-du-Lac	Mauricie	Historic house	website, mid-19th-century parish priest's home
Village historique de Val-Jalbert	Val-Jalbert	Saguenay–Lac-Saint-Jean	Open air	1920s paper mill town
Vieux Presbytère de Deschambault	Deschambault-Grondines	Capitale-Nationale	Multiple	website, information, historic rectory with local history and art exhibits
Village Québécois d'Antan	Drummondville	Centre-du-Québec	Open air	Reconstituted Quebec village of the mid-19th and early 20th centuries
Vintage Wings of Canada	Gatineau	Outaouais	Aviation	Early history of powered flight, classic aircraft
Whiteley Museum	Bonne Espérance	Côte-Nord	History	website, local history and culture

== Defunct museums ==
- Aux couleurs de la campagne, Saint-Jean-sur-Richelieu
- Centre national des naufrages du Saint-Laurent, Baie-Trinité
- Fort de la Martiniere, Lévis
- Jardin des glaciers, Baie-Comeau
- Musée Bon-Pasteur, closed in 2014
- Musée de bateaux miniatures et légendes du Bas-Saint-Laurent, Rivière-du-Loup, closed in 2014
- Musée du Domaine, Pohénégamook
- Musée Normantique, Saint-Alexandre, closed and contents auctioned in 2015
- Parc de l'aventure basque en Amérique, Trois-Pistoles
- Quebec Wax Museum (Musée de Cire), closed in 2007, figures now at the Musée de la civilisation

== See also ==
- Culture of Quebec
- Quebec
- Nature centres in Quebec
