= List of museums in Quebec City =

This is a list of museums in Quebec City, Canada. Also included are non-profit art galleries and university art galleries. Museums that exist only in cyberspace (i.e., virtual museums) are not included.

- See also List of museums in Montreal for museums in the Montreal region.
- See also List of museums in Quebec for museums in the rest of the province.

== Museums ==
Name	Neighbourhood	Borough	Type	Summary
Artillery Park Heritage Site	Old Quebec - Upper Town	La Cité-Limoilou	Military	Website, 1830s fort, part of Fortifications of Québec National Historic Site
Cartier-Brébeuf National Historic Site		La Cité-Limoilou	History	Park with exhibits and tours about the story of Jacques Cartier, Jesuit missionaries and Amerindian nations of the 16th and 17th centuries
Centre d'exposition de la bibliothèque Gabrielle-Roy	Saint-Roch	La Cité-Limoilou	Library	Website, exhibit gallery of the Gabrielle-Roy Library
Centre d'interprétation de la chute Kabir Kouba	Loretteville	La Haute-Saint-Charles	Natural history	Fossils, rocks, wildlife, history of the Kabir Kouba Waterfalls
Centre d'interprétation historique de Sainte-Foy	Sainte-Foy	Sainte-Foy–Sillery–Cap-Rouge	History	Website, local history, operated by the borough
Choco-Musée Érico	Saint-Jean-Baptiste	La Cité-Limoilou	Food	Website, chocolate shop and history of chocolate
Citadelle of Quebec	Old Quebec - Upper Town	La Cité-Limoilou	Military	Tours include the history of the military garrison, the Royal 22^{e} Régiment Museum, and a former military prison
Économusée du vitrail	Vieux-Limoilou	La Cité-Limoilou	Art	Website, economuseum of stained glass workshop
Fortifications of Quebec National Historic Site	Old Quebec - Upper Town	La Cité-Limoilou	Military	Website, history and guided tours of the city's different fortification projects and defense strategies
Henry-Stuart House	Old Quebec - Upper Town	La Cité-Limoilou	Historic house	Website, late 19th-century period cottage
L'Îlot des Palais	Old Quebec - Lower Town	La Cité-Limoilou	History	Website, 18th-century archaeological site of old Quebec and city history
Maison Chevalier	Old Quebec - Lower Town	La Cité-Limoilou	Historic house	Website, managed by the Musée de la civilisation, includes Chesnay House, the Frérot House and the Chevalier House with 18th- and 19th- century furnishings and decor
Maison des Jésuites de Sillery	Sillery	Sainte-Foy–Sillery–Cap-Rouge	Historic house	Website, 18th-century Jesuit missionary and the Amerindians in early Quebec, operated by the borough
Maison Dorion-Coulombe		La Cité-Limoilou	History	Website, local history, operated by the Société de la rivière Saint-Charles
Maison Éphraim-Bédard	Charlesbourg	Charlesbourg	Historic house	Website, operated by La Société Historique de Charlesbourg, period rooms
Maison François-Xavier Garneau	Old Quebec - Lower Town	La Cité-Limoilou	Historic house	Website, late 19th-century Victoria period home of poet François-Xavier Garneau
Maison Hamel-Bruneau	Sainte-Foy	Sainte-Foy–Sillery–Cap-Rouge	Multiple	Website, cultural center, exhibits of art and science, operated by the borough
Maison Léon-Provancher	Cap-Rouge	Sainte-Foy–Sillery–Cap-Rouge	Natural history	Website, natural history and science
Maison O’Neill			Multiple	Website, historic house, history of the area and its inhabitants, changing exhibits of art
Martello Tower 1	Old Quebec - Upper Town	La Cité-Limoilou	Military	Early 19th-century soldier's life, military history of the Plains of Abraham
Morrin Centre	Old Quebec - Upper Town	La Cité-Limoilou	History	Evolution of Quebec's English-speaking community, includes tours of the 19th-century gaol and Morrin College
Moulin des Jésuites	Charlesbourg	Charlesbourg	Mill	Website, historic Jesuit grist mill, local history
Musée de géologie René-Bureau	Sainte-Foy	Sainte-Foy–Sillery–Cap-Rouge	Natural history	Website, fossils, rocks, minerals, part of Laval University
Musée de l'Amérique francophone (Museum of French America)	Old Quebec - Upper Town	La Cité-Limoilou	History	Managed by the Musée de la civilisation, colonial history of America, the evolution of Francophone culture in North America and abroad, and arts and crafts in Québec
Musée de la civilisation (Museum of Civilization)	Old Quebec - Lower Town	La Cité-Limoilou	Multiple	Quebec history, First Nations and human culture and civilization
Musée de la Place-Royale	Old Quebec - Lower Town	La Cité-Limoilou	History	Website, part of the Musée de la civilisation complex, history of New France and Place-Royale through that of its inhabitants, from Samuel de Champlain to today
Musée des Augustines de l’Hôtel-Dieu de Québec	Old Quebec - Upper Town	La Cité-Limoilou	History	Website, work of the Augustines in Quebec, fine and decorative art, historic artifacts
Musée des Ursulines de Québec	Old Quebec - Upper Town	La Cité-Limoilou	Religious	History of the convent of the Ursulines of Quebec
Musée du Fort	Old Quebec - Upper Town	La Cité-Limoilou	Military	Website, military history of Quebec City
Musée national des beaux-arts du Québec (Quebec National Museum of Fine Arts)	Old Quebec - Upper Town	La Cité-Limoilou	Art	Focus is Quebec art
Musée naval de Québec (Naval Museum of Quebec)	Old Quebec - Lower Town	La Cité-Limoilou	Maritime	Website
Plains of Abraham Museum	Old Quebec - Lower Town	La Cité-Limoilou	History	History of Quebec and military activities at the Plains of Abraham
Villa Bagatelle	Sillery	Sainte-Foy–Sillery–Cap-Rouge	Historic house	Website, reproduction early 20th-century period cottage and garden, operated by the borough

== Defunct museums ==
- Quebec Wax Museum (Musée de Cire), closed in 2007, figures now at the Musée de la civilisation
