= Cité de l'Or =

Tourist attraction in Val-d'Or, Quebec, Canada

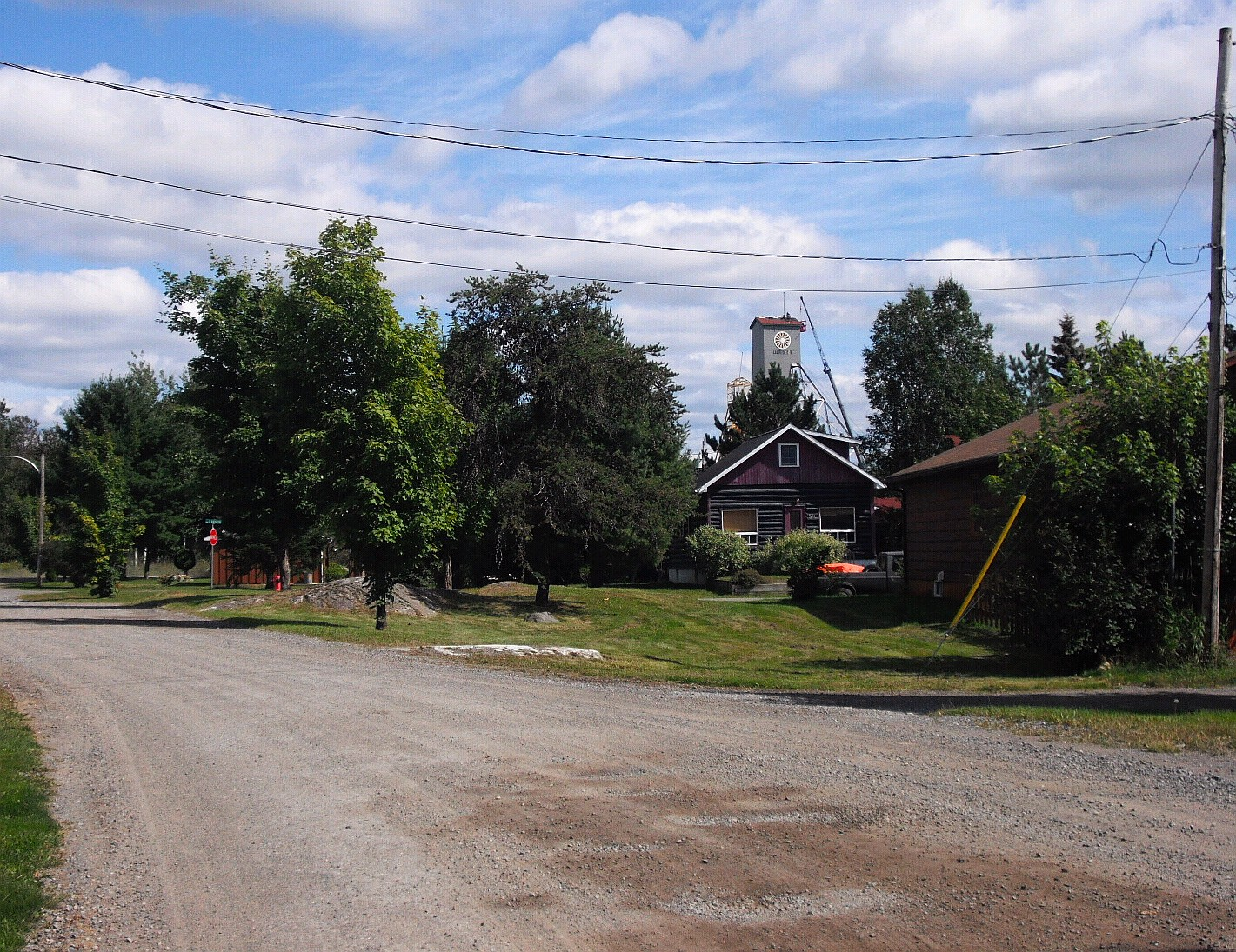
- Bourlamaque mining village
- Established: 1995
- Location: Val-d'Or, Abitibi region of Quebec, Canada
- Coordinates: 48.094°N 77.765°W
- Type: Gold mining
- Website: www.citedelor.com

National Historic Site of Canada
- Official name: Former Lamaque Mine and the Bourlamaque Mining Village National Historic Site
- Designated: 2012

Patrimoine culturel du Québec
- Type: Site historique classé
- Designated: 1979

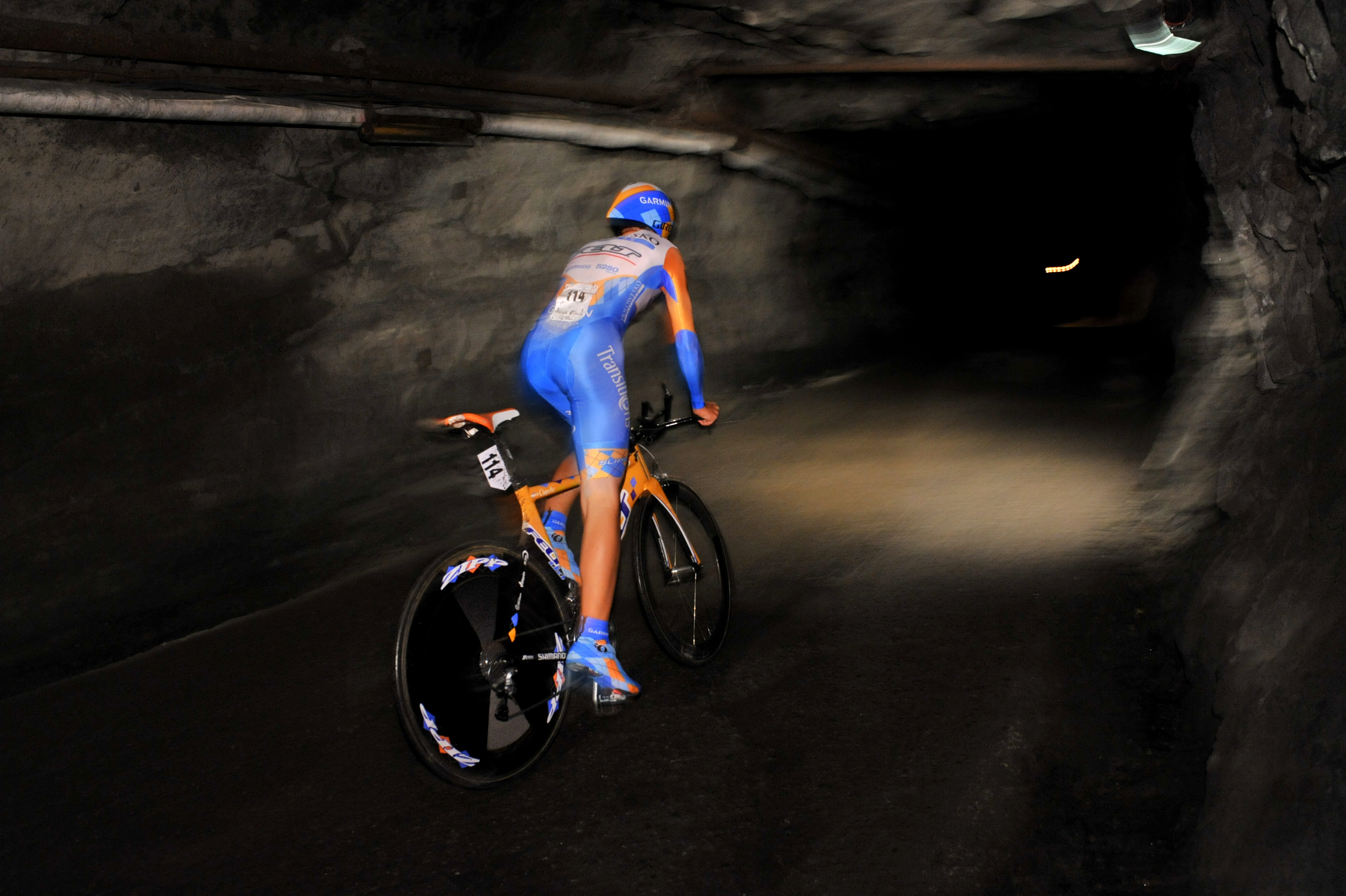
Underground stage of the Tour de l'Abitibi

The Cité de l'Or ("The City of Gold") is an attraction located in Val-d'Or, in the Abitibi-Témiscamingue region of Quebec, Canada. It has been operating since 1995 as a place where people can see what gold mining was like by touring the underground Lamaque gold mine and the Bourlamaque historic mining village. Bourlamaque was declared a provincial historic site in 1979 and a National Historic Site in 2012.

In 1923, the gold deposit was discovered and in 1935, the mine came in operation. In 1985, it was exhausted and closed.

Since 2000, one stage of the Tour de l'Abitibi takes place in the underground mine, some 300 feet (91 m) below ground. Cyclists must ride through the tunnels and up the access ramp (a 17% slope) before they race through the streets of Val-d'Or.

Since 2007, Cité de l'Or also became a training location for new miners.

== Affiliations ==
The Museum is affiliated with: CMA, CHIN and Virtual Museum of Canada.

== See also ==
- List of museums in Quebec
- Culture of Quebec
- Gold extraction
- Gold prospecting
- Placer mining
- Quartz reef mining
