= Musée Grévin Montreal =

Former wax museum in Montreal, Quebec

- Musée Grévin Montreal
- Established: April 17, 2013
- Dissolved: September 16, 2021
- Location: Montreal Eaton Centre, Ville-Marie, Montreal, Quebec, Canada
- Coordinates: 45°30′13″N 73°34′16″W
- Type: Wax museum

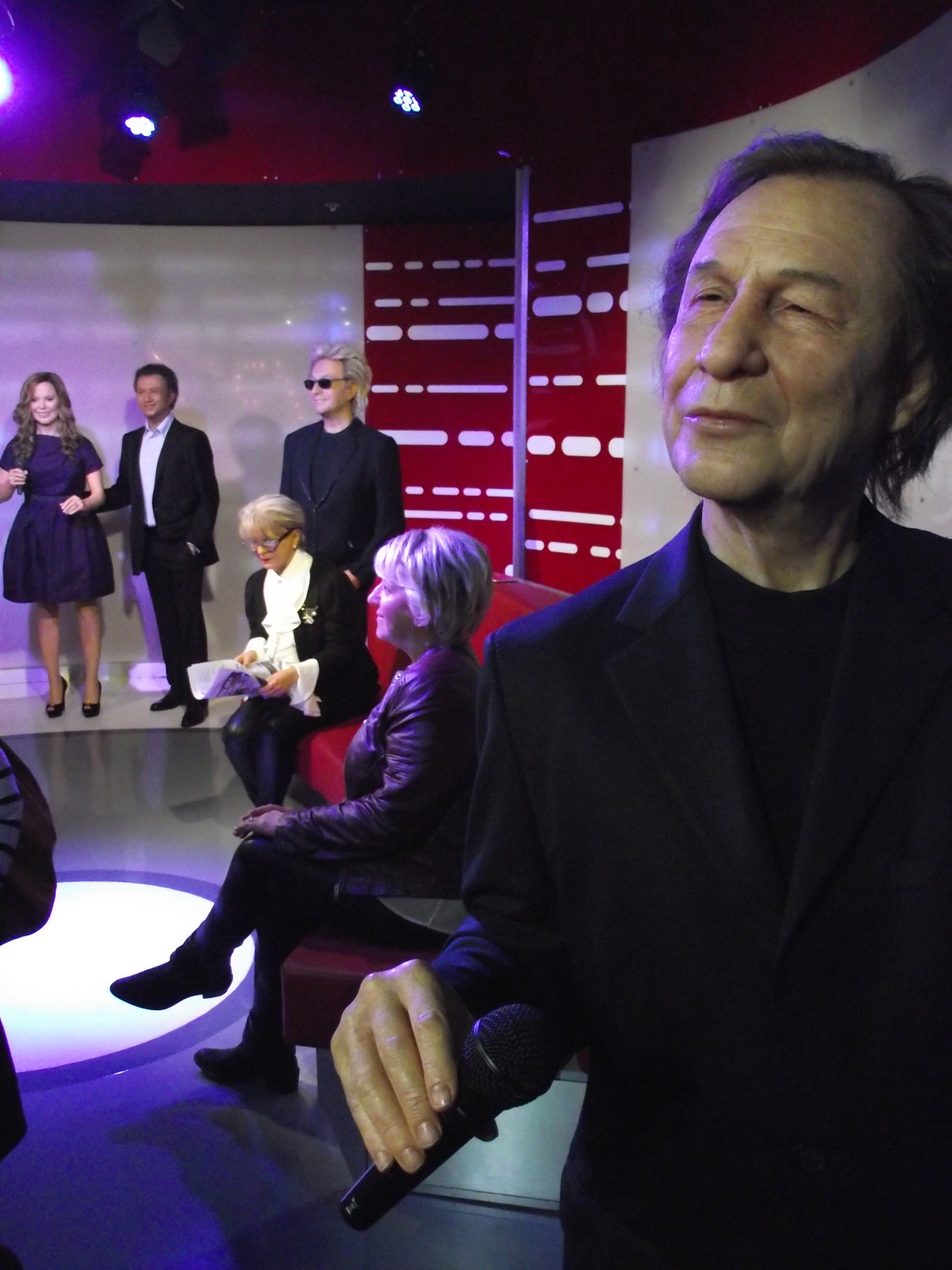
A waxwork of Jean-Pierre Ferland

The Musée Grévin Montreal was a waxwork museum in Montreal located in Montreal Eaton Centre in Ville-Marie, Montreal, Quebec, Canada. It was open daily; an admission fee was charged.

== History ==
On April 17, 2013, Musée Grévin's parent company, Compagnie des Alpes, opened the museum's first property outside France, Grévin Montréal, at the Montreal Eaton Centre in Montreal, Canada. Similar in scope to the original Paris location, Grévin Montréal features wax adaptations of people relevant to Canadian and Québécois history and culture.

The next location of Compagnie des Alpes, Musée Grévin Prague is open since May 1, 2014.

The museum was situated in an old cinema complex known as the "Famous Players Centre Eaton 6".

On September 16, 2021, the museum announced it was permanently closing, effective immediately.

== Attractions ==
The Musée Grévin contained some 120 characters arranged in scenes from the history of Canada from Jacques Cartier and modern life, movie stars and international figures such as Elizabeth II, Scarlett Johansson, Albert Einstein, Lady Gaga, Mahatma Gandhi, Donald Sutherland, Leonardo DiCaprio or Naomi Campbell.

New wax characters were regularly added to the Museum.

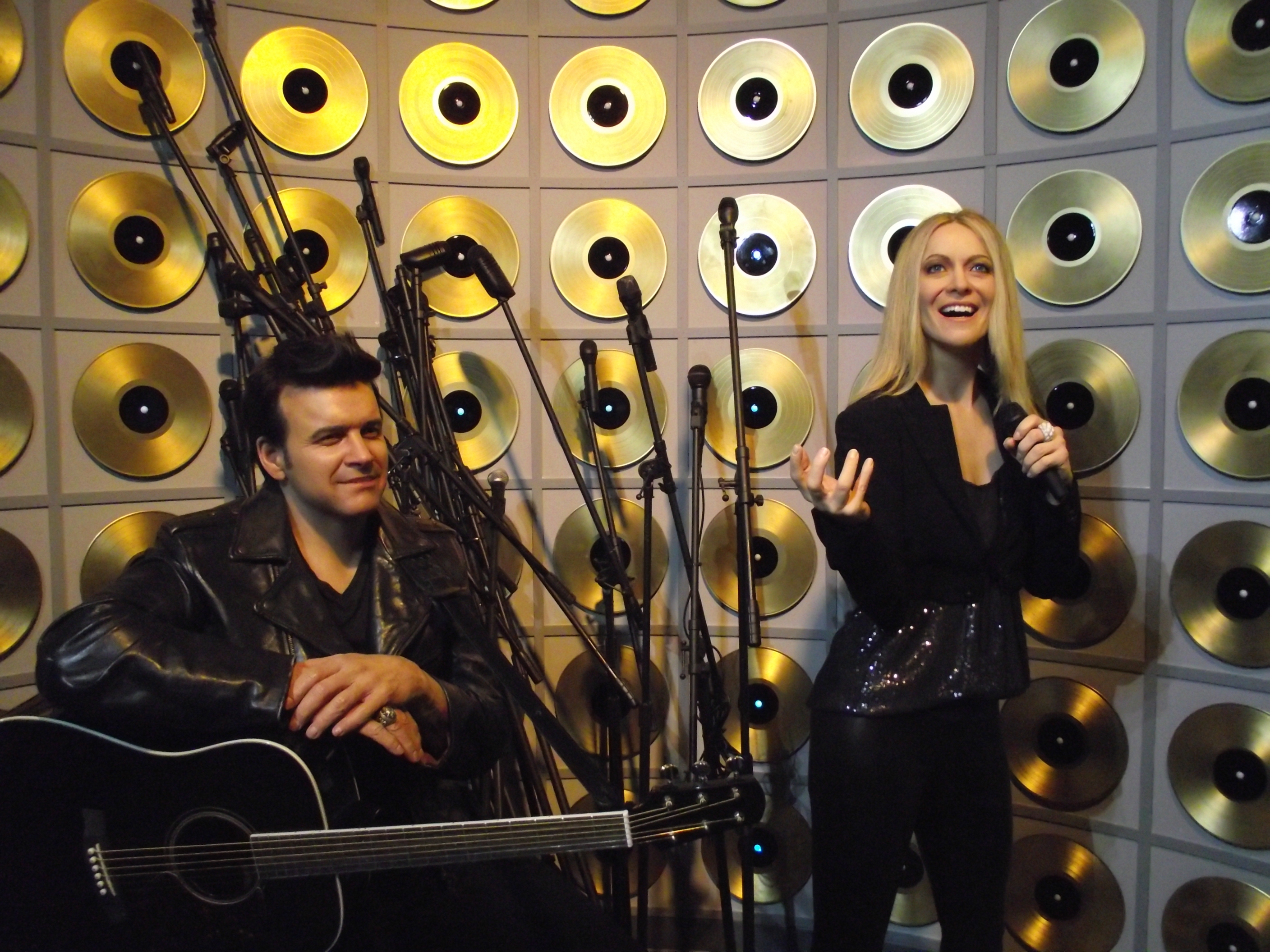
Roch Voisine and Véronic DiCaire

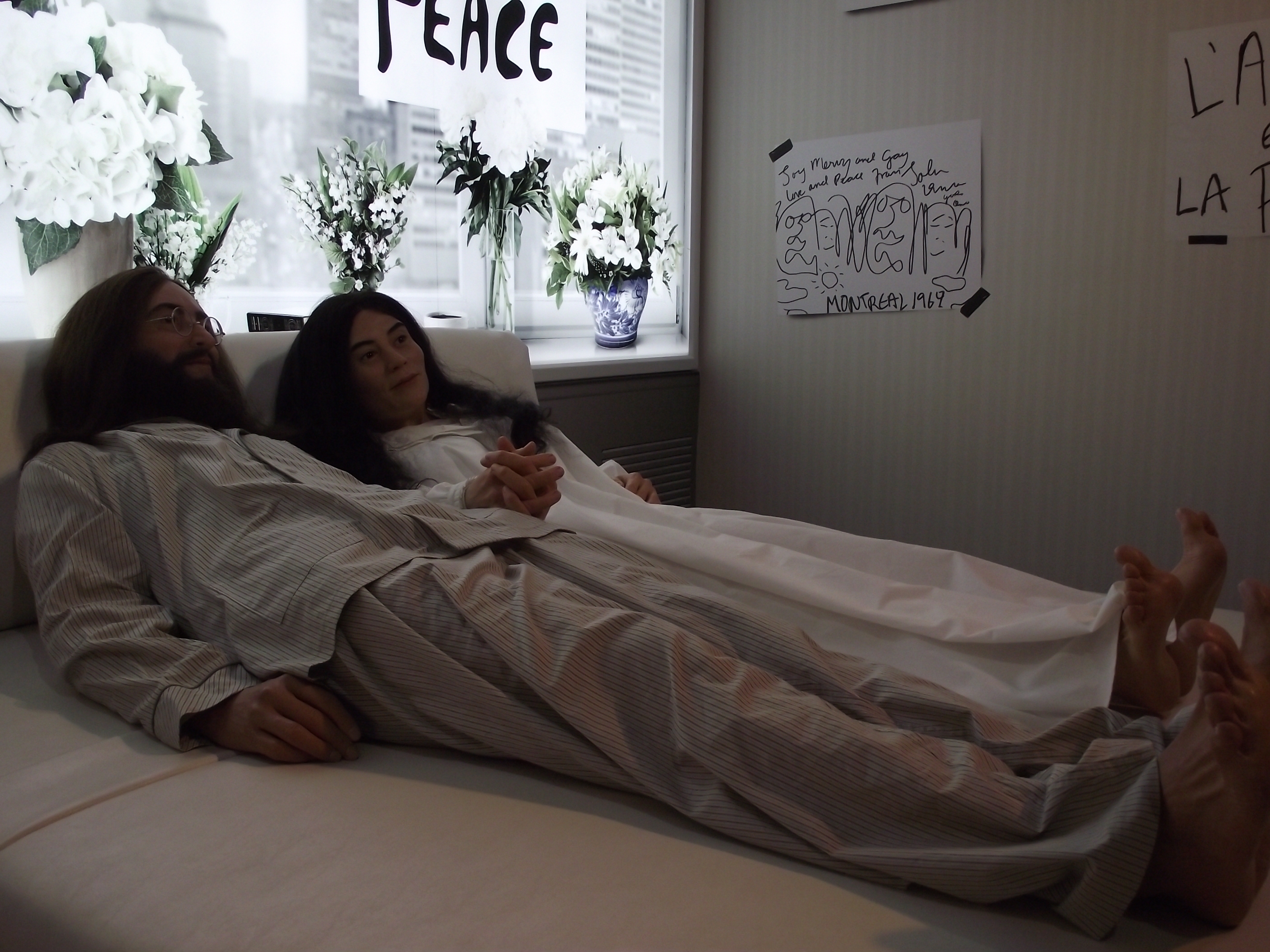
Montreal Bed-in with John Lennon and Yoko Ono

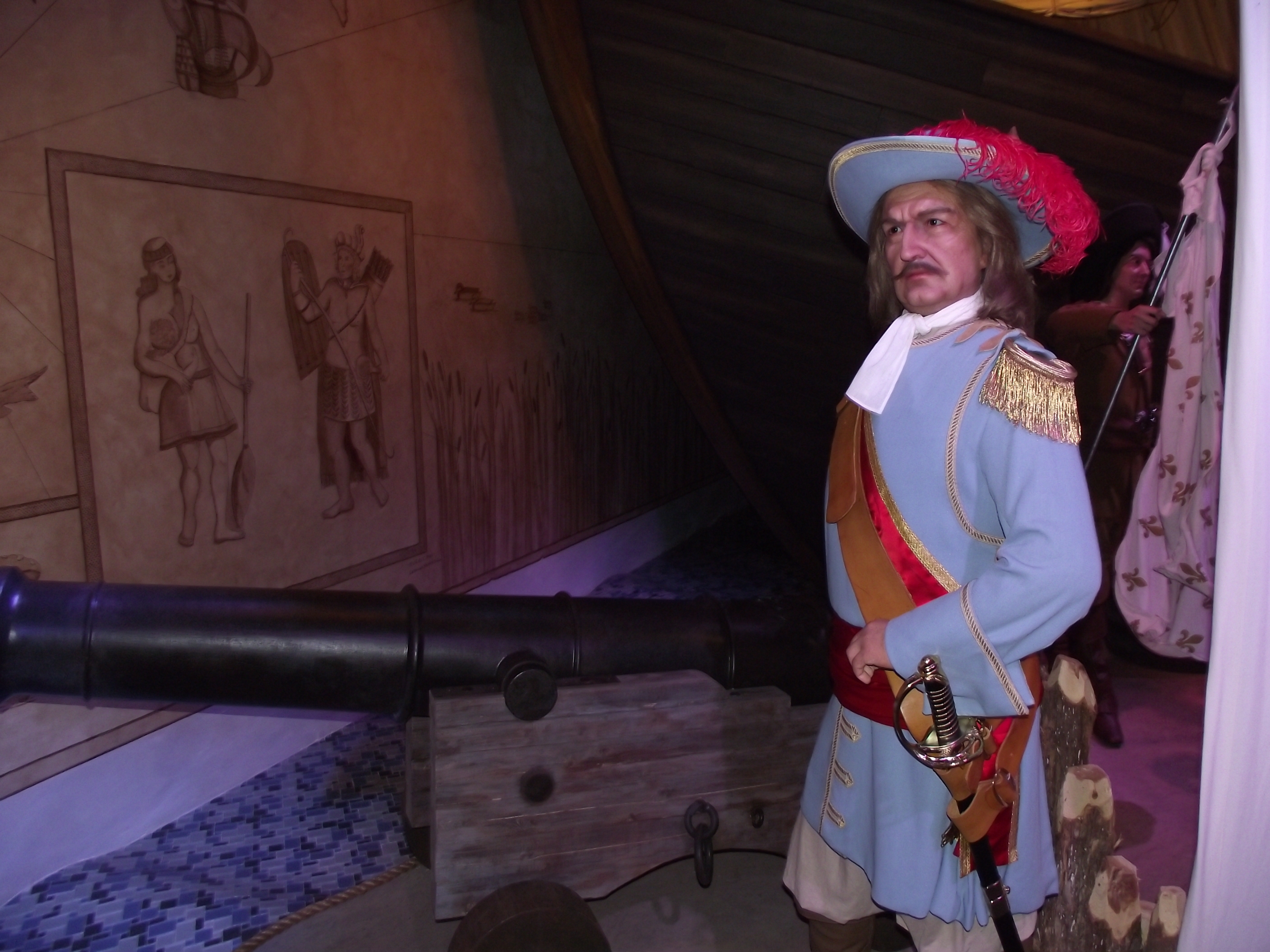
Louis de Buade de Frontenac

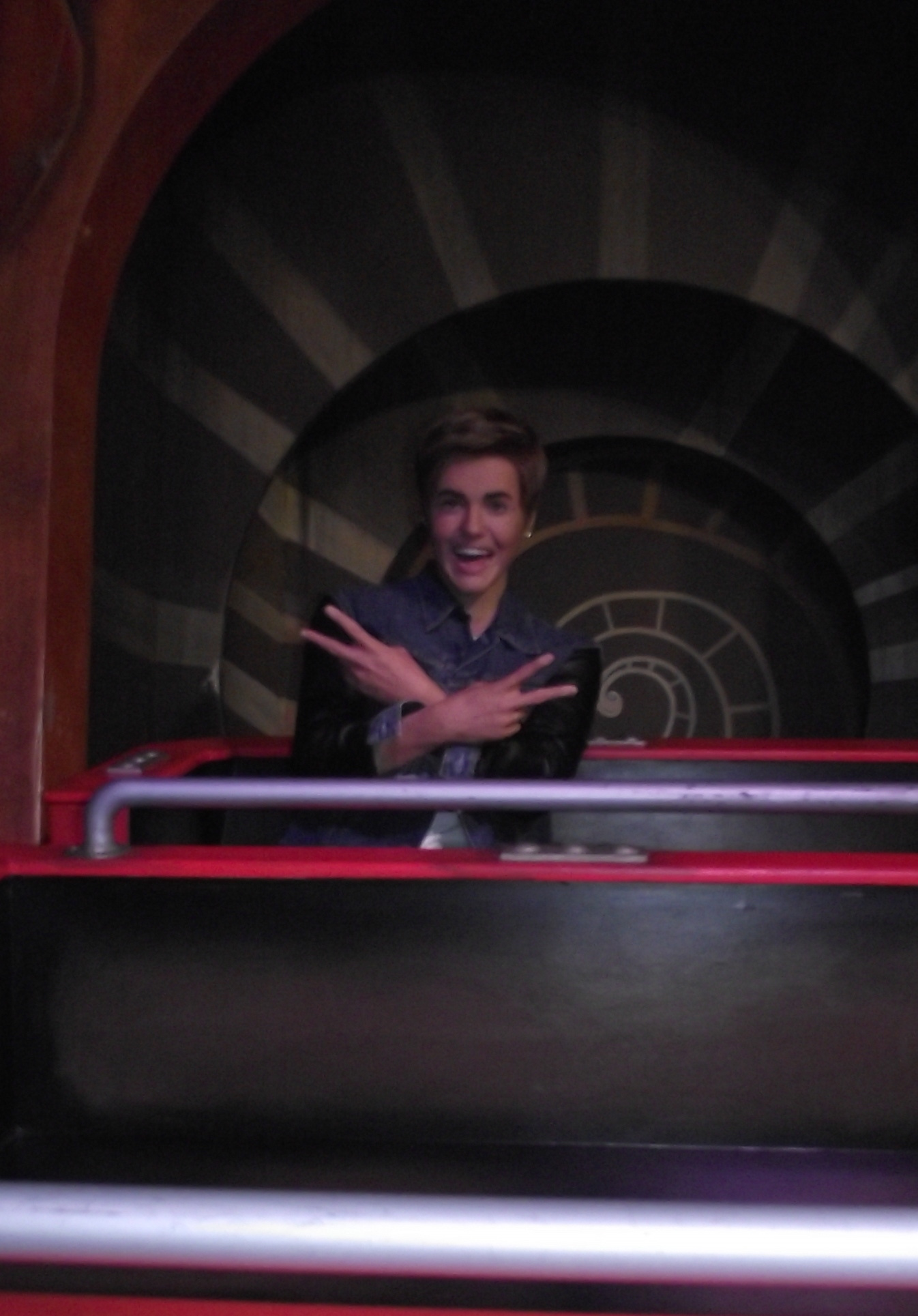
Justin Bieber

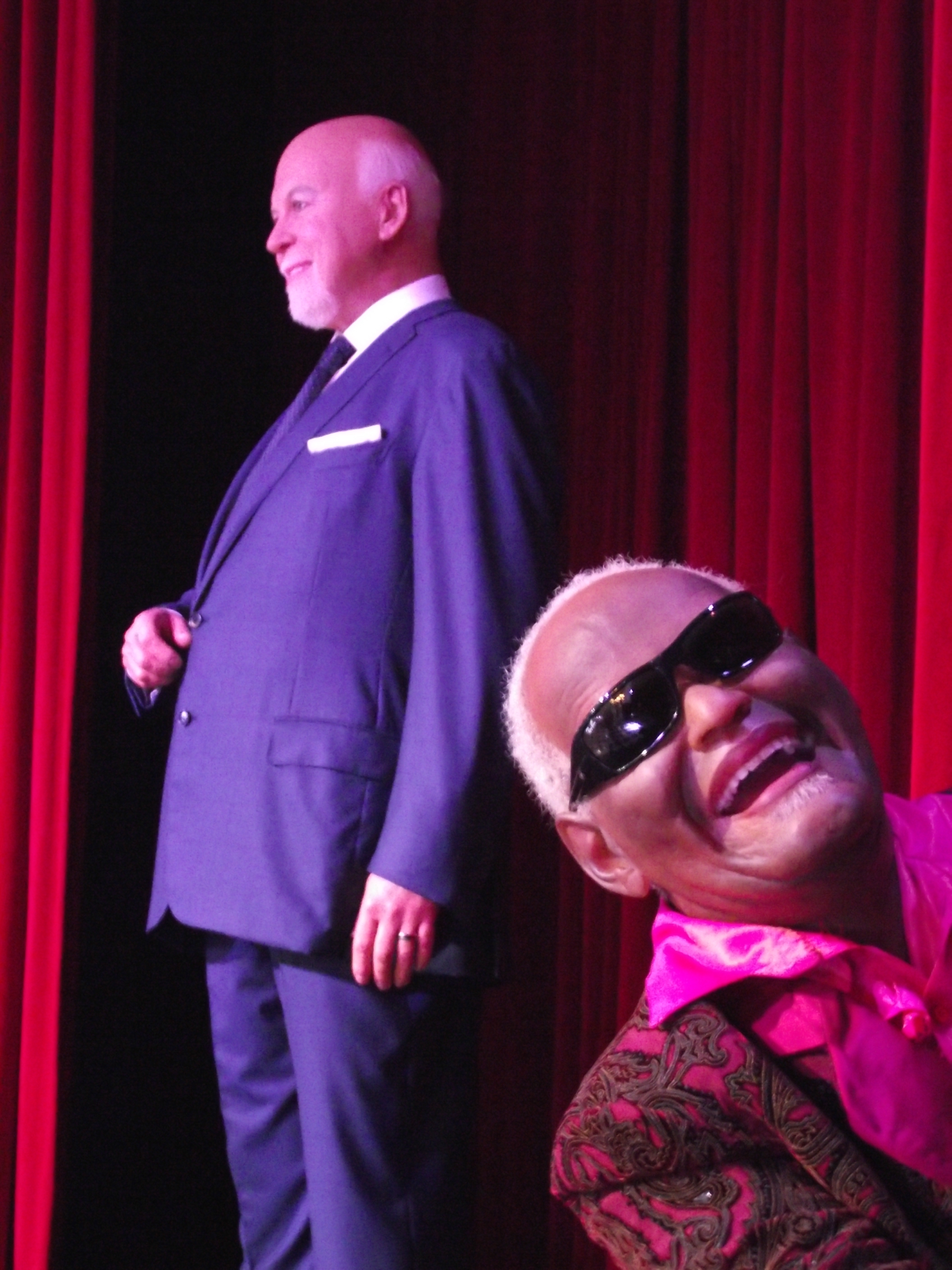
René Angélil and Ray Charles

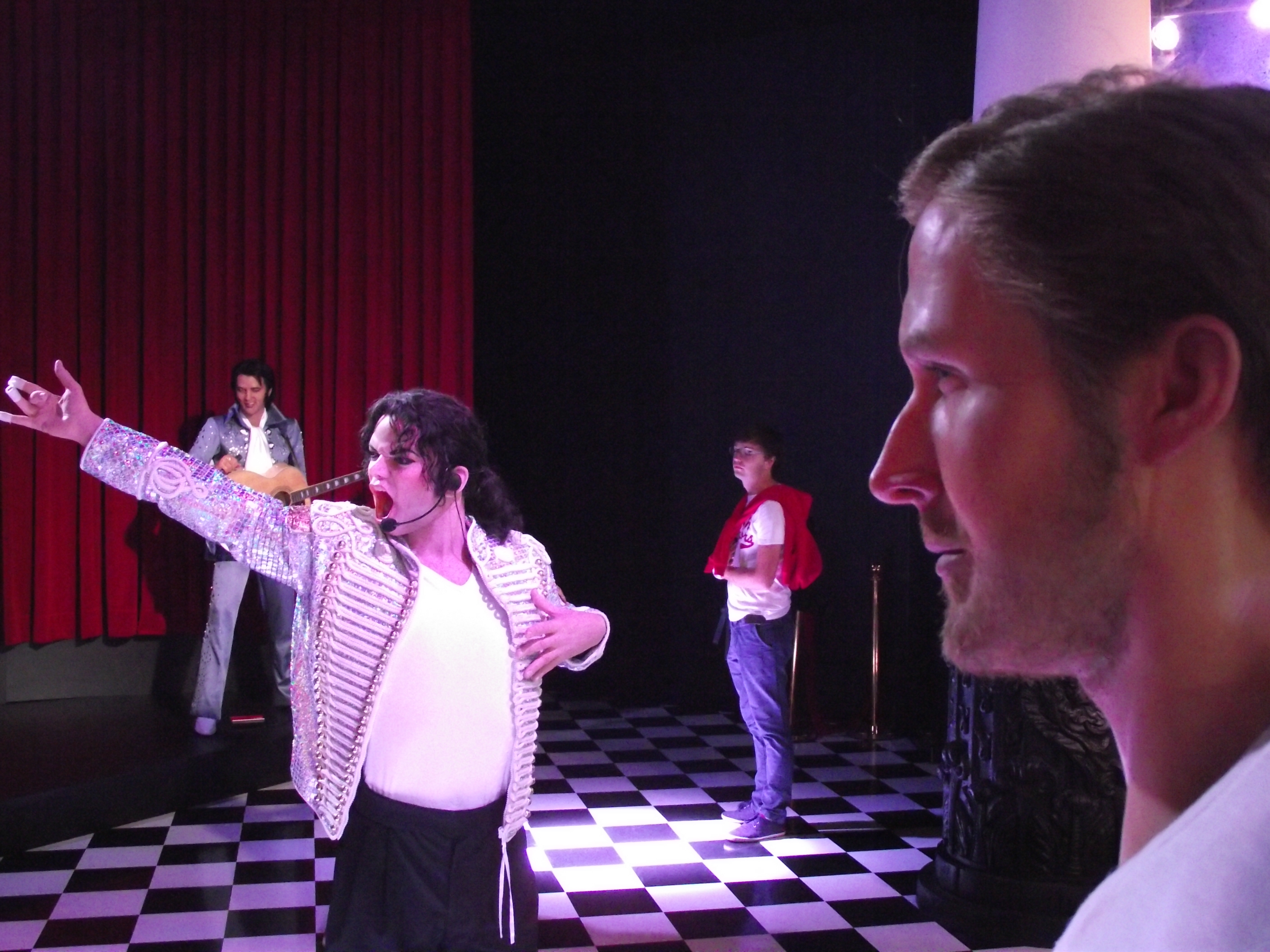
Michael Jackson and Ryan Gosling

== See also ==
- Musée Grévin
- List of museums in Quebec
