= Village Québécois d'Antan =

Historical village and living museum in Quebec, Canada

Coordinates: 45.8940°N 72.4893°W

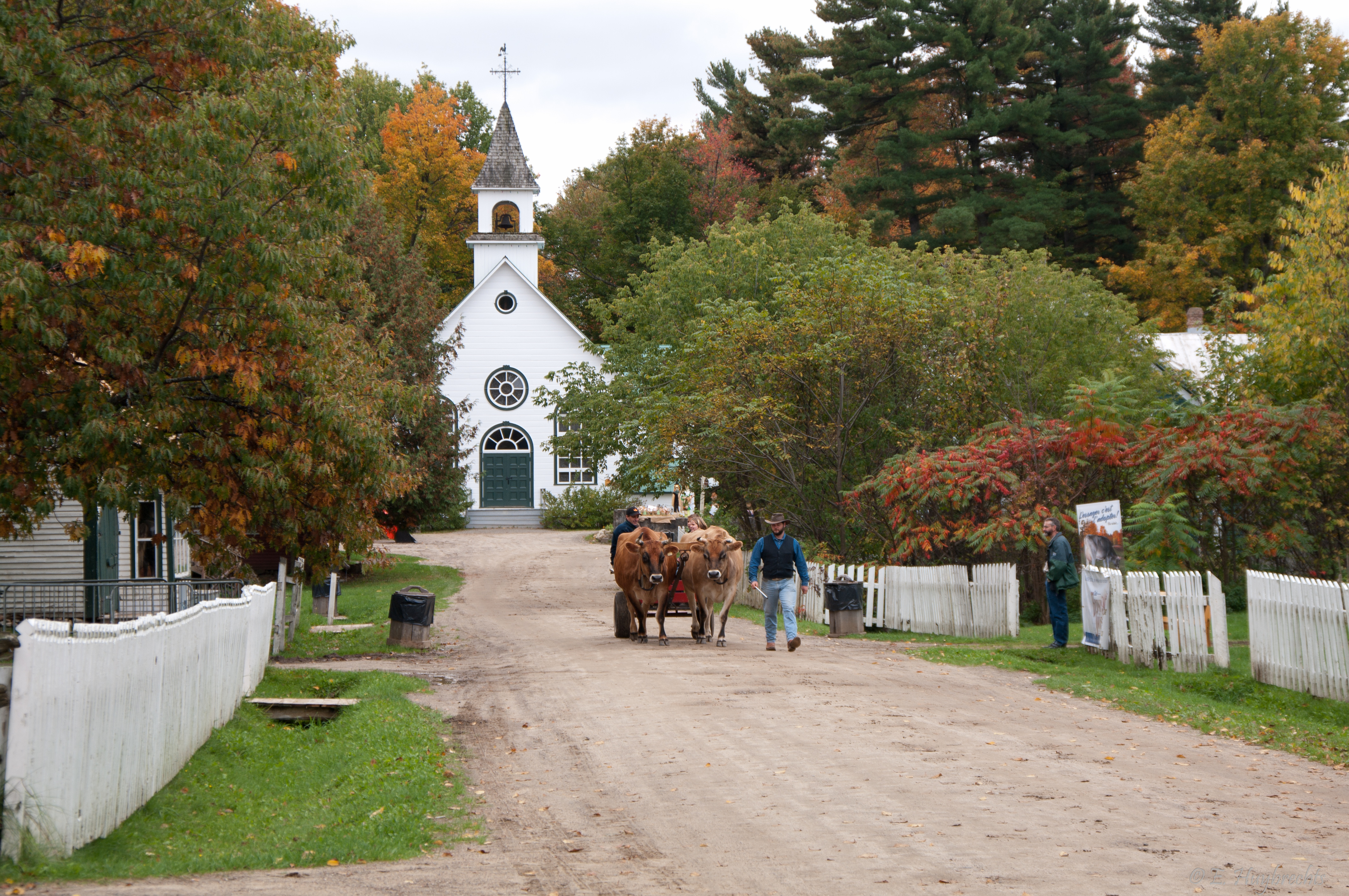
Village Québécois d'Antan

The site of the Village Québécois d'Antan is a historical village and living museum depicting life in Québec during the 19th century. The tourist attraction is located in Drummondville, Quebec, Canada.

The Village Québécois d'Antan was conceived in 1977 by historian Claude Verrier, by the Chamber of commerce of the county of Drummond.

== Details ==
The houses of the Village Québécois d'Antan are authentic houses of the 19th century, which were brought to the site, to create the village which reproduces the characteristics of the Québécois society between the years 1810 and 1930. On the site are:

- 70 houses of the 19th century (including a cabane à sucre, a school, the doctor's house, etc.)
- 22 homes have guides which are dressed as the people were in those days and which reproduce the activities of artisans
- 18 economuseums on traditional trades
- a 2.8 kilometres (1.7 mi) site situated within a natural landscape
- more than 100 employees on the site

== Holiday themes ==
The Village has annual events for certain major holidays:

- Le Village Hanté is the Halloween-themed version of the Village, which offers a haunted tour and takes place from late September through the end of October.
- Le Village Illuminé Desjardins is the Christmas-themed version of the Village, which involves Christmas food, shops, and lights, and lasts from late November through early January.
