= Sherbrooke Nature and Science Museum =

- Musée de la nature et des sciences de Sherbrooke
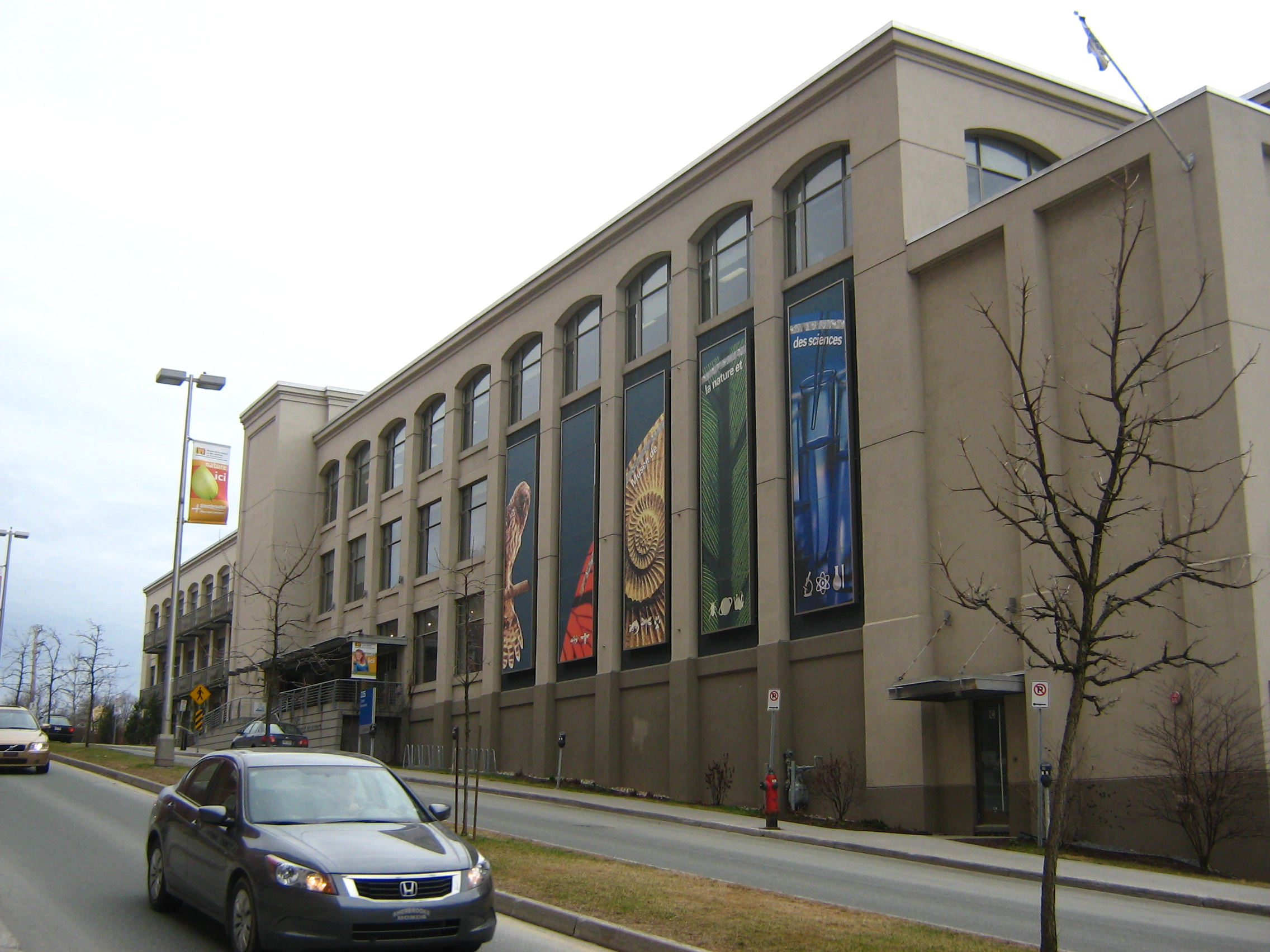
- The Sherbrooke Nature and Science Museum is located within a former factory
- Established: 2002
- Location: 225, rue Frontenac; Sherbrooke, Quebec; J1H 1K1
- Coordinates: 45.4034°N 71.8954°W
- Type: Natural history museum and Science museum
- Collection size: 65,000
- Visitors: 40,000 (2011)
- Director: Alex Martin
- President: Marie-Claude Lyonnais
- Curator: Serge Gauthier
- Website: mns2.ca

The Sherbrooke Nature and Science Museum (French: Musée de la nature et des sciences de Sherbrooke) is a natural history and science museum in Sherbrooke, Quebec, Canada. It is located at 225 Frontenac Street in downtown Sherbrooke.

The museum receives funding from the City of Sherbrooke, the Quebec Ministry of Culture and Communications, the Department of Canadian Heritage as well as sponsorships, special grants and private funding.

== History ==
In 1879, the Musée du Séminaire de Sherbrooke opened within the Séminaire de Sherbrooke on Marquette Street. The museum housed a collection of objects and specimens in the natural sciences. In the autumn of 2002 the museum began a major transformation, including its move to the Julius-Kayser Building, a 5,000 square metres (54,000 sq ft) former lingerie factory.

== Collection and exhibits ==
The museum's collection of over 65,000 objects and specimens represents the diversity of the fauna and flora of Quebec, Canada as well as elsewhere in North America and around the world. These items include, specimens of amphibians, reptiles and fish, archaeological items, 4,000 specimens of birds, 1,000 plant and animal fossils, 30,000 specimens of invertebrates, 500 specimens of mammals, 2,000 plants, 250 fungi, 4,000 rocks and minerals, as well as scientific instruments and other objects.

There is a permanent exhibition hall with an exhibit on the four seasons, as well as temporary exhibition halls, an interactive science theatre, a multi-functional hall, a relaxation area and a boutique.
