= Saint-Mathieu-du-Parc =

- Municipality
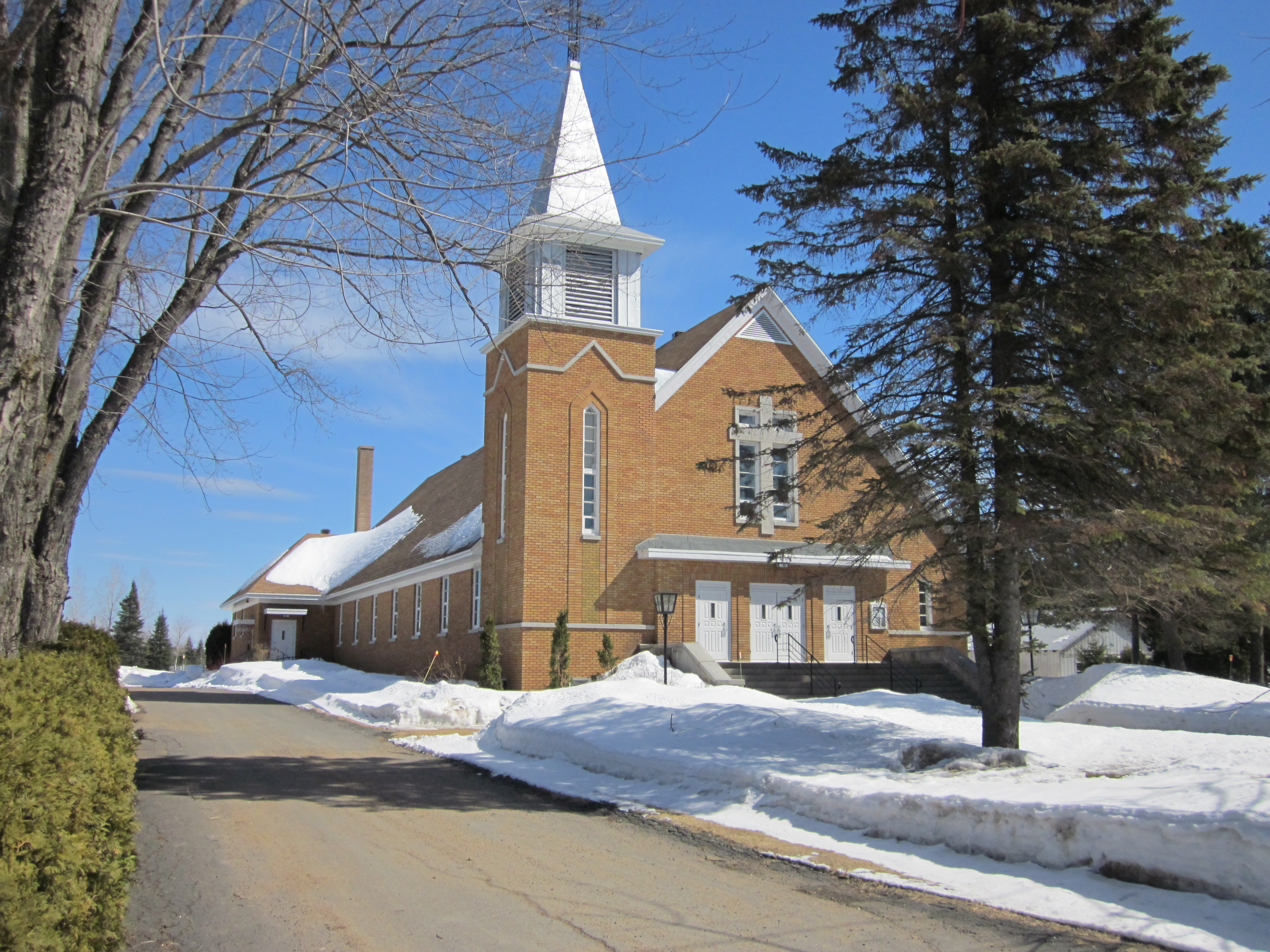
- Saint-Mathieu Church

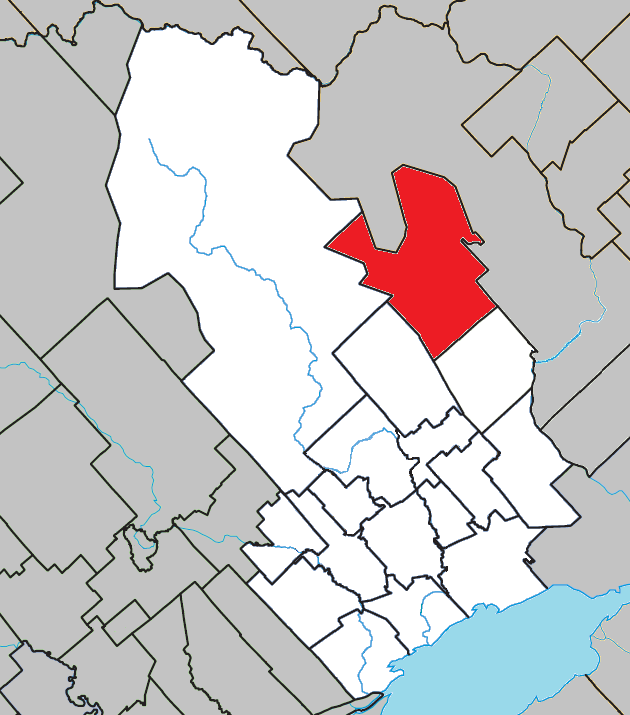
- Location within Maskinongé RCM

- Location in central Quebec
- Coordinates: 46°34′N 72°55′W
- Country: Canada
- Province: Quebec
- Region: Mauricie
- RCM: Maskinongé
- Settled: 1870s
- Constituted: June 30, 1886

Government
  - Mayor: Claude Mayrand
  - Fed. riding: Berthier—Maskinongé
  - Prov. riding: Saint-Maurice

Area
  - Total: 228.96 km^{2} (88.40 sq mi)
  - Land: 218.85 km^{2} (84.50 sq mi)

Population (2021)
  - Total: 1,482
  - Density: 6.8/km^{2} (18/sq mi)
  - Change 2016-21: ▲10.8%
  - Dwellings: 1,164
- Time zone: UTC−5 (EST)
  - Summer (DST): UTC−4 (EDT)
- Postal code(s): G0X 1N0
- Area code(s): 819
- Highways: R-351
- Website: www.saint-mathieu-du-parc.ca

Saint-Mathieu-du-Parc (French pronunciation: [sɛ̃ matjø dy paʁk]) is a municipality in the Mauricie region of the province of Quebec, Canada. Prior to March 28, 1998, it was known simply as Saint-Mathieu.

It is home to the Mokotakan Museum, showcasing the First Nations of Quebec, as well as Bicolline (a large LARP venue). It is also one of the main access points to La Mauricie National Park.

The municipality is bisected by the Shawinigan River and dotted with many lakes, such as Vert, Goulet, Bellemare, Trudel, and des Érables.

== History ==
Settlement of the area began in the second half of the 19th century, when 1 group settled along the Rivière des Souris and another near Lake Bellemare. In 1872, the Parish of Saint-Mathieu was formed, named in honour of Matthew the Apostle. In 1886, the Parish Municipality of Saint-Mathieu was established out of territory ceded by the Township de Shawenegan [sic]. It was sometimes also called Saint-Mathieu-de-Caxton (in reference to its location in the geographic township of Caxton) and Saint-Mathieu-du-Lac-Bellemare (referring to its location on Lake Bellemare). In 1891, its post office opened under the name Lac-Bellemare.

In 1980, the post office was renamed to Saint-Mathieu-du-Parc; the addition "du Parc" referring to La Mauricie National Park, whose eastern entrance is located within the municipality. On March 28, 1998, the Parish Municipality of Saint-Mathieu changed its status and name to become the Municipality of Saint-Mathieu-du-Parc.

On December 31, 2001, Saint-Mathieu-du-Parc was transferred from the Centre-de-la-Mauricie RCM to the Maskinongé RCM, following the formation of the new City of Shawinigan and the dissolution of the Centre-de-la-Mauricie RCM.

== Demographics ==
Historical census populations – Saint-Mathieu-du-Parc

Year	Pop.	±%
1871	130	—
1881	263	+102.3%
1891	233	−11.4%
1901	544	+133.5%
1911	770	+41.5%
1921	616	−20.0%
1931	561	−8.9%
1941	638	+13.7%

Year	Pop.	±%
1951	623	−2.4%
1956	524	−15.9%
1961	581	+10.9%
1966	590	+1.5%
1971	553	−6.3%
1976	673	+21.7%
1981	907	+34.8%
1986	944	+4.1%

Year	Pop.	±%
1991	1,073	+13.7%
1996	1,151	+7.3%
2001	1,266	+10.0%
2006	1,376	+8.7%
2011	1,407	+2.3%
2016	1,338	−4.9%
2021	1,482	+10.8%

Population counts are not adjusted for boundary changes.
Source: Statistics Canada

== Local government ==
List of former mayors:

- Daniel Petit (...–2005)
- André Berthiaume (2005–2009)
- Claude Mayrand (2009–2013, 2021–present)
- Claude McManus (2013–2017)
- Josée Magny (2017–2021)
