= List of museums in Montreal =

This is a list of museums in Montreal, in the province of Quebec, Canada. Also included are non-profit art galleries and university art galleries. Museums that exist only in cyberspace (i.e., virtual museums) are not included.

== List of museums ==
Name	Neighbourhood	Borough/City	Type	Summary
Artothèque de Montréal	La Petite-Patrie	Rosemont–La Petite-Patrie	Art	contemporary art
Bank of Montreal Museum	Old Montreal	Ville-Marie	Numismatic	history of the Bank of Montreal, coins
Bibliothèque et Archives nationales du Québec	Quartier Latin	Ville-Marie	Library	Changing exhibits of history and art from its collections
Black Watch (Royal Highland Regiment) of Canada Museum	Quartier des spectacles	Ville-Marie	Military	Regimental history and memorabilia
Canadian Aviation Heritage Centre	Macdonald Campus	Sainte-Anne-de-Bellevue	Aviation	Collection of aircraft and art about aviation
Canadian Centre for Architecture	Shaughnessy Village	Ville-Marie	Architecture	research centre and museum dedicated to architecture; offers rotating exhibits; building designed by Peter Rose opened in 1989; incorporates Shaughnessy House, an 1874 mansion
Canadian Guild of Crafts	Golden Square Mile	Ville-Marie	Art	collection and shop of Canadian fine crafts, Inuit and First Nations crafts and sculpture
Centre d'exposition de l'Université de Montréal	Côte-des-Neiges	Côte-des-Neiges–Notre-Dame-de-Grâce	Art	contemporary art gallery of the Université de Montréal
Centre d'histoire de Montréal	Old Montreal	Ville-Marie	History	City history
Centre Émilie-Gamelin	Bordeaux-Cartierville	Ahuntsic-Cartierville	Religious	located in Bordeaux-Cartierville, life of Roman Catholic nun Émilie Gamelin, and works and history of the Sisters of Providence religious community
Chapelle historique du Bon-Pasteur	Quartier Latin	Ville-Marie	Art	art exhibits
Dufresne-Nincheri Museum	Hochelaga-Maisonneuve	Mercier–Hochelaga-Maisonneuve	Historic house and artist's studio	1910s Beaux-Arts style mansion and Nincheri's studio
Château Ramezay - Musée et site historique de Montréal	Old Montreal	Ville-Marie	History	City history, 18th-century period life
Cinémathèque québécoise	Quartier Latin	Ville-Marie	Media	Film, television and photography exhibits
Cité historia, musée d'histoire du Sault-au-Récollet	Sault-au-Récollet	Ahuntsic-Cartierville	Historic house	18th-century historic house and mill; located in Sault-au-Récollet
Darling Foundry	Faubourg des Récollets	Ville-Marie	Art	visual arts centre
DHC/ART	Old Montreal	Ville-Marie	Art	contemporary art gallery
Dorval Museum of Local History and Heritage	Lakeshore, Dorval	Dorval	History	local history
Écomusée du fier monde	Gay Village	Montreal	History	Heritage of the industrial and working-class people of south-central Montreal
Ecomuseum Zoo	Macdonald Campus	Sainte-Anne-de-Bellevue	Zoo	Zoo home to live animals native to the Saint Lawrence River valley
Fur Trade at Lachine National Historic Site	Lakeshore, Lachine	Lachine	History	Montreal's fur industry
Galerie de l'UQAM	Quartier Latin	Ville-Marie	Art	contemporary art gallery
Gallery X	Quartier Concordia	Ville-Marie	Art	Contemporary art gallery of Concordia University
Lachine Canal National Historic Site	Lakeshore, Lachine	Lachine	Transport	Exhibits at the Lachine Visitor Services Centre about the history and heritage of the canal
Leonard & Bina Ellen Art Gallery	Quartier Concordia	Ville-Marie	Art	part of Concordia University
Musée des Illusions Montréal (Museum of Illusions Montreal)	Old Montreal	Vieux-Port - Old Port		
Maison de Mère d’Youville	Old Montreal	Ville-Marie	Religious	history of the Grey Nuns of Montreal and their founder, Saint Marie-Marguerite d'Youville
Maison Saint-Gabriel	Pointe-Saint-Charles	Le Sud-Ouest	Historic house	17th-century period house and gardens, also changing exhibits of decorative arts from its collections
Marguerite Bourgeoys Museum	Old Montreal	Ville-Marie	Religion	Historic chapel and history of the 17th-century woman who founded it, as well as the city's early religious settlers
McCord Museum	Downtown Montreal	Ville-Marie	Multiple	Montreal's history and culture, changing exhibits of culture, art and heritage
Montreal Biodôme	Espace pour la vie	Mercier–Hochelaga-Maisonneuve	Zoo	Replicas of four ecosystems, with animals and plants
Montreal Biosphère	Saint Helen's Island	Ville-Marie	Natural history	Ecology, the environment and sustainable living
Montreal Botanical Garden	Espace pour la vie	Rosemont–La Petite-Patrie	Botanical garden	Thematic gardens and greenhouses
Montreal Holocaust Memorial Centre	Côte-des-Neiges	Côte-des-Neiges–Notre-Dame-de-Grâce	History	Holocaust story and effects of bigotry and hate
Montreal Insectarium	Espace pour la vie	Mercier–Hochelaga-Maisonneuve	Natural history	Live insects and insect exhibits
Montreal Museum of Fine Arts	Golden Square Mile	Ville-Marie	Art	Collections include Canadian, Inuit, European, pre-Columbian, African, modern and contemporary art, ancient cultures, decorative arts, Greek and Roman sculptures
Planetarium	Espace pour la vie	Mercier–Hochelaga-Maisonneuve	Science	Planetarium
Montreal Science Centre	Old Port of Montreal	Ville-Marie	Science	Interactive science exhibits
Musée d'art contemporain de Montréal	Quartier des spectacles	Ville-Marie	Art	Contemporary art
Musée de la police de Montréal	Quartier des spectacles	Ville-Marie	Law enforcement	
Musée de Lachine	Lakeshore, Lachine	Lachine	Multiple	history exhibits in the 17th-century LeBer-LeMoyne House, sculpture garden, art exhibits; located in Lachine
Musée des Hospitalières de l'Hôtel-Dieu de Montréal	Pine Avenue	Le Plateau-Mont-Royal	Medical	history of the Hôtel-Dieu de Montréal, medicine and religious art
Musée de Paléontologie et de l'Evolution	???	???	Natural History, mostly Palaeontology	fossil life and geology of Canada
Musée des maîtres et artisans du Québec	Cégep de Saint-Laurent campus	Saint-Laurent	Art	contemporary craft and art
Musée des ondes Emile Berliner	Saint-Henri	Le Sud-Ouest	Technology	history and development of sound creation, production, reproduction, recording and broadcasting; includes gramophones, phonographs, radios, televisions, sound recording equipment, microphones, records and cylinders
Musée des pompiers de Montréal	Mile End	Le Plateau-Mont-Royal	Firefighting	
Musée des Sœurs de Miséricorde	Bordeaux-Cartierville	Ahuntsic-Cartierville	Religious	works of the Misericordia Sisters
Montreal Video Game Museum	Montreal	Montreal	Technology	history of video games with a focus on the Canadian contribution
Musée Eudore-Dubeau	Côte-des-Neiges	Côte-des-Neiges–Notre-Dame-de-Grâce	Medical	part of the University of Montreal, open by appointment, history of dentistry and its teaching in Quebec
Museum of Fashion	Old Montreal	Ville-Marie	Fashion	devoted to fashion, costume
Museum of the Saint Joseph's Oratory of Mount Royal	Côte-des-Neiges	Côte-des-Neiges–Notre-Dame-de-Grâce	Art	Features Christian art from Quebec and around the world
Peter B. Yeomans Cultural Centre	Lakeshore, Dorval	Dorval	Art	art exhibits
Pointe-à-Callière, Montreal Museum of Archaeology and History	Old Montreal	Ville-Marie	History	History and archaeology of the city, located in 6 buildings
Prison-des-Patriotes	Sainte-Marie	Ville-Marie	History	exhibition on the 1837-1838 rebellions in Lower Canada and the Patriote movement
Redpath Museum of Natural History	McGill University campus	Ville-Marie	Natural history	Part of McGill University
Royal Canadian Ordnance Corps Museum	CFB Montreal	Mercier–Hochelaga-Maisonneuve	Military	regimental history and memorabilia, located in the garrison in Longue-Pointe
Royal Montreal Regiment Museum	Lower Westmount	Westmount	Military	regimental history and memorabilia of The Royal Montreal Regiment
SBC Gallery of Contemporary Art	Quartier des spectacles	Ville-Marie	Art	contemporary art
Sir George-Étienne Cartier National Historic Site	Old Montreal	Ville-Marie	Historic house	19th-century Victorian period house and life of Sir George-Étienne Cartier
Sisters of Saint Anne Historic Centre	Lakeshore, Lachine	Lachine	Religious	closed in 2014, history of the convent and its founder
Stewart Hall Art Gallery	Lakeshore, Pointe-Claire	Pointe-Claire, Quebec	Art	

== Defunct museums ==
- Stewart Museum, 1955-2021, collection to be merged with McCord Museum (former website)
- Just for Laughs Museum, closed in 2010
- Musée Marc-Aurèle Fortin, closed in 2007, collection now at the Montreal Museum of Fine Arts
- Musee historique canadien, 1935-1989, wax museum about Canadian history,
- Musée Grévin Montreal, wax museum, closed in 2021
- Sisters of Saint Anne Historic Centre, closed in 2014
- Montreal Fashion Museum, closed in 2018, collection now at the McCord Museum
- Telecommunication Museum in Lachine, closed in 2019
- Printmaking Museum, Lovell Building, closed its original historic site, relocated in 2016 to Collège Ahunsic
- Museum of the Miséricordia Sisters, closed in 2020

== Montreal Museums Day ==
Montreal Museums Day (French: Journée des musées montréalais) is an annual event in Montreal. One Sunday every May, more than 30 of the city's largest museums and galleries offer free admission and extended opening hours. To facilitate visitor access to as many museums as possible, the Montreal Transit Corporation provides free shuttle buses.

The first Montreal Museums Day was held in 1987.
