= Abitibi-Témiscamingue =

- Administrative region
- Coordinates: 48°14′N 79°01′W
- Country: Canada
- Province: Quebec
- Regional County Municipalities (RCM) and Equivalent Territories (ET): 4 RCM, 1 ET: Abitibi; Abitibi-Ouest; La Vallée-de-l'Or; Témiscamingue; Rouyn-Noranda (ET)

Area
  - Land: 57,325.74 km^{2} (22,133.59 sq mi)

Population (2021)
  - Total: 147,082
  - Density: 2.6/km^{2} (6.7/sq mi)
- Time zone: UTC-5 (EST)
  - Summer (DST): UTC-4 (EDT)
- Postal code: J
- Area code: 819, 873
- Website: abitibi-temiscamingue.org

Abitibi-Témiscamingue (French pronunciation: [abitibi temiskamɛ̃ɡ]) is an administrative region located in western Québec, Canada, along the border with Ontario. It became part of the province in 1898. It has a land area of 57,736.50 square kilometres (22,292.19 sq mi) and its population was 147,082 people as of the 2021 census. The region is divided into five regional county municipalities (French: municipalité régionale de comté, or MRC) and 79 municipalities. Its economy continues to be dominated by resource extraction industries. These include logging and mining all along the rich geologic Cadillac Fault between Val-d'Or and Rouyn-Noranda, as well as agriculture.

== History ==
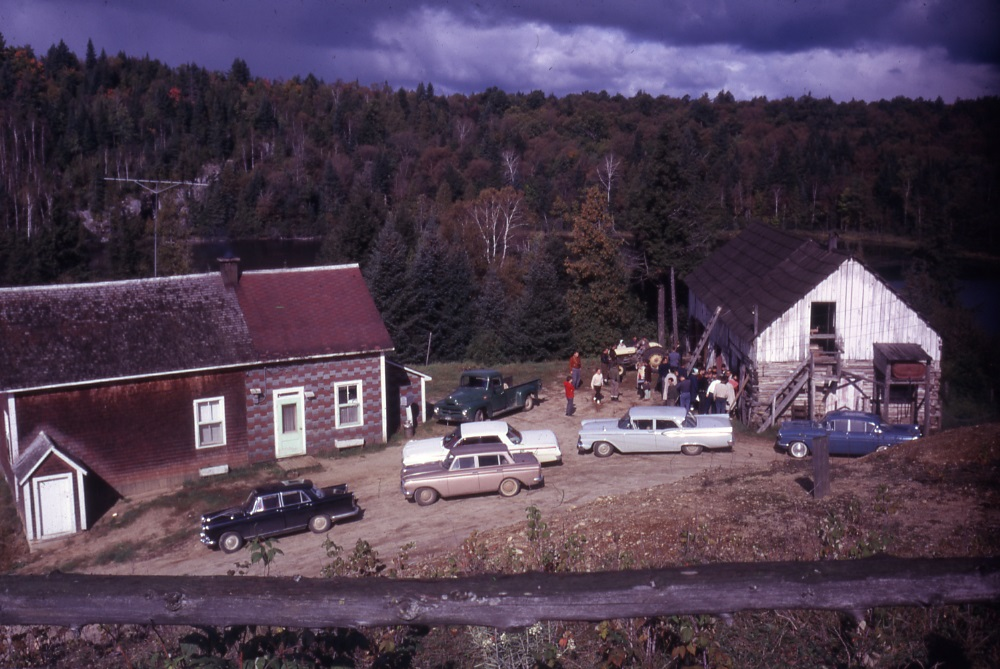
Farm in Abitibi-Témiscamingue in 1962

The Algonquins are indigenous to the region. The first French expeditions were made in 1670 by Radisson as part of the development of the fur trade industry across the Hudson Bay region and through most of the New France colony. Fort Témiscamingue, located on the east banks of Lake Timiskaming and erected by a French merchant on Anishinaabe lands in 1720, was an important crossroads of the fur trade along the Hudson Bay trading route.

Until 1868, Abitibi was owned by the Hudson's Bay Company; it was then purchased by Canada and became part of the North-West Territories. After negotiations with the federal government of Sir Wilfrid Laurier, Abitibi was annexed to the province of Quebec on June 13, 1898, by a federal decree. For its part, Témiscamingue had been part of Lower Canada and so was already part of Quebec at Confederation.

The region started to develop during the late 19th and early 20th century, with the development of agriculture and forest industries. This began in the southern areas, leading to the foundation of Ville-Marie in 1886 and Témiscaming in 1918. However, the greatest wave of colonization occurred between World War I and World War II when a large population came from urban centres due to the effects of the Great Depression. In the 1930s, federal and provincial plans such as the Plan Vautrin and the Plan Gordon incited jobless residents to move to undeveloped regions of the province, igniting the beginning of the second colonization flow.

The first migration flow brought people to the northern part of the region along the National Transcontinental Railway, leading to the establishment of towns such as La Sarre in 1917 and Amos in 1914, as well as other infrastructure as the internment camp at Spirit Lake for so-called enemy aliens arrested under the War Measures Act during World War I.

The mining industry, mainly extracting gold and copper, also contributed to the growth of the region when numerous mines were opened. New cities were created, such as Rouyn-Noranda in 1926 and Val-d'Or in 1934, and mining is still the backbone of the region's economy nowadays, along with forestry and agriculture.

As an administrative region, it was created in March 1966, when the entire province was reorganized into 10 regions. Originally called Nord-Ouest (North-West), the region was renamed to Abitibi-Témiscamingue in 1981.

== Geography ==
The Abitibi-Témiscamingue region is the fourth largest region of the province after the Nord-du-Québec, Côte-Nord and Saguenay–Lac-Saint-Jean regions. It has a total area of 65,000 km^{2}. Its largest cities are Rouyn-Noranda and Val-d'Or.

The region's landscape features mixed forest to the south across the Témiscamingue area which falls within the St. Laurence watershed of southern Quebec, while boreal forest covers the Abitibi section further north in the Hudson Bay watershed of northern Quebec.

The southern part of the region has a humid continental climate, while the northern part has more of a sub-arctic climate due to its latitude and its proximity to Hudson Bay and the Arctic.

=== Administrative divisions ===
==== Regional county municipalities ====
- Abitibi
- Abitibi-Ouest
- La Vallée-de-l'Or
- Témiscamingue

==== Equivalent territory ====
- Rouyn-Noranda

==== Indian reserves ====
- Kebaowek
- Lac-Simon
- Pikogan
- Timiskaming

==== Indian settlements ====
- Hunter's Point
- Kitcisakik
- Winneway

=== Major communities ===
- Amos
- Barraute
- La Sarre
- Lac-Simon
- Lorrainville
- Macamic
- Malartic
- Palmarolle
- Rivière-Héva
- Rouyn-Noranda
- Senneterre
- Témiscaming
- Val-d'Or
- Ville-Marie

== Demographics ==
Canada census – Abitibi-Témiscamingue community profile

	2021	2016
Population	147,082 (+0.2% from 2016)	146,717 (+0.7% from 2011)
Land area	57,325.74 km^{2} (22,133.59 sq mi)	57,736.50 km^{2} (22,292.19 sq mi)
Population density	2.6/km^{2} (6.7/sq mi)	2.5/km^{2} (6.5/sq mi)
Median age	44.0 (M: 43.2, F: 44.4)	43.4 (M: 42.5, F: 44.3)
Private dwellings	72,505 (total) 66,421 (occupied)	71,211 (total) 64,575 (occupied)
Median household income	$73,000	$61,273

References: 2021 2016

The 2013 statistics for the region show the following:

- Population: 147,931
- Area: 57,349 km^{2}
- Population Density: 2.6 per km^{2}
- Birth Rate: 9.2% (2004)
- Death Rate: 7.5% (2003)

Historical census populations – Abitibi-Témiscamingue
Year	Pop.	±%
2006	143,872	—
2011	145,690	+1.3%
2016	146,717	+0.7%
2021	147,082	+0.2%
Source: Statistics Canada

=== Languages ===
The following languages predominate as the primary language spoken at home:

- French, 94.8%
- English, 3.6%
- Algonquin, 1.6%

== National park ==
Aiguebelle National Park, the only national park of the region, is located in the centre of the Abitibian region and intends to protect natural heritage.

== Economy ==
The region's workforce has one of the highest percentages in the primary sector of any region of Quebec, with nearly one out of six employees working in that sector. The mining sector is the most important economic activity of the region. Despite recent declines in workforce, the agriculture and forest industries still contribute significantly to the region's economy. Economic activities are mainly dedicated to exportation products, and are even closely linked to the Middle North region in its development through hydroelectrical and mining projects, and through exchanges with First Nation northern communities.

Sportive tourism, including winter sports, fishing, hunting and cycling competition, is also a significant economic sector even if negligible by comparison with the industrial sector.

== Colleges and universities ==
=== University ===
The region is home to one university: UQAT — the Université du Québec en Abitibi-Témiscamingue, which is part of the Quebec public university network. UQAT has its main campus at Rouyn-Noranda, a campus dedicated to the first nations at Val-d'Or and several branches in different cities of the region.

=== College ===
The only college in the region is the Cégep de l'Abitibi-Témiscamingue, which has campuses in Amos, Rouyn-Noranda and Val-d'Or, and centres for continuing education in Ville-Marie and La Sarre.

== Architecture and urban planning ==
Because of its history and its development, the regional urban planning and the architectural landscape is quite rich in contrasts, showing two main typologies of development.

=== Rural and agricultural settlement ===
The agricultural development of northern Abitibi and the northern part of Témiscamingue by a relatively homogeneous population of French Canadian Catholic settlers has introduced a mainly rural land development. There, small towns, gravitating around a low density node generally composed of a wooden Roman Catholic church, an elementary school and few houses spread over the territory, according to an orthogonal division on the land, with rectangular parcels. Those small towns are gravitating themselves around a larger city, as La Sarre, Amos, Macamic and Ville-Marie, where major institutions are established. If small towns might seem more or less vernacular, major cities are often more planned and influenced by British urban planning, with sometime an orthogonal grid with lane network.

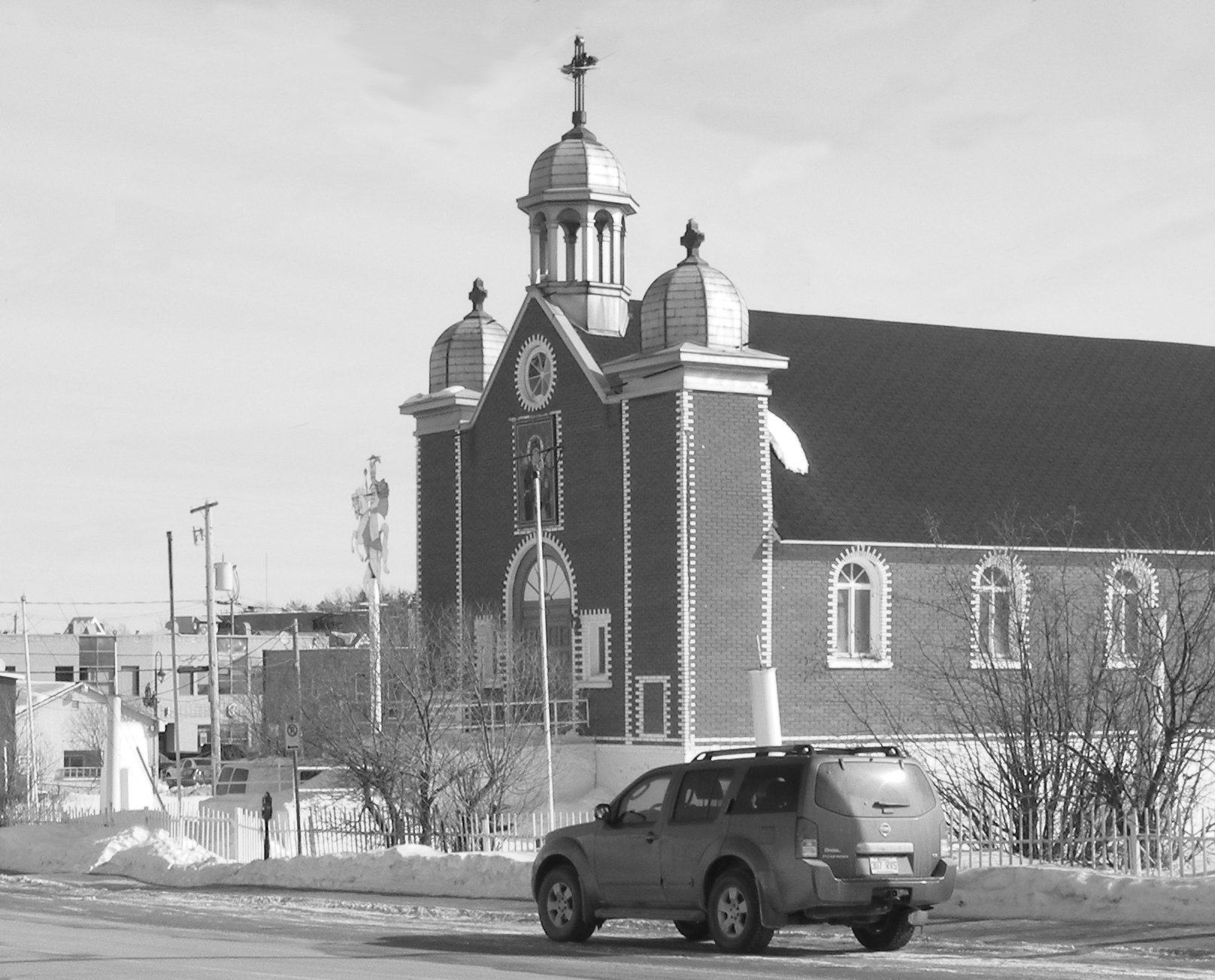
Ukrainian church in Val-d'Or

Because of their central location, main architectural elements are also on those cities. For instance, the Cathedral of Sainte-Thérèse d'Avila in Amos is one of the most outstanding architectural element of the region by its size and its Romano-Byzantine style, standing on the upper part of the city, and being at a symbolic central location of the region. However, if the cityscapes are often more various, the rural landscape features more local particularities. The wooden farms and barns built according to many vernacular forms, the fieldstone churches and the wooden houses with locally so-called “Canadian Roof” (steep roof ending with long curved overhang covering a front balcony) are widespread.

=== Boomtowns and industrial cities ===
The cities of Southern Abitibi and the city of Témiscaming were established later and for industrial concerns, and follow a quite different organization. As they grew up often very quickly, the urban planning of these industrial cities is often eclectic. The initial boroughs of Val-d’Or and Rouyn-Noranda, for instance, are both built according to two different schemes; an industrial and planned borough built and planned by the mine, and a “boomtown” borough built suddenly with minimal planning for the thousands of people who arrived attracted by the effervescence of the gold rush. Bourlamaque mining village is a remarkable example of a borough planned by the mine still visible today in Val-d'Or, with its log houses for workers orderly settled between the mine and the commercial streets, this, at a glace from the foremen’s houses and the hospital.

Noranda was also built according to that scheme, however, the other great example of an industrial town is Témiscaming. The Témiscaming Garden City plan, designed by Scottish architect Thomas Adams (1871–1940) is a rare example in Quebec of a mono-industrial city where a company planned and endeavoured to grant comfort of its workers. There, the dwellings, and even the plan, which follows the shape of the hill, was not alone to grant this comfort, elements as Italian renaissance fountain, landscaping were also included into the cityscape.

Those cities, and many other industrial cities of that part of the region, contrast with the rest of the region, and even generally with the other country regions of Quebec. As the mining industry was mainly led by owners coming from the anglosphere in the early 20th century, industrial towns even show more similarities with Ontarian industrial cities than other cities in Quebec. Added to North American modernity concerns of the 1930s and 1940s, streets are broader and often have numbered names, blocks are orthogonally organized with lanes where boomtown buildings with their peculiar facades are aligned along the main streets while residential buildings take place nearby. Many mining cities disappeared or have decreased since, but their industrial core often keep being seenable today. Duparquet and Cadillac, for example, have kept their boomtown appearance, through their street organization, even if the industrial and population exodus gave them a look of oversized village.

Moreover, the multi-cultural settlement of those towns brought many singular architectural elements. The Russian Orthodox and Catholic Ukrainian churches in Val-d’Or and Rouyn add to the omnipresent architecture. Nowadays, confronted with urban sprawl, those cities tend to develop in a very low density and functionalistic way, as other Quebec and North American cities. Some great buildings dominate the architectural landscape, as the Rouyn-Noranda campus of the Université du Québec, which could be seen by many aspects as an instrumental element of contemporary architecture of the region.

== Sports ==
The region hosts the yearly Tour de l'Abitibi, which first took place in 1969, and which is still the only North American stopover point of the Union Cycliste Internationale Junior World Cup. Abitibi-Témiscamingue also hosts a long segment of the Route Verte, the most extensive bicycle and multipurpose recreational trail in North America.

No professional league sports teams are based in Abitibi. It is home to two Quebec Major Junior Hockey League teams: the Val-d'Or Foreurs and the Rouyn-Noranda Huskies.

== See also ==
- Cité de l'Or - gold mine museum
- North American Palladium
