= Mokotakan =

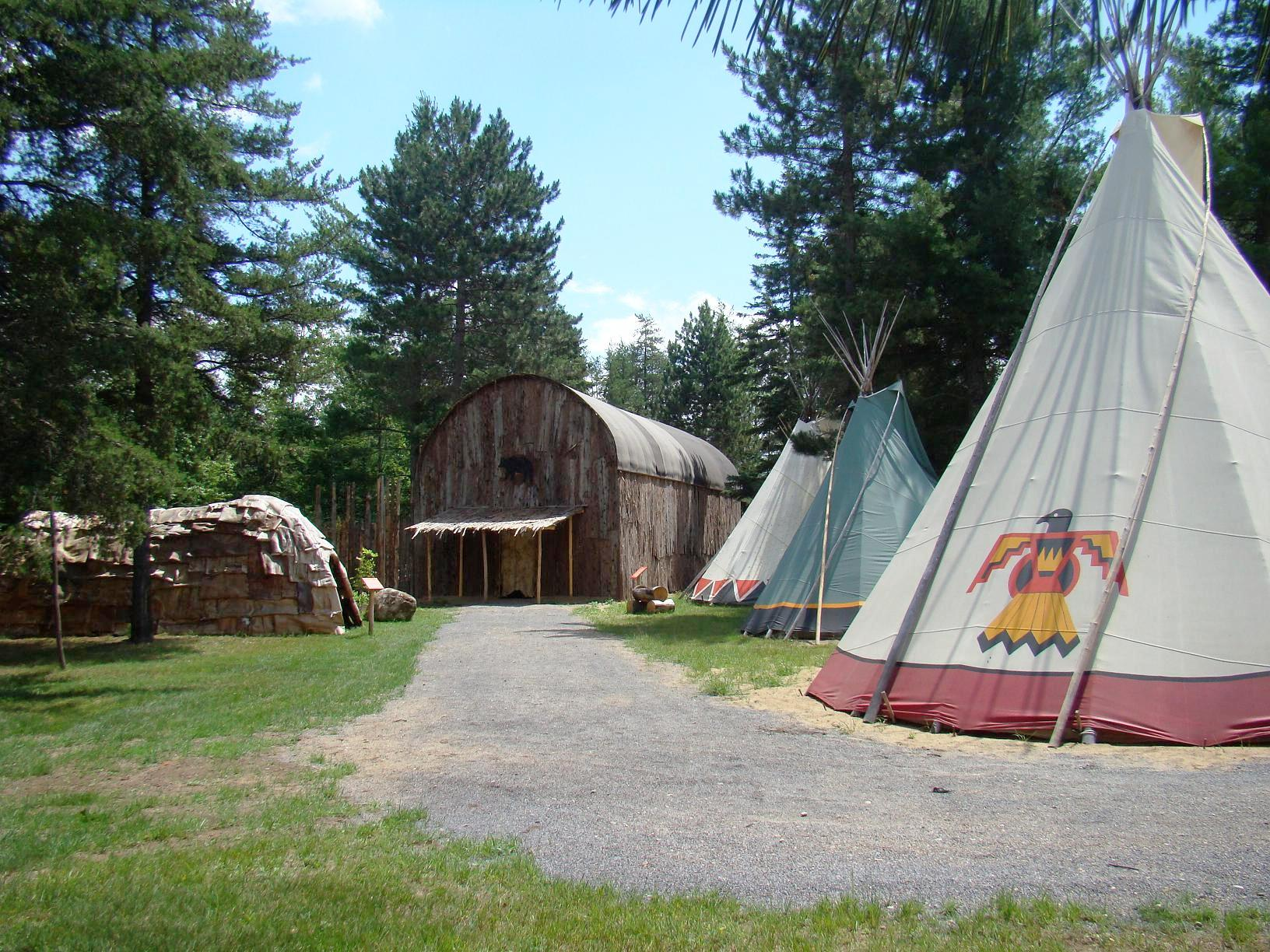
- Location: Saint-Mathieu-du-Parc, Quebec, Canada
- Coordinates: 46.652697°N 72.977564°W
- Type: open-air museum
- Website: www.mokotakan.com

Mokotakan is an open-air museum located in Saint-Mathieu-du-Parc in the Mauricie region of Quebec, Canada. It traces the presence of aboriginal peoples in Quebec for more than 5000 years. The eleven aboriginal peoples of Quebec represented at the site are Abenakis, Algonquins, Atikamekws, Cree, Wendat, Innu (Montagnais), Inuit, Wolastoqiyik, Micmac, Mohawk, Naskapis. The interpretive village was constructed based on various buildings recovered from various sites from the eleven nations.

The mission of this site is the sharing, dissemination and interpretation of culture of indigenous peoples of the Americas, with emphasis on the eleven nations of Quebec. A guided tour teaches visitors lifestyles, culture, history and spirituality of these peoples.

Mōkotākan means "crooked knife" in Atikamekw, an indispensable tool of the eleven nations of Quebec.

== Image gallery ==
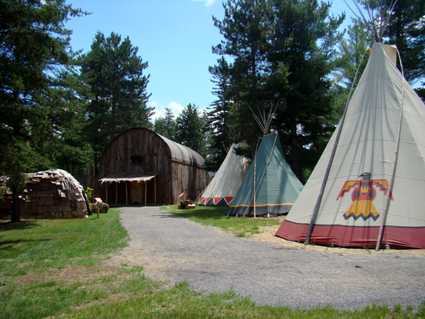
Mokotakan village scene

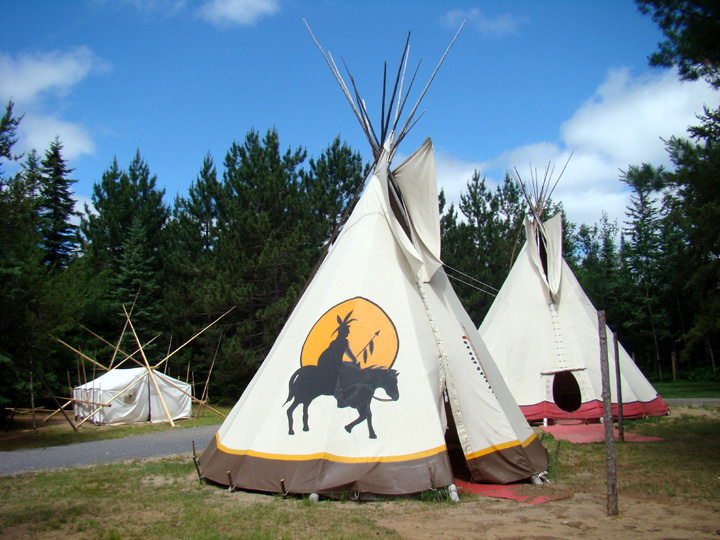
Mokotakan village scene

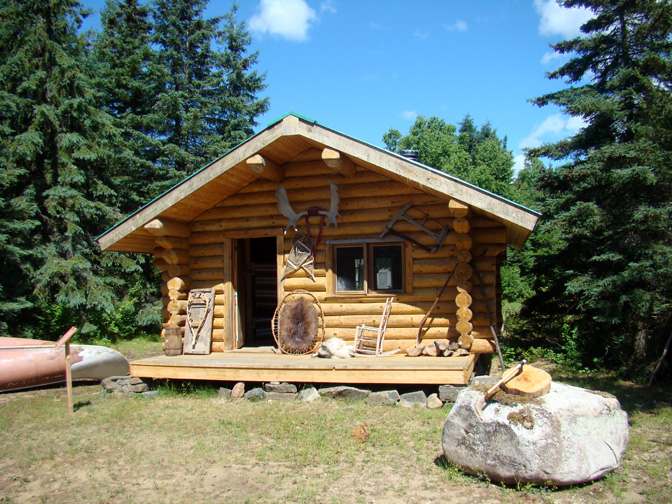
Mokotakan village scene

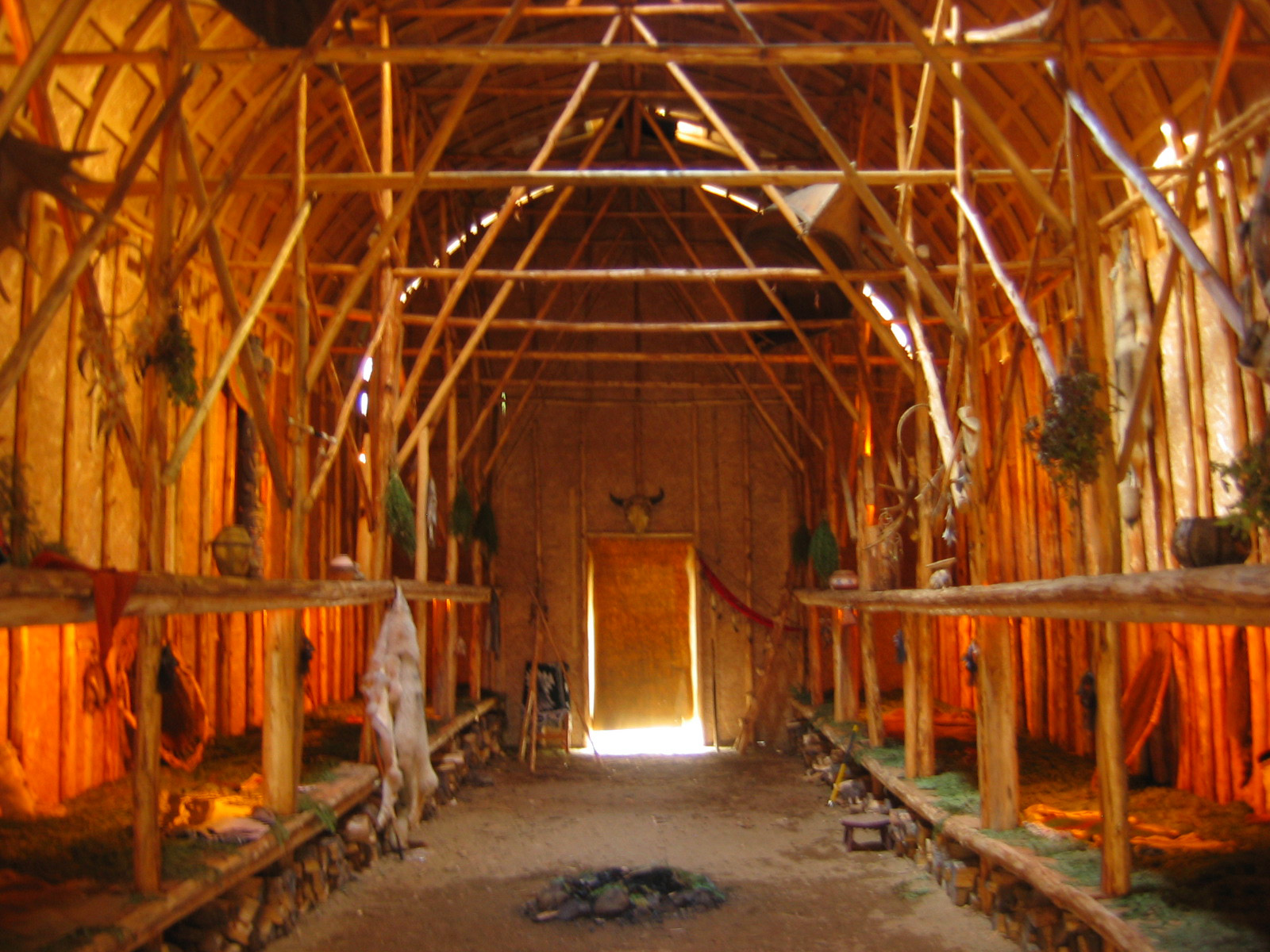
Mokotakan village scene

== Affiliations ==
The Museum is affiliated with: CMA, CHIN, and Virtual Museum of Canada.

== See also ==
- Aboriginal peoples in Quebec
- First Nations
