= Economuseum =

An economuseum or économusée is small-scale production of goods in a workshop environment focusing on the preservation and perpetuation of traditional skills and craftsmanship. The function of the economuseum is to promote the products of local craftspeople, create employment and in the end, promote immaterial, cultural heritage.

Shop owners provide the visiting public with information on techniques, skills, and production processes. In addition to products for sale, all economuseums have developed educational information material: historic product exhibits, present-day production samples and archive material.

== Concept ==
The concept of the 'économusée' was born in 1992 in Quebec, Canada, and is a registered trademark of the International Economuseum Network Society.

== Impact ==
A study of the économusée model in British Columbia found evidence of success among several participating sites, including increases in visitors and in performance, suggesting that the model may contribute to building sustainability in artisan businesses.
