= Jaune River (Saint-Charles River tributary) =

River in Capitale-Nationale (Québec, Canada)

Jaune river
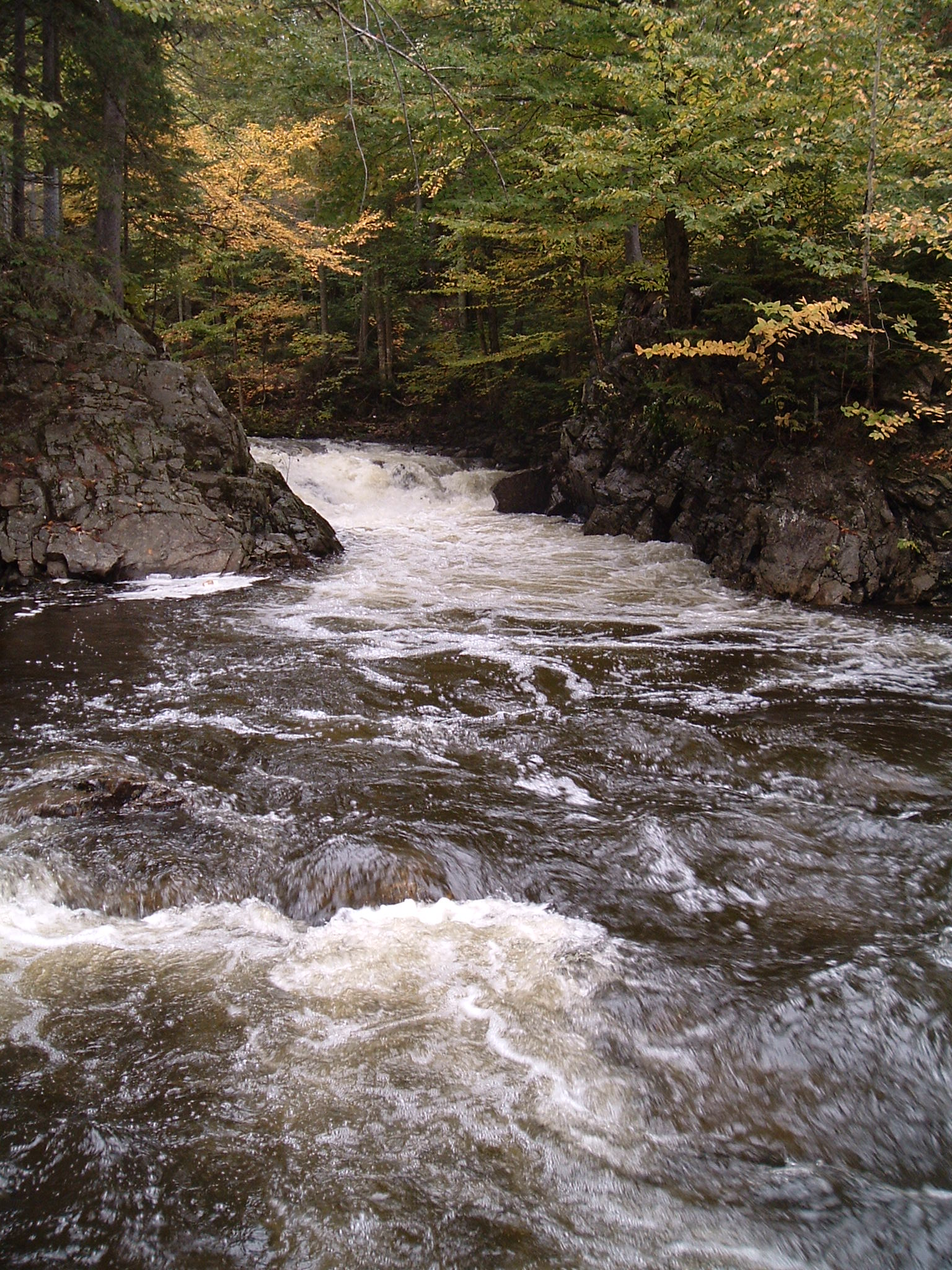
- The "rivière Jaune" in Lac-Beauport

- Location of the mouth of the river in Quebec City
- Native name: Rivière Jaune (French)

Location
- Country: Canada
- Province: Quebec
- Region: Capitale-Nationale
- Cities: Lac-Beauport and Quebec City (sector Lac-Saint-Charles

Physical characteristics
- Source: Confluence of two mountain streams
  - location: Lac-Beauport
  - coordinates: 47.039008°N 71.263858°W
  - elevation: 388 m
- Mouth: Saint-Charles River
  - location: Quebec (city) (sector Lac-Saint-Charles)
  - coordinates: 46.905645°N 71.365407°W
  - elevation: 152 m
- Length: 26.6 km (16.5 mi)
- Basin size: 82 km^{2} (32 sq mi)

Basin features
- River system: Saint Lawrence River
- Tributaries
  - left: (Upward from the mouth) outlet of two small unidentified lakes, outlet of Lac Beauport, unidentified stream, outlet (via Lac Morin) of Lac Cité-Joie.
  - right: (Upward from the mouth) Valet stream, outlet of Yellow and Josée lakes, outlet of two small unidentified lakes, outlet of Neigette and Écho lakes, outlet of Paisible lake, outlet of Bastien, Bonnet and Blue lakes, unidentified stream.

The Jaune River (English: Yellow River) is a tributary of the Saint-Charles River flowing in the administrative region of Capitale-Nationale, in the province of Quebec, Canada. The course of the river crosses:

- the La Jacques-Cartier Regional County Municipality: municipalities of Stoneham-et-Tewkesbury and lac-Beauport;
- Quebec City.

This Quebec river which is 26.6 kilometres (16.5 mi) long flows into the Saint-Charles River a little downstream of the outlet of Saint-Charles Lake, in Quebec City (sector of Lac-Saint-Charles), in the administrative region of Capitale-Nationale, in the province of Quebec, Canada.

The main roads serving this small valley are rue Jacques-Bédard, rue des Chalets, chemin de la Grande Ligne, rue du Vallon, boulevard Henri-Bourassa, rue de Champéry, boulevard du Lac and chemin du Tour-du-Lac.

The surface of the Jaune River (except the rapids areas) is generally frozen from the beginning of December to the end of March; however, safe circulation on the ice is generally done from the end of December to the beginning of March. The water level of the river varies with the seasons and the precipitation; the spring flood occurs in March or April.

== Geography ==
The Jaune River originates at the confluence of two mountain streams about 10 km north of Beauport Lake, in the southwestern part of the grounds of the Séminaire de Québec. This river flows south through the Notre-Dame-des-Laurentides sector, at Charlesbourg, before flowing into the Saint-Charles River at Lac-Saint-Charles.

Its watershed, which rises north of the municipality of Lac-Beauport, is 82 square kilometres (32 sq mi) and includes the sub-basins of Beauport Lake and Valet stream. The Jaune River sub-basin is located in a leafy area characterized mainly by the climatic range of the maple forest with yellow birch and beech.

Land use in the Jaune River sub-basin is essentially forest and most of the territory is in its natural state. Human activity is present in the form of low-density urban developments on the banks of the Jaune River and Lake Beauport and some recreational and tourist facilities (skiing, golf, accommodation establishments, summer camps). The Jaune River sub-basin is also characterized by the presence of a large number of dams, often used for recreational and resort purposes.

The course of the Jaune River descends on 26.6 kilometres (16.5 mi), with a drop of 236 metres (774 ft), according to the following segments:

- 6.1 kilometres (3.8 mi) to the south with a steep drop, entering the territory of Lac-Beauport before coming back for a short foray into Stoneham-et-Tewkesbury, then going south and collecting the discharge (coming from the west) from lakes Bastien, Bonnet and Bleu at the end of the segment, and crossing Lake Morin (length: 0.9 kilometres (0.56 mi); altitude: 352 metres (1,155 ft)) on 0.7 kilometres (0.43 mi) to its mouth;
- 5.3 kilometres (3.3 mi) to the southeast, collecting the outlet (coming from the west) from Lake Paisible, to the outlet (coming from the east) from Beauport Lake;
- 4.4 kilometres (2.7 mi) to the south, collecting the outlet (coming from the west) from Neigette and Écho lakes, crossing Simons waterfall, collecting an unidentified stream (coming from the northwest), to the outlet (coming from the west) of Lakes Jaune and Josée;
- 5.5 kilometres (3.4 mi) to the south by winding through a flared and steep valley, crossing the Notre-Dame-des-Laurentides neighborhood and branching west towards the end of the segment, up to the Laurentian highway;
- 4.4 kilometres (2.7 mi) south-west passing north-west of Mont Irma-LeVasseur, the summit of which reaches 280 metres (920 ft), meandering through a plain in urban areas and collecting the Valet stream (coming from the north) at the end of the segment, until its mouth.

From this confluence, the current descends on 32.8 kilometres (20.4 mi) generally towards the south-east, then towards the north-east, following the course of the Saint-Charles River.

== Toponymy ==
From 1898 to 1928, Rivière-Jaune was the name of the post office serving a small town established around the Pelletier mill. The parish church of Notre-Dame-des-Laurentides, founded in 1905, was located at this location; its development was long linked to forest work and the wood industries. As for the name Rivière Jaune, it is old and Joseph Bouchette quotes it in 1815. It would be explained by the yellow color of the waters which run on a bottom in several sandy places.

The toponym "rivière Jaune" was formalized on December 5, 1968, at the Commission de toponymie du Québec.

== See also ==
- La Jacques-Cartier Regional County Municipality
- Quebec City
- Stoneham-et-Tewkesbury
- Charlesbourg
- Lac-Beauport
- Lac-Saint-Charles
- Saint-Charles River
- Beauport Lake
- List of rivers of Quebec
