= Hibou River =

Tributary of rivière des Hurons, in Québec, Canada

- Location within Quebec

Location
- Country: Canada
- Province: Quebec
- Region: Capitale-Nationale
- MRC: La Jacques-Cartier Regional County Municipality
- Municipality: Stoneham-et-Tewkesbury

Physical characteristics
- Source: Drouin Lake
  - location: Stoneham-et-Tewkesbury
  - coordinates: 47°03′39″N 71°22′13″W
  - elevation: 503
- Mouth: Rivière des Hurons (Saint-Charles Lake)
  - location: Stoneham-et-Tewkesbury
  - coordinates: 46°58′52″N 71°22′18″W
  - elevation: 159 m
- Length: 10.9 km (6.8 mi)

Basin features
- Tributaries
  - left: Two unidentified stream.
  - right: Unidentified stream.

The rivière Hibou (English: Owl River) is a tributary of the rivière des Hurons, flowing in the heart of the municipality of the townships of Stoneham-et-Tewkesbury, in the La Jacques-Cartier Regional County Municipality, in the administrative region of Capitale-Nationale, in the province of Quebec, in Canada.

Located north of Quebec (city), the Hibou river valley is mainly served by the Grande-Ligne path, the Hibou path and a few urban streets.

The surface of the Hibou River (except the rapids areas) is generally frozen from the beginning of December to the end of March; however, safe circulation on the ice is generally done from the end of December to the beginning of March. The water level of the river varies with the seasons and the precipitation; the spring flood occurs in March or April.

== Geography ==
The Hibou River rises at the mouth of Lake Drouin which is landlocked between the mountains in the northern part of the municipality of Stoneham-et-Tewkesbury in the Laurentians. This landlocked source is located at:

- 1.4 kilometres (0.87 mi) south-west of a curve of the route 175 (Laurentian Autoroute);
- 4.6 kilometres (2.9 mi) south-west of the village center of Saint-Adolphe;
- 8.8 kilometres (5.5 mi) north-west of the confluence of the Hibou river and the rivière des Hurons.

From Lake Drouin, the Hibou River flows over 10.9 kilometres (6.8 mi), with a drop of 344 metres (1,129 ft), according to the following segments:

- 7.7 kilometres (4.8 mi) to the south by crossing a small unidentified lake at the start of the segment, cutting five paths including Chemin Blanc and Chemin du Hameau, forming a hook to the west to collect a stream (coming from the west), to the Raymond-Lortie road bridge located on the west side of Mont Hibou (summit at 380 kilometres (240 mi));
- 2.6 kilometres (1.6 mi) to the south by winding in places and forming a curve towards the east, and passing from the east side of the village of Stoneham, to the Tewkesbury Road;
- 0.6 kilometres (0.37 mi) towards the south-east by crossing the Chemin de la Grande-Ligne, up to its confluence with the Huron river.

From this confluence, the current from the Hibou River flows for 6.8 kilometres (4.2 mi) south following the course of the Huron River, then crosses Lake Saint-Charles on 5.0 kilometres (3.1 mi) towards the south-east, then descends on 33.8 kilometres (21.0 mi) generally towards the south-east and the north-east, following the course of the Saint-Charles River which deviates rivière des Hurons erse on the east bank of Saint-Laurent river.

== Toponymy ==
The toponyms "Rivière Hibou" and "Mont Hibou" are linked.

The toponym "Hibou river" was formalized on August 2, 1974, at the Commission de toponymie du Québec.

== See also ==
- La Jacques-Cartier Regional County Municipality
- Stoneham-et-Tewkesbury, a municipality
- Rivière des Hurons,
- Saint-Charles Lake
- Saint-Charles River
- St. Lawrence River
- List of rivers of Quebec
