= Montagne de l'Épaule =

- Location within Quebec

Highest point
- Peak: 460

Geography
- Country: Canada
- Region: Quebec
- Range coordinates: 47°07′44″N 71°21′19″W
- Parent range: Laurentian Mountains

The Montagne de l'Épaule (English: Mountain of the Shoulder) peaks at 460 metres (1,510 ft) in Jacques-Cartier National Park, in the municipality of Stoneham-et-Tewkesbury, in La Jacques-Cartier Regional County Municipality, in the administrative region of Capitale-Nationale, in Quebec, Canada.

== Geography ==
The summit of the shoulder mountain is located at:

- 0.5 kilometres (0.31 mi) east of the Jacques-Cartier River;
- 1.1 kilometres (0.68 mi) north of the confluence of the Rivière à l'Épaule and the Jacques-Cartier River;
- 6.2 kilometres (3.9 mi) east of the village center of Stoneham-et-Tewkesbury;
- 2.2 kilometres (1.4 mi) north-west of route 175.

The Montagne de l'Épaule is wedged between the Jacques-Cartier River which flows on the west side and the Rivière à l'Épaule which is on the east side.

== Mountain path ==
A hiking trail designated L'Éperon stretching over 5.5 kilometres (3.4 mi) bypasses the Mountain de l'Épaule to reach its summit which culminates at 460 metres (1,510 ft) of altitude. This trail begins at km 3, one of the first trails near the entrance to the Jacques-Cartier National Park which is located at 103 chemin du Parc-National in Stoneham-et-Tewkesbury. From the parking lot, after walking a hundred meters along the road, hikers enter the forest until the intersection. Hikers can then choose to take the gradual climb or a steeper climb.

The route provides views of the Jacques-Cartier River valley. Informational panels along the route provide information about the history of the Laurentians. The summit of Montagne de l'Épaule lies between the Jacques-Cartier and Rivière à l'Épaule valleys.

== History ==
In the past, the Rivière à l'Épaule and the Jacques-Cartier River were used to float the logs to the sawmills downstream.

== Toponymy ==
The toponym "montagne de l'Épaule" is linked to the toponym of the river of the same name.

The toponym "montagne de l'Épaule" was formalized on August 2, 1974, at the Place Names Bank of the Commission de toponymie du Québec.

== See also ==
- La Jacques-Cartier Regional County Municipality
- Stoneham-et-Tewkesbury, a municipality
- Jacques-Cartier National Park
- Rivière à l'Épaule
- Jacques-Cartier River
- Lac Jacques-Cartier Massif
