= Turgeon River (rivière des Hurons) =

- Location within Quebec Location within Canada
- Native name: Rivière Turgeon (French)

Location
- Country: Canada
- Province: Quebec
- Administrative region: Capitale-Nationale
- MRC: La Jacques-Cartier Regional County Municipality
- Municipality: Stoneham-et-Tewkesbury

Physical characteristics
- Source: Demers Lake
  - location: Stoneham-et-Tewkesbury
  - coordinates: 47.06429°N 71.23290°W
  - elevation: 686
- Mouth: Rivière des Hurons
  - location: Stoneham-et-Tewkesbury
  - coordinates: 47.05806°N 71.29972°W
  - elevation: 352 m
- Length: 6.9 km (4.3 mi)

Basin features
- River system: St. Lawrence River
- Tributaries
  - left: Two unidentified streams.

The Turgeon River is a river flowing through the municipality of the United Townships of Stoneham-et-Tewkesbury, located north of the Quebec (city), in the La Jacques-Cartier Regional County Municipality, in the administrative region of Capitale-Nationale, in the province from Quebec, to Canada.

The upper part of the Turgeon River valley is served by secondary forest roads.

The surface of the Turgeon River (except the rapids areas) is generally frozen from the beginning of December to the end of March; however, safe circulation on the ice is generally done from the end of December to the beginning of March. The water level of the river varies with the seasons and the precipitation; the spring flood occurs in March or April.

== Geography ==
The Turgeon River rises at the mouth of Demers Lake (length: 0.9 kilometres (0.56 mi); altitude: 686 metres (2,251 ft)) located in a forest and mountain area. This small lake has a small marsh area in the northern part. The mouth of this lake is located at:

- 5.1 kilometres (3.2 mi) north-east of the confluence of the Turgeon and Hurons rivers;
- 5.9 kilometres (3.7 mi) north-east of the center of the village of Saint-Adolphe;
- 7.5 kilometres (4.7 mi) north-west of the village center of Sainte-Brigitte-de-Laval;
- 11.9 kilometres (7.4 mi) north-east of the center of the village of Stoneham.

From its source (Demers Lake), the Turgeon River flows over 6.9 kilometres (4.3 mi), with a drop of 334 metres (1,096 ft), according to the following segments:

- 2.9 kilometres (1.8 mi) towards the southwest by forming a curve towards the east, then crossing Lake Turgeon (length: 0.7 kilometres (0.43 mi); altitude: 352 metres (1,155 ft)) to its mouth. Note: this small lake has a marsh area on the east side;
- 2.8 kilometres (1.7 mi) south-west passing on the south side of a mountain reaching 684 metres (2,244 ft) and collecting a stream (coming from the south-east and being the outlet of 'a small unidentified lake), up to a bend in the river, corresponding to an intermittent stream (coming from the south-east);
- 1.2 kilometres (0.75 mi) north-west with a steep drop, to its confluence with the rivière des Hurons.

From this confluence, the current descends the Huron River on 21.1 kilometres (13.1 mi), crosses Lake Saint-Charles on 5.0 kilometres (3.1 mi) to the southeast, then descends on 33.8 kilometres (21.0 mi) generally towards the south-east and the north-east, following the course of the Saint-Charles River which flows on the east bank of the St. Lawrence River.

== Toponymy ==
The toponym "Rivière Turgeon" was formalized on August 2, 1974, at the Commission de toponymie du Québec.

== See also ==
- St. Lawrence River
- List of rivers of Quebec
