= Rivière à l'Épaule =

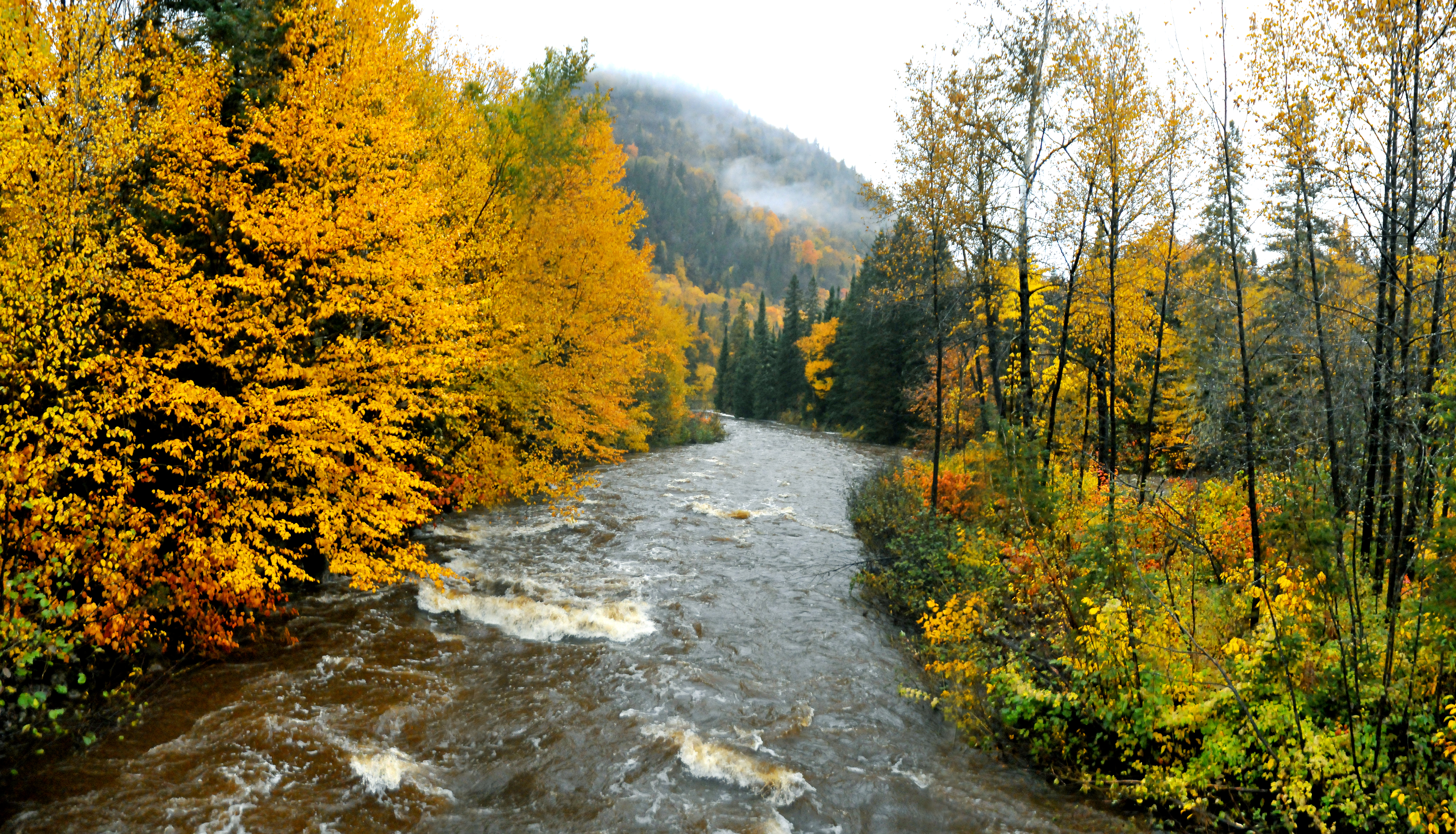

- Location within Quebec

Location
- Country: Canada
- Province: Quebec
- Region: Capitale-Nationale
- Regional County Municipality: La Jacques-Cartier and La Côte-de-Beaupré
- Unorganized territory and a municipality: Lac-Jacques-Cartier and Stoneham-et-Tewkesbury

Physical characteristics
- Source: Petit lac à l'Épaule
  - location: Lac-Jacques-Cartier
  - coordinates: 47°07′11″N 71°21′30″W
  - elevation: 772
- Mouth: Jacques-Cartier River
  - location: Stoneham-et-Tewkesbury
  - coordinates: 47°07′11″N 71°21′34″W
  - elevation: 243 m
- Length: 25.0 km (15.5 mi)

Basin features
- Tributaries
  - right: (Upward from the mouth) Discharge of an unidentified mountain lake, discharge of a little and unidentified mountain lake, discharge of lac Huppé.

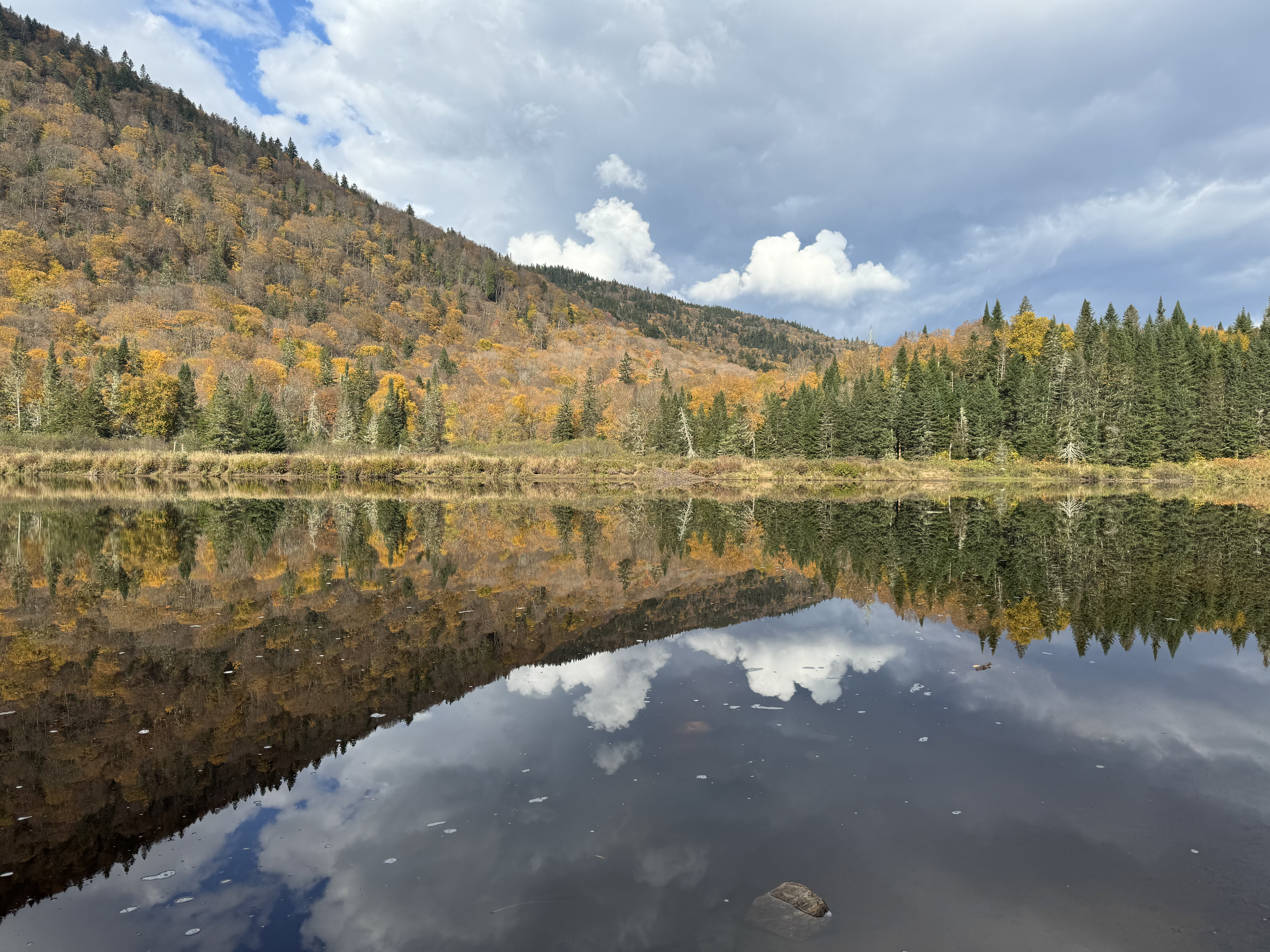
A slow-moving section of the river

The Rivière à l'Épaule (pronounced [ʁivjɛʁ a lepol]; French for 'Shoulder River') is a tributary of the Jacques-Cartier River, flowing in the administrative region of Capitale-Nationale, in Quebec, Canada. The course of the river crosses the unorganized territory of Lac-Jacques-Cartier in the La Côte-de-Beaupré Regional County Municipality, as well as the township municipality unis de Stoneham-et-Tewkesbury, located in the MRC La Jacques-Cartier Regional County Municipality.

The course of the river flows entirely in the Jacques-Cartier National Park (at the eastern limit of the park) which is affiliated with the Société des établissements de plein air du Québec (Sépaq).

The Rivière à l'Épaule valley is mainly served on the east side by the route 175 which links the towns of Quebec and Saguenay. Some secondary roads serve this area for forestry and recreational tourism activities.

Forestry is the main economic activity in the sector; recreational tourism, second.

The surface of the Rivière à l'Épaule (except the rapids) is generally frozen from the beginning of December to the end of March; safe circulation on the ice is generally done from the end of December to the beginning of March.

== Geography ==
The Rivière à l'Épaule originates from Petit lac à l'Épaule (length: 1.3 kilometres (0.81 mi); width: 0.4 kilometres (0.25 mi); altitude: 772 metres (2,533 ft)), located in the unorganized territory of Lac-Jacques-Cartier, in the Laurentides Wildlife Reserve (at the eastern limit of Jacques-Cartier National Park), in the MRC of La Côte-de-Beaupré Regional County Municipality. This lake has a marsh area on its north shore. The route 175 passes on the eastern shore of this lake. The Roger-Gosselin and Gar-Porter mountains are located on the east side of this small head lake.

The Rivière à l'Épaule drains a catchment area of 87 square kilometres (34 sq mi).

From the dam at the mouth of Petit lac à l'Épaule, the course of Rivière à l'Épaule descends for 25.0 kilometres (15.5 mi) towards the southwest generally in a straight line until Jacques-Cartier River with a drop of 552 metres (1,811 ft) according to the following segments: 8.0 kilometres (5.0 mi) towards the southwest, in particular by crossing on 2.9 kilometres (1.8 mi) the lac à l'Épaule (altitude: 651 metres (2,136 ft) over its full length; then 17.0 kilometres (10.6 mi) south-west in a deep valley until its mouth.

The Rivière à l'Épaule flows onto the east bank of the Jacques-Cartier River, at the foot of the Montagne de l'Épaule. From this confluence, the current descends the Jacques-Cartier River for 41.9 kilometres (26.0 mi) generally south to the northeast bank of the St. Lawrence River.

== Toponymy ==
The origin of this toponym is very old. Its meaning remains uncertain, however, the main hypothesis considered describes that the shoulder (shoulder) could here designate a flat with a fairly gentle slope used to connect two valleys whose level differs. The phenomenon is common in regions that have experienced glaciations.

A report dated 1829 and signed by the surveyor John Adams mentions the L'Épaule River and the Montagne de l'Épaule, while William Ware describes the surroundings of Lac Épaule in 1835. This area was frequented in the 17th century by Jesuits who went, by a path traced by the Innu, to lac Saint-Jean. The plan of the Wendat (Huron) chief Nicholas Vincent, drawn up around 1829, identifies the river under its Wendat name Hüaonjacaronté.

This sector, on the outskirts of the settlers' settlements, has undergone some attempts to clear it, because abattis were spotted there in 1867. The government then built a shelter there for travelers from Lac-Saint-Jean. Later, a road to Jacques-Cartier Lake. Beginning in 1907, sport fishermen were in turn served by accommodation facilities, to which was later added Camp Devlin. Lac à l'Épaule hosted, in the summer of 1943, Sir Winston Churchill and Franklin Delano Roosevelt, gathered in Quebec for an Allied conference. A larger pavilion, erected by a logging company in 1946, later became a meeting place reserved for government officials. A landmark event in contemporary history took place there in September 1962 and made the expression make, hold a shoulder-to-shoulder famous. A special council of ministers of the Quebec government was there, in fact, to decide to call a referendum election on the theme "Give Hydro-Quebec the mandate to unify and integrate Quebec hydroelectric resources".

The toponym "Rivière à l'Épaule" was formalized on December 5, 1968 at the Place Names Bank of the Commission de toponymie du Québec.

== See also ==
- Laurentides Wildlife Reserve
- Jacques-Cartier National Park
- Montagne de l'Épaule
- Lac-Jacques-Cartier, an unorganized territory
- Stoneham-et-Tewkesbury, a municipality
- La Côte-de-Beaupré Regional County Municipality
- La Jacques-Cartier Regional County Municipality
- Lac à l'Épaule
- Jacques-Cartier River
- List of rivers of Quebec

== Bibliography ==
- Jacques-Cartier Basin Corporation (2013). Plan directeur de l'eau de la zone de gestion intégrée de l'eau de la Jacques-Cartier (English: Water Master Plan for the Jacques-Cartier Integrated Water Management Zone) (PDF). p. 391..
