= Rivière des Hurons (Saint-Charles Lake) =

Tributary of Saint-Charles Lake, in Quebec, Canada

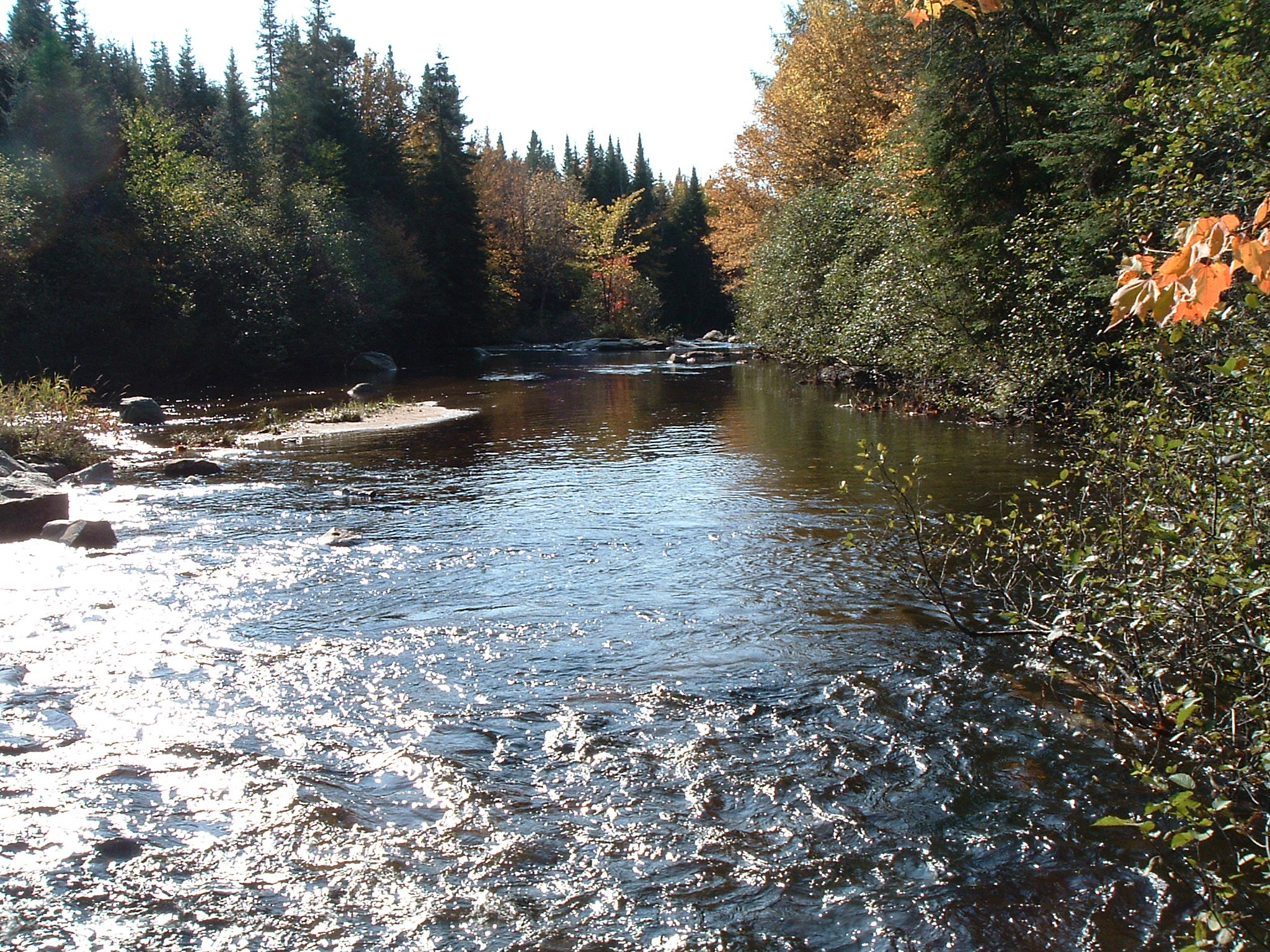

- Location within Quebec

Location
- Country: Canada
- Province: Quebec
- Region: Capitale-Nationale
- MRC: La Jacques-Cartier Regional County Municipality
- Municipality: Stoneham-et-Tewkesbury

Physical characteristics
- Source: Confluence of two mountain streams
  - location: Stoneham-et-Tewkesbury
  - coordinates: 47°05′17″N 71°13′55″W
  - elevation: 659
- Mouth: Saint-Charles Lake
  - location: Stoneham-et-Tewkesbury
  - coordinates: 47°57′13″N 71°23′28″W
  - elevation: 152 m
- Length: 29.5 km (18.3 mi)

Basin features
- Tributaries
  - left: (Upward from the mouth) discharge from an unidentified lake, three unidentified streams, mountain stream, Turgeon River, three mountain streams.
  - right: (Upward from the mouth) Durand brook, Hibou River, Noire River, outlet of Lac à la Loutre, outlet of an unidentified lake, outlet of a small unidentified lake.

The rivière des Hurons (English: Hurons's River) is a river flowing in the heart of the municipality of Cantons-unis de Stoneham-et-Tewkesbury, located north of Quebec (city), in the La Jacques-Cartier Regional County Municipality, in the administrative region of Capitale-Nationale, in province from Quebec, to Canada.

This watercourse turns out to be the most important tributary of Saint-Charles Lake which constitutes one of the drinking water reserves of the city of Quebec.

The Hurons river valley is mainly served by the Grande-Ligne road (on the northwest shore), the route 175, the Saint-Edmond road, the Talbot boulevard, first Avenue and Lepire Road.

The surface of the Huron River (except the rapids areas) is generally frozen from the beginning of December to the end of March; however, safe circulation on the ice is generally done from the end of December to the beginning of March. The water level of the river varies with the seasons and the precipitation; the spring flood occurs in March or April.

== Geography ==
The Huron River originates in the northeast part of the municipality of Stoneham-et-Tewkesbury in the Laurentians, a few kilometers northeast of Saint-Adolphe and ends in the sector of Marais-du-Nord Natural Reserve. The length of the watercourse is 29.5 kilometres (18.3 mi) and its watershed has an area of approximately 135 square kilometres (52 sq mi). This includes the Hibou River and Durand stream sub-basins. The Huron River is part of the Saint-Charles River watershed.

From its source, the Huron River flows over 29.5 kilometres (18.3 mi), with a drop of 507 metres (1,663 ft), according to the following segments:

- 1.4 kilometres (0.87 mi) westward down the mountain, to a bend in the river, corresponding to the outlet of a stream (coming from the north);
- 2.6 kilometres (1.6 mi) to the south in a flared valley crossing a small lake, up to a bend in the river;
- 2.4 kilometres (1.5 mi) south-west in a deep valley, to the outlet (coming from the north) of Lac Dubrin;
- 2.0 kilometres (1.2 mi) south in a deep valley passing on the east side of the village of Saint-Adolphe, until the confluence of the Turgeon River;
- 5.5 kilometres (3.4 mi) to the south in a deep valley by collecting the discharge (coming from the north) from Lac à la Loutre and by cutting the route 175 (route Antonio-Talbot), to the confluence of Noire River (coming from the northwest);
- 8.8 kilometres (5.5 mi) southwards passing between Mont Hibou (west side) and Mont Wright (east side) and crossing the village of Stoneham-et-Tewkesbury, until the confluence of the Hibou River (coming from the northwest);
- 1.1 kilometres (0.68 mi) south to Durand stream (coming from the west);
- 5.7 kilometres (3.5 mi) to the south, winding heavily through a plain, crossing the Marais-du-Nord nature reserve, until it meets the marsh area in the northern part of Saint-Charles Lake.

From this confluence, the current crosses Lake Saint-Charles on 5.0 kilometres (3.1 mi) towards the south-east, then descends on 33.8 kilometres (21.0 mi) generally towards the south-east and the north-east, following the course of the Saint-Charles River which flows onto the east bank of the Saint Lawrence River.

== Land use ==
Land use in the Huron River sub-basin is primarily forest. The majority of the territory is in its natural state and you can see remarkable landscapes there. The physical characteristics of the environment favor increased erosion of the banks and certain places are particularly affected. The human presence is mainly marked by some low-density urban developments and significant recreational tourism infrastructure, notably a golf club and an alpine ski center, the Stoneham Mountain Resort.

== Toponymy ==
The toponym "Rivière des Hurons" evokes the memory of the establishment of the Huron community north of Quebec. The Hurons (Wendats), driven from the Ontario peninsula in 1651 by war, famine and epidemics, came to settle in the Quebec region, with the Jesuits who had evangelized them. After having occupied several places, notably Sillery, Île d'Orléans and L'Ancienne-Lorette, they settled in La Jeune-Lorette, the site where the Village-des-Hurons, an Indian reserve now called Wendake, was established. They went up the Saint-Charles River to the lake of the same name, which they still call Lake Huron today; this latter name appears as it is in a report presented in 1829 to the Lower Canada House of Assembly by the surveyor John Adams and James P. Baby.

In addition, in Stanislas Drapeau's (1863), in the Dictionary of rivers and lakes of the province of Quebec (1914), on the map of the Laurentians park of 1942, the form Huron River is used. As early as 1795, on Jeremiah MacCarthy's The Seigniory of Charlebourg map, this watercourse was designated by the name Winter Huron. From Lake Saint-Charles, they canoeed on the Huron River. It is registered under the name R. des Hurons on the map of Taché published in 1870. They made portages between small lakes to reach the hinterland, where they were engaged in hunting and fishing. They had to negotiate with the Innu and the Algonquins who already occupied this territory. It was also along this river that the Jesuit path, from Quebec to Lac Saint-Jean, passed in the 17th century.

This route was then used for the first settlements in the township of Stoneham, of which it became the main communication route. It was also used by travelers until the construction in 1953 of Route 175, which runs parallel to the Huron River for about 25 km.

The toponym "Rivière des Hurons" was formalized on December 5, 1968, at the Commission de toponymie du Québec.

== See also ==
- St. Lawrence River
- List of rivers of Quebec
