= Noire River (rivière des Hurons) =

Tributary of rivière des Hurons, in Quebec, Canada

- Location within Quebec City
- Native name: Rivière Noire (French)

Location
- Country: Canada
- Province: Quebec
- Region: Capitale-Nationale
- MRC: La Jacques-Cartier Regional County Municipality
- Municipality: Stoneham-et-Tewkesbury

Physical characteristics
- Source: Small forest lake
  - location: Stoneham-et-Tewkesbury
  - coordinates: 47°05′27″N 71°20′47″W
  - elevation: 349
- Mouth: Rivière des Hurons
  - location: Stoneham-et-Tewkesbury
  - coordinates: 46°57′13″N 71°23′28″W
  - elevation: 200 m
- Length: 8.7 km (5.4 mi)

Basin features
- Tributaries
  - left: (Upward from the mouth) discharge from an unidentified small lake, unidentified stream, unidentified stream.
  - right: (Upward from the mouth) Six unidentified streams.

The rivière Noire (English: Black River) is a tributary of the rivière des Hurons, flowing in the heart of the municipality of the townships of Stoneham-et-Tewkesbury, located north of the city of Quebec, in the La Jacques-Cartier Regional County Municipality, in the administrative region of the Capitale-Nationale, in the province of Quebec, in Canada.

The Black River valley is mainly served by Route 175 and boulevard Talbot.

The surface of the Black River (except the rapids areas) is generally frozen from the beginning of December to the end of March; however, safe circulation on the ice is generally done from the end of December to the beginning of March. The water level of the river varies with the seasons and the precipitation; the spring flood occurs in March or April.

== Geography ==
The Black River rises from a small forest lake located on the east side of Talbot Boulevard, at the height of kilometer 72.5 of the Antonio-Talbot road in the heart of the municipality of Stoneham-et-Tewkesbury in the Laurentians and 4.1 kilometres (2.5 mi) northwest of the village center of Saint-Adolphe.

From its source, the Black River flows over 8.7 kilometres (5.4 mi) in a deep valley, with a drop of 149 metres (489 ft). Its course flows south generally between route 175 (route Antonio-Talbot) and boulevard Talbot, except two excursions to the west by cutting boulevard Talbot, to its confluence with the rivière des Hurons (coming from the northeast).

From this confluence, the current descends on 15.6 kilometres (9.7 mi) the course of the Huron River, then crosses Lake Saint-Charles on 5.0 kilometres (3.1 mi) to the southeast, then descends on 33.8 kilometres (21.0 mi) generally towards the south-east and the north-east, following the course of the Saint-Charles River which flows on the east bank of the St. Lawrence River.

== Toponymy ==
This toponymic designation appears on a 1931 map. This name derives from the fact that, during heavy rains, the river water from the high mountains bordering it turns black.

The toponym "Rivière Noire" was formalized on September 28, 2004, at the Commission de toponymie du Québec.

== See also ==
- St. Lawrence River
- List of rivers of Quebec
