= Linear park of the Saint-Charles and Berger rivers =

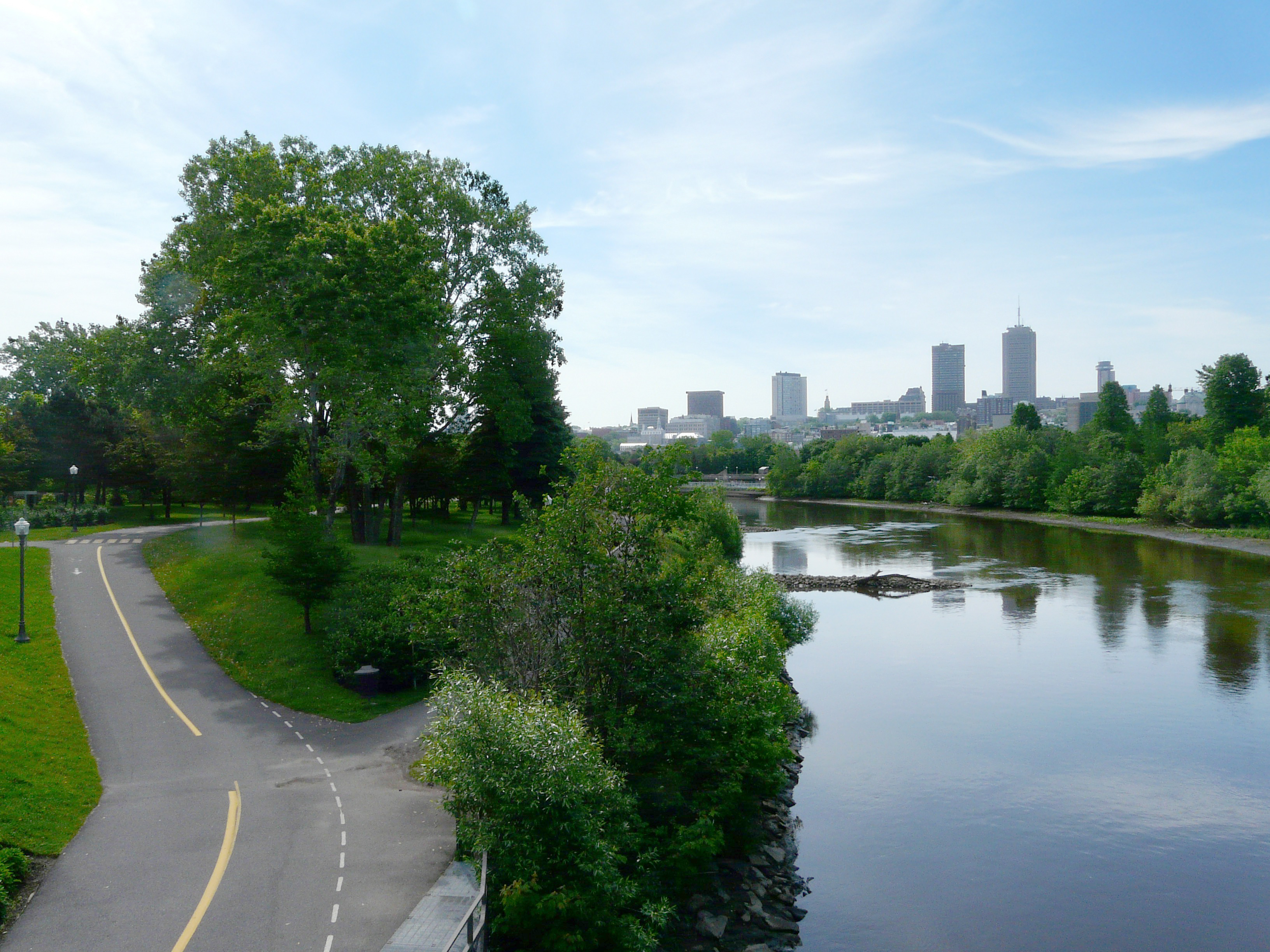
- Interactive map of Linear park of the Saint-Charles and Berger rivers
- Location: Quebec (city)
- Created: September 17, 2008
- Operator: Quebec (city)

The linear park of the Saint-Charles and Berger rivers (French: Parc linéaire des rivières Saint-Charles et du Berger) is a public linear park of the Quebec city. It runs along the rivers Saint-Charles and du Berger between Saint-Charles Lake and port of Québec. It has a 32 km footpath and a 8 km cycle path on Rivière-Saint-Charles Corridor.

== Portrait ==
=== Development ===
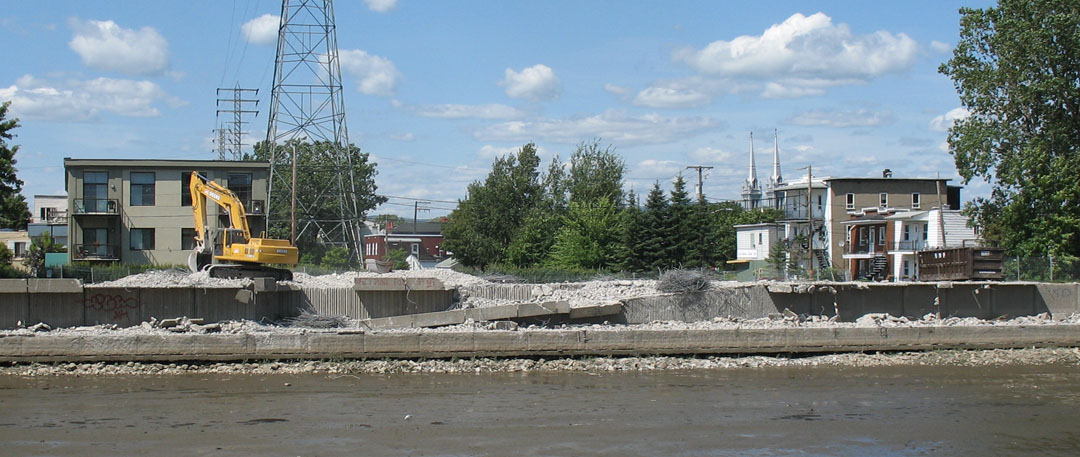
Destruction of concrete low walls for the renaturalization of the banks of the Saint-Charles River at Limoilou in 2006.

The park was inaugurated on September 17, 2008, under the name Parc linear de la rivière Saint-Charles. Its development is linked to the cleanup and redevelopment of the river banks which, in total, required investments of $160 million by the government of Canada, that of Quebec, the City of Quebec, as well as the Quebec Wildlife Foundation which provided a contribution of 300 000 dollars.

These works consisted of the removal of 8 km of concrete shoreline, the creation of 65,000 square metres (700,000 sq ft) of wildlife habitat including the planting of 600 hardwood and coniferous trees, 1500 shrubs and 20000 herbaceous plants, construction of 14 retention basins to prevent excess wastewater from ending up in the river during heavy rains. The objective of this work undertaken in 1996 was to renaturalize the banks in order to allow the return of aquatic avian fauna and to withdraw from the Saint-Charles River its title of the most polluted river in Canada. The development of the walking path itself will have cost nine million dollars and the renaturalization of the shores will be carried out at a cost of 25 million. These successful works allow the reappearance of various species that were no longer found there such as the cormorant or the great blue heron.

The inauguration day, despite the rain, 280 walkers participated in the activities, offering different routes on the trails and a traditional Wendat show in Wendake. Starting in 2010, the Société de la rivière Saint-Charles will add to their traditional canoeing of the river hiking activities on the linear park trail for the 14th edition of the Fête de la Rivière Saint-Charles.

=== Course ===
The linear park covers the entire length of the river, from its mouth at Lake Saint-Charles to its mouth at Port de Québec. The first part covers 11 km in the part near Lake Saint-Charles is a more wild area allowing the observation of fauna and flora, in part thanks to an observation bridge. The trail has several wooden bridges using wetlands and forest. This section in the borough of La Haute-Saint-Charles ends at Château-d'Eau park, housing as its name suggests a "Chateau" style building supplying water to the Quebec water treatment plant.

The following sector becomes more urbanized and covers five kilometers in the boroughs of La Haute-Saint-Charles and that of des Rivières; it starts at Jean-Roger-Durand park in the Loretteville district, crosses Falaise and Kabir Kouba waterfall park and a few other smaller ones (Parc de l'Orme, Gaby-Pleau Park, Pincourt Park) and culminated in the city's largest park, Chauveau Park. This section is characterized by the rapids and the falls that the river crosses, as well as by the accessible activities (Interpretation center of the park of Kabir Kouba waterfall, sports activities in Chauveau park).

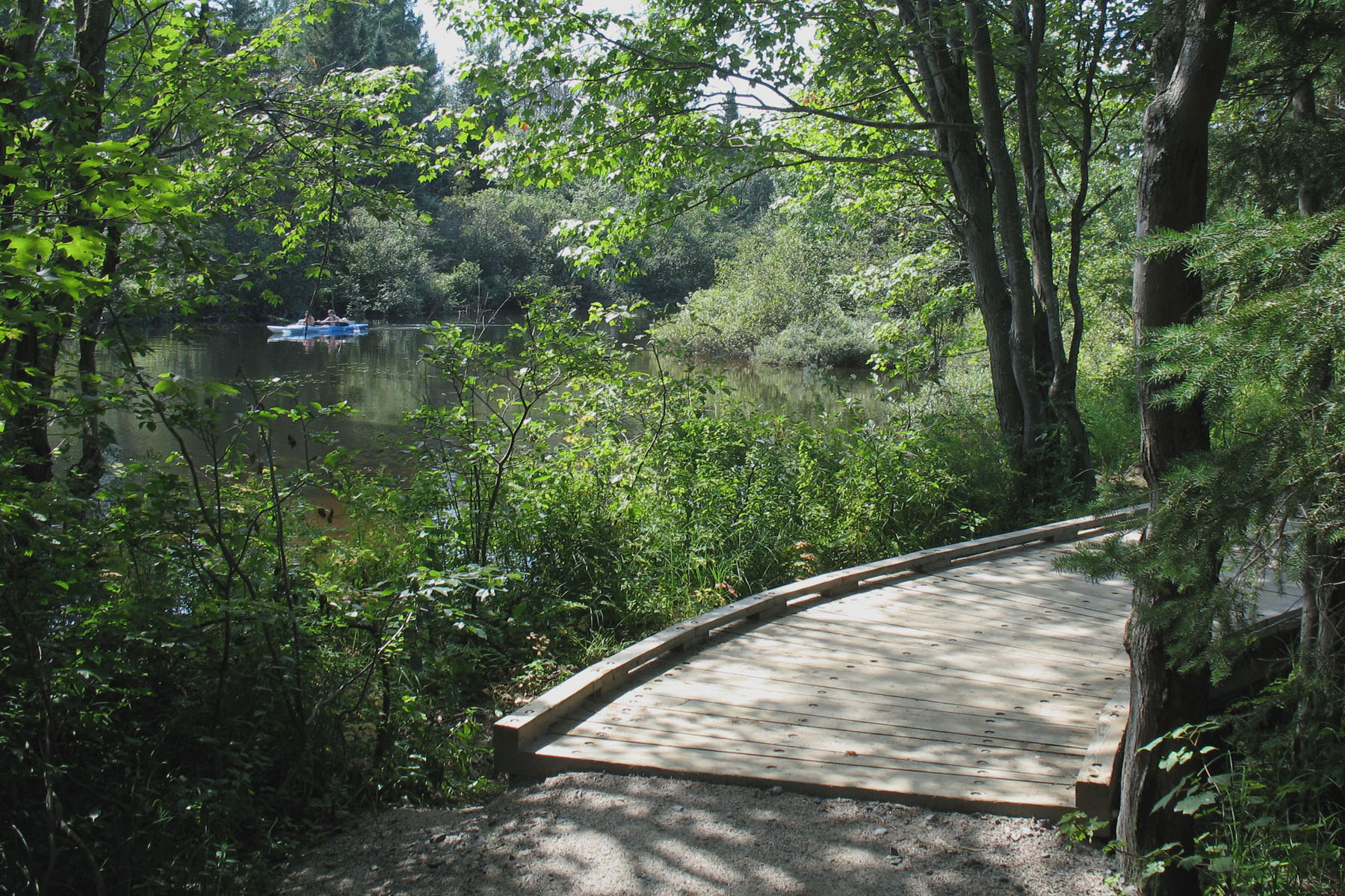
The linear park in Loretteville.

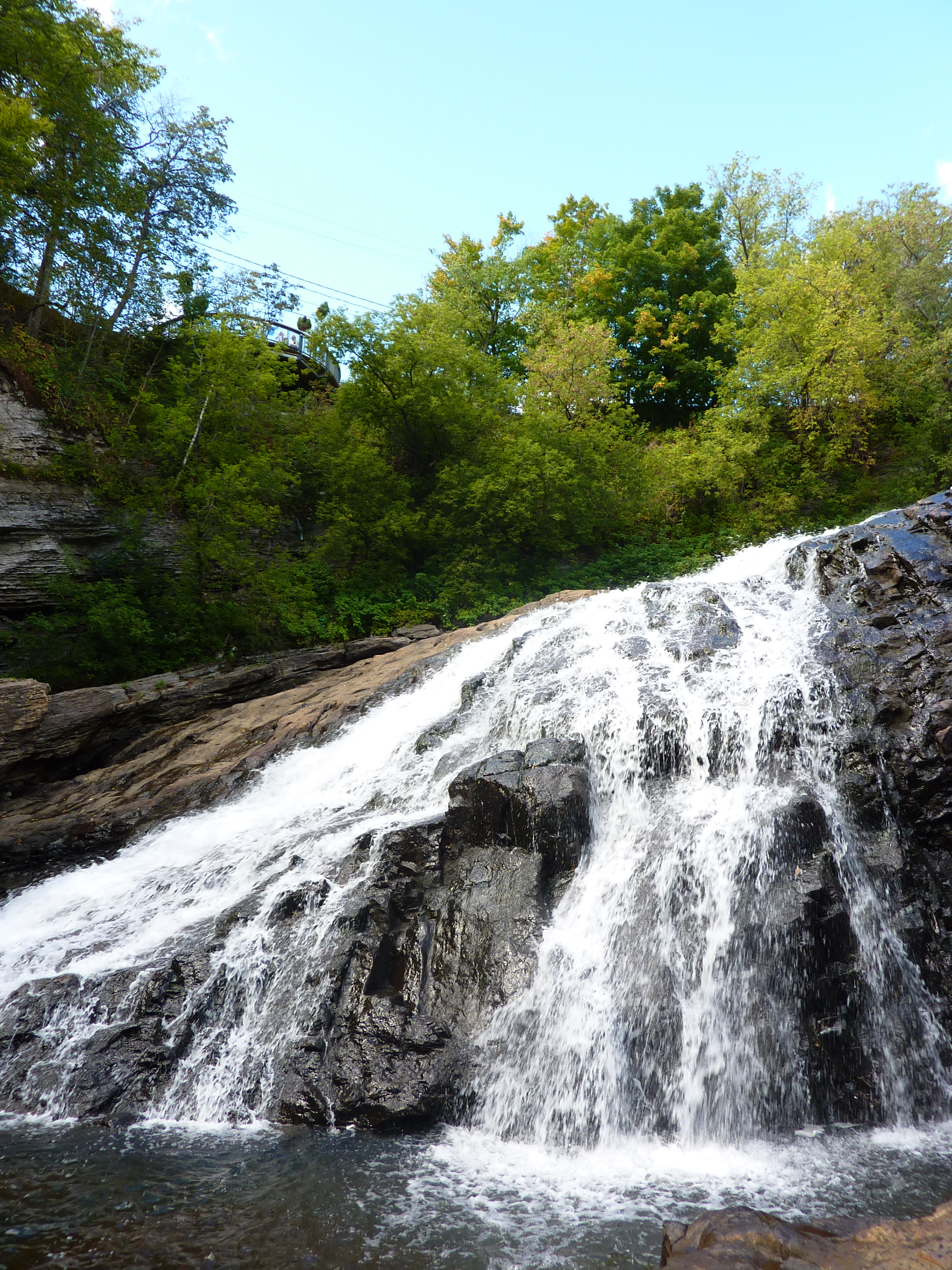
Kabir Kouba fall

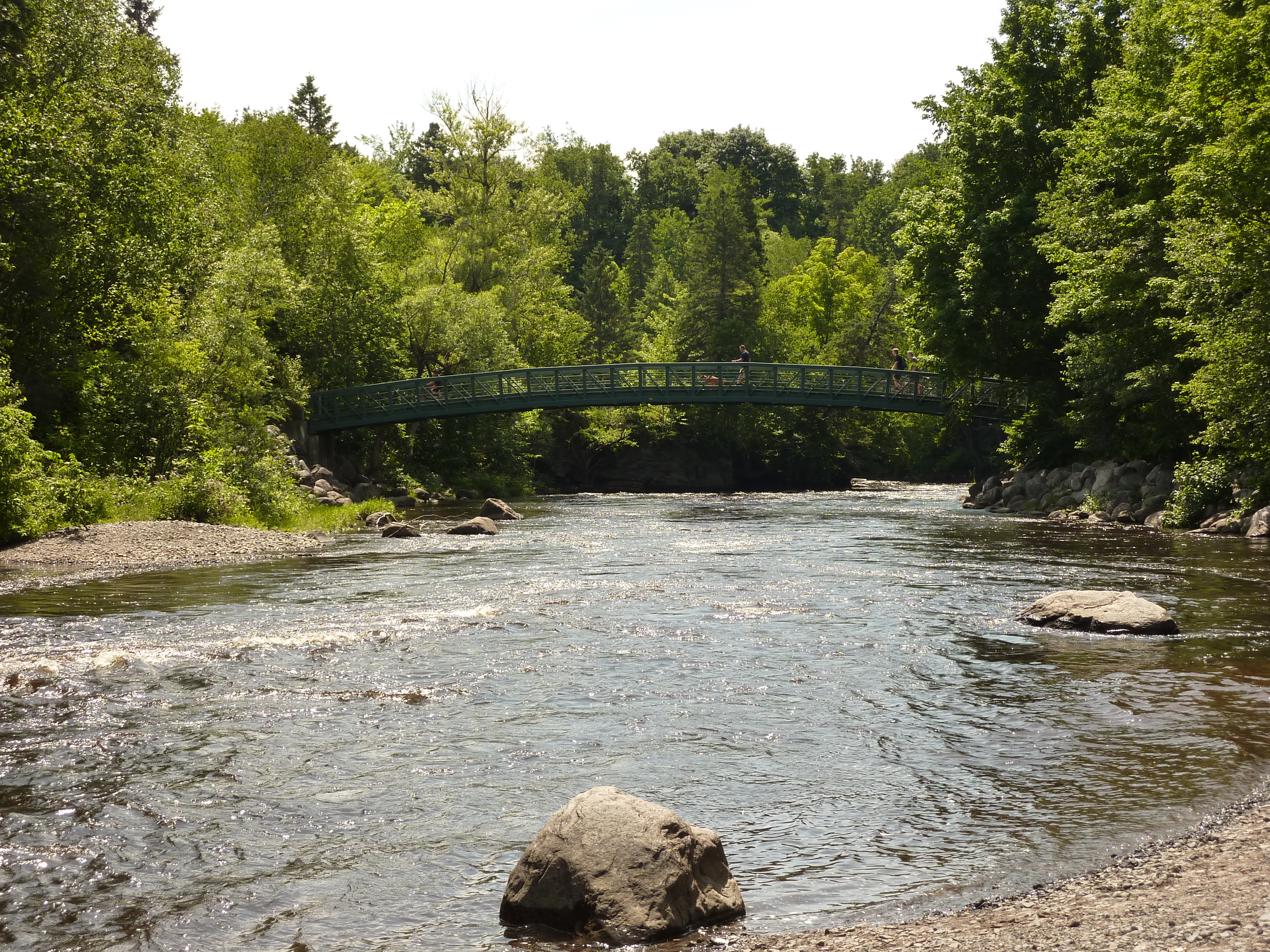
Chauveau Park

Five kilometers separate Chauveau Park and Parc Les Saules. This houses the Maison O'Neill, an ancestral house which has become a center for exhibitions and shows, and surrounded by gardens open to visitors. The following five kilometers make it possible to reach the borough of La Cité-Limoilou and Saint-Charles cemetery, by crossing the mouth of the Berger river, within Duberger park also comprising a part of the linear park on its banks. The park then covers the two banks of the Saint-Charles river through several parks, including Victoria Park, Pointe-aux-Lièvres Park and Cartier-Brébeuf National Historic Site. The natural sand islands of the Place du marais are ideal for bird watching. The trail ends at the port of Quebec, at the mouth of the Saint-Charles river on the Saint-Laurent river. The last section of 4 km on each bank is designed to accommodate cyclists and users of inline skates

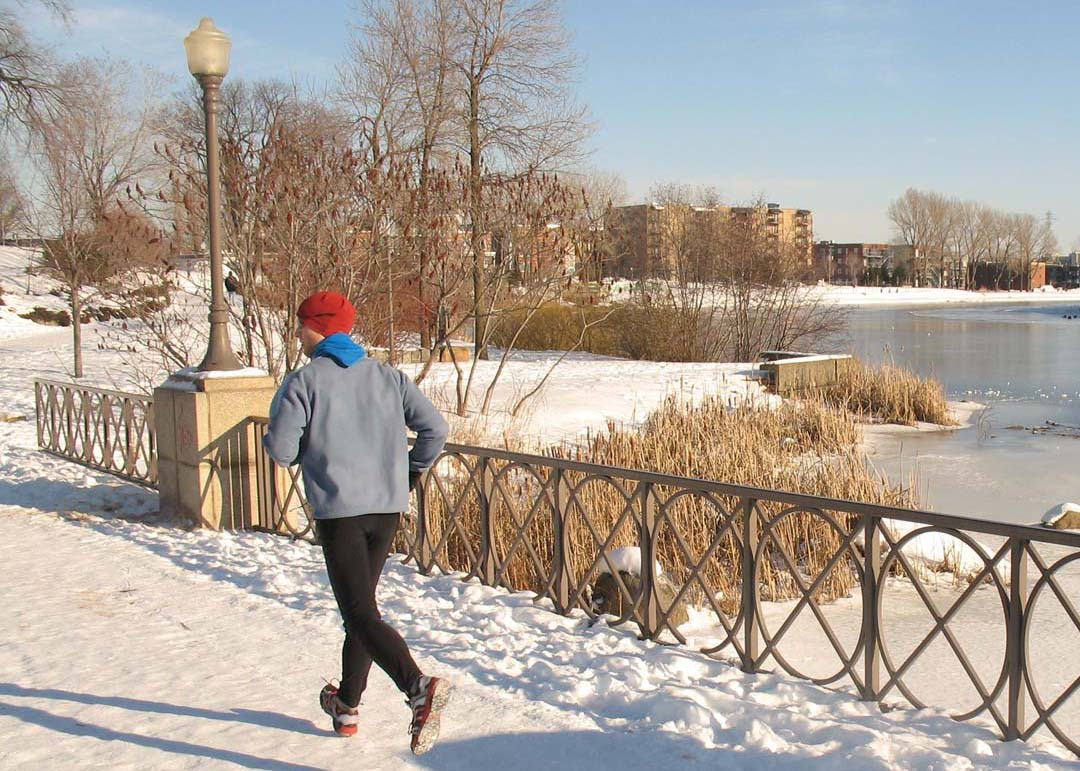
Winter hiking

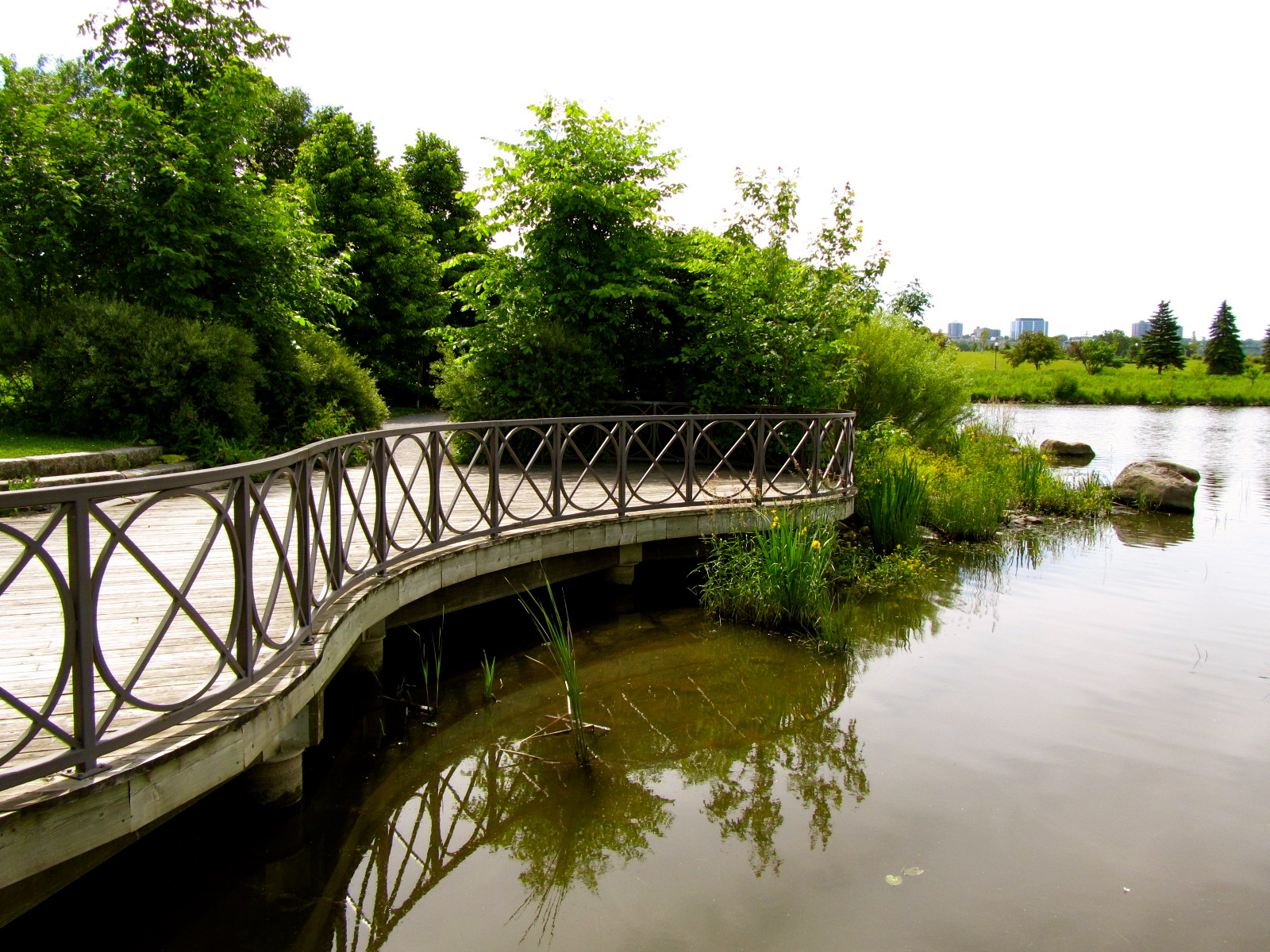
Parc Cartier-Brébeuf

Three sites allow the descent of canoes or kayaks on the river from the linear park. Audio guides offer a guided hike between Maison O'Neill and Maison Dorion-Coulombe. In winter, 27 kilometers (2011) of trails are groomed by the Société de la rivière Saint-Charles to allow walking on snow.

=== Public art ===
The section between Samson bridge and Scott bridge presents ten works of art by the Quebec artist of origin Vietnamese Truong Chanh Trung representing species of birds frequenting the river: ring-billed gull, double-crested cormorant, white pigeon, blackbird, two-colored swallow, great blue heron, mallard, kildir plover, black duck and kingfisher. These bronze sculptures are erected on top of old lamppost casks to light them up at night. They recall the return of fauna and flora on the banks of the river with its renaturalization.

Six public benches / works of art have also been set up in the sector. The bench Being river, a welded aluminum work by the artist Luce Pelletier, represents two intertwined fishes.

== See also ==
- Rivière-Saint-Charles corridor
- Saint-Charles River
- Rivière du Berger

== External links and sources ==
- Linear park site(in French).
- Video report on Télé-Québec(in French).
- Parcours du parc linear by Quebec City(in French).
