= Lac-Beauport =

- Municipality
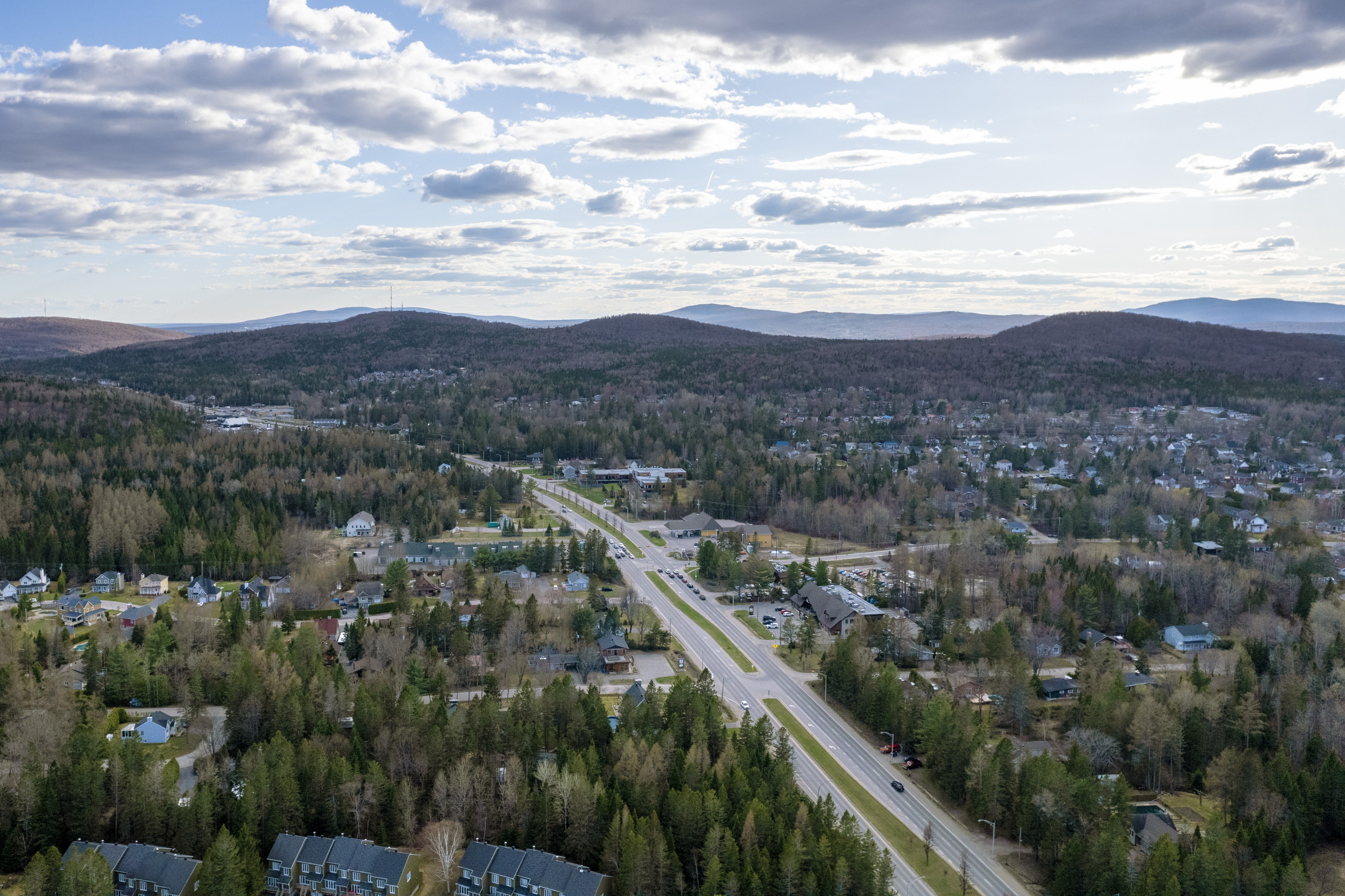
- boulevard du Lac

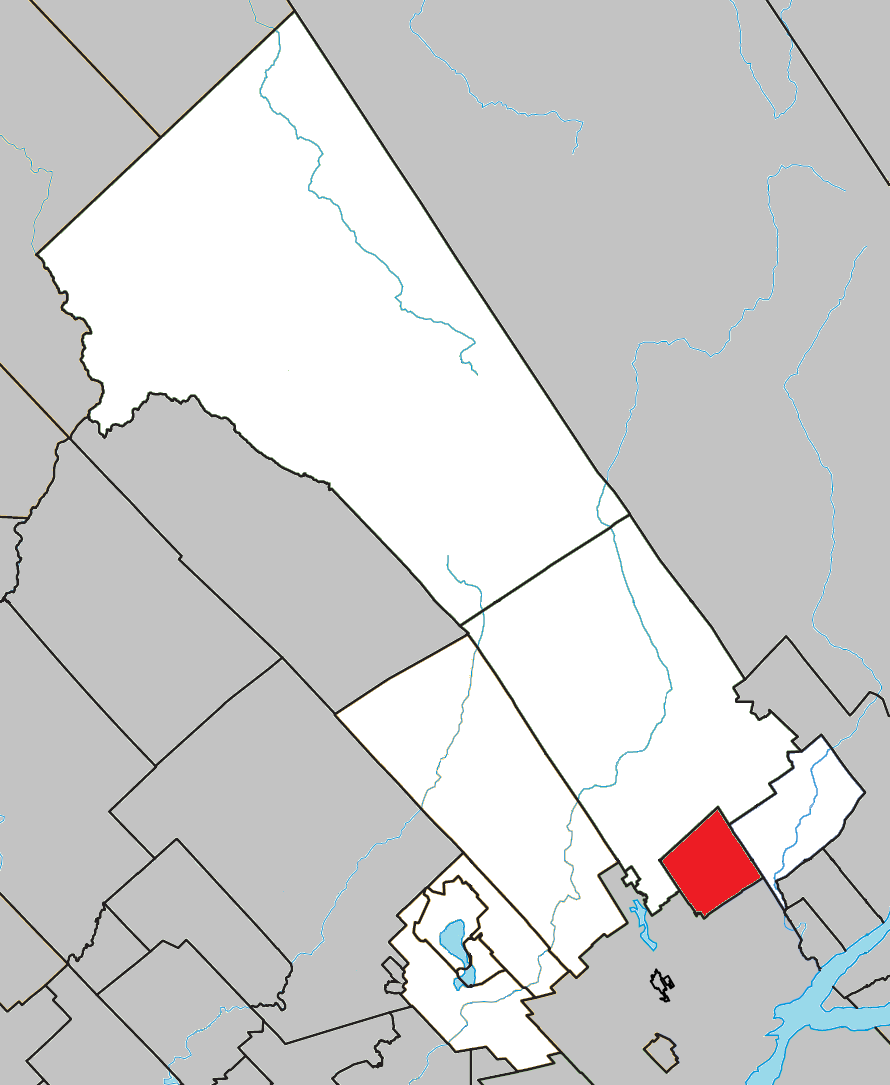
- Location within La Jacques-Cartier RCM

- Location in central Quebec
- Coordinates: 46°58′N 71°18′W
- Country: Canada
- Province: Quebec
- Region: Capitale-Nationale
- RCM: La Jacques-Cartier
- Settled: 1820
- Constituted: July 1, 1855

Government
  - Mayor: Lucie Laroche
  - Fed. riding: Montmorency—Charlevoix
  - Prov. riding: Chauveau

Area
  - Total: 64.18 km^{2} (24.78 sq mi)
  - Land: 61.73 km^{2} (23.83 sq mi)

Population (2021)
  - Total: 8,164
  - Density: 132.2/km^{2} (342/sq mi)
  - Pop (2016-21): ▲4.7%
  - Dwellings: 3,201
- Time zone: UTC−5 (EST)
  - Summer (DST): UTC−4 (EDT)
- Postal code(s): G3B 0A1
- Area codes: 418, 581
- Highways: No major routes
- Website: lac-beauport.quebec

Lac-Beauport (French pronunciation: [lak bopɔʁ]) is a town in the Capitale-Nationale region of Quebec, Canada, located on the eponymous Lake Beauport. It has a population of about 8,200 people, and lies about 25 kilometres (16 mi) north from downtown Quebec City.

Lac-Beauport is the home of Le Relais ski centre.

== Geography ==
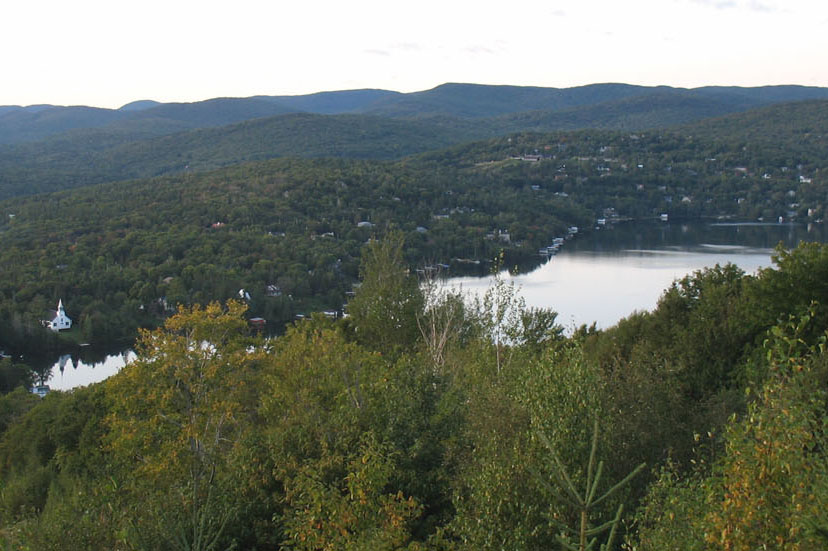
Lake Beauport

The municipality of Lac-Beauport surrounds the homonymous lake. It is bounded to the south by Quebec City, to the north and west by the united townships of Stoneham-et-Tewkesbury and to the east by the municipality of Sainte-Brigitte-de-Laval. Located in the Laurentians massif, the municipality occupies the basin centered on the lake as well as the surrounding hills and mountains.

== History ==
Around 1820, a small cluster of homes was built on the present site of the municipality, named Waterloo Settlement by the English immigrants after the Anglo-Prussian victory at Waterloo. In 1845, the Municipality of St-Dunstan was formed, named after the local parish of Saint-Dunstan-du-Lac-Beauport. It was abolished in 1847, but reestablished as the Parish Municipality of Saint-Dunstan-du-Lac-Beauport in 1855. In common use, it was only known as Lac-Beauport, prompting the town council to officially change the name in 1989.

== Demographics ==
=== Population ===
Canada census – Lac-Beauport community profile

	2021	2016	2011
Population	8,164 (+4.7% from 2016)	7,801 (+6.5% from 2011)	7,281 (+19.7% from 2006)
Land area	61.73 km^{2} (23.83 sq mi)	61.79 km^{2} (23.86 sq mi)	61.27 km^{2} (23.66 sq mi)
Population density	132.2/km^{2} (342/sq mi)	126.2/km^{2} (327/sq mi)	118.8/km^{2} (308/sq mi)
Median age	42.4 (M: 43.2, F: 42.0)	41 (M: 41.7, F: 40.3)	38.6 (M: 39.3, F: 37.9)
Private dwellings	3,201 (total) 3,070 (occupied)	3,031 (total)	2,815 (total)
Median household income	$134,000	$116,832	$102,376

References: 2021 2016 2011

Historical Census Data - Lac-Beauport, Quebec

Year	Pop.	±%
1871	354	—
1881	286	−19.2%
1891	216	−24.5%
1901	228	+5.6%
1911	225	−1.3%
1921	169	−24.9%
1931	173	+2.4%
1941	239	+38.2%

Year	Pop.	±%
1951	542	+126.8%
1956	542	+0.0%
1961	606	+11.8%
1966	860	+41.9%
1971	1,280	+48.8%
1977	2,072	+61.9%
1981	3,285	+58.5%
1986	3,713	+13.0%

Year	Pop.	±%
1991	4,462	+20.2%
1996	5,008	+12.2%
2001	5,519	+10.2%
2006	6,081	+10.2%
2011	7,281	+19.7%
2016	7,801	+7.1%
2021	8,164	+4.7%

Source: Statistics Canada

=== Language ===
Mother tongue (2021):

- English as first language: 2.3%
- French as first language: 95.5%
- English and French as first languages: 1%
- Other as first language: 1%

== See also ==
- List of municipalities in Quebec
