= Lac à l'Épaule =

Lake in Lac-Jacques-Cartier, Quebec, Canada

- Location in Quebec
- Location: Lac-Jacques-Cartier (TNO), La Côte-de-Beaupré Regional County Municipality, Capitale-Nationale
- Coordinates: 47.24778°N 71.24028°W
- Lake type: Natural
- Primary inflows: (clockwise from the mouth) Rivière à l'Épaule, discharge of lac à Noël.
- Primary outflows: Rivière à l'Épaule
- Basin countries: Canada
- Max. length: 2.9 km (1.8 mi)
- Max. width: 0.8 km (0.50 mi)
- Surface elevation: 651 m (2,136 ft)

The lac à l'Épaule (English: shoulder lake) is a freshwater body crossed from north to south by the Rivière à l'Épaule, in Jacques-Cartier National Park. This lake is located entirely in the unorganized territory of Lac-Jacques-Cartier, in the La Côte-de-Beaupré Regional County Municipality, administrative region of Capitale-Nationale, in province of Quebec, in Canada.

The Lac à l'Épaule watershed is mainly served on the east side by the route 175 which links the cities of Quebec and Saguenay; this road goes to 0.25 kilometres (0.16 mi) east of the lake. A secondary road serves the western part of the lake for forestry and recreational tourism activities.

Forestry is the main economic activity in the sector; recreotourism activities, second in particular through the "Camp Devin" which is now administered by the Société des établissements de plein air du Québec.

The surface of Lac à l'Épaule is generally frozen from the beginning of December to the end of March; safe circulation on the ice is generally done from the end of December to the beginning of March.

== Geography ==
Upstream, the "Petit lac à l'Épaule" (English: small lake at the shoulder) is located 4.6 kilometres (2.9 mi) to the northeast, forming the boundary between the Laurentides Wildlife Reserve and Jacques-Cartier National Park. The "Petit lac à l'Épaule" is the source of the rivière à l'Épaule, the current of which crosses southward to "Lac à l'Épaule" over its full length. The second main source of Lac à l'Épaule is the discharge of the "lac à Noël" (English: lake at Christmas) (coming from the southeast).

Lac à l'Épaule has a length of 2.9 kilometres (1.8 mi), a width of 0.8 kilometres (0.50 mi) and its surface is at an altitude of 651 metres (2,136 ft). This lake deep between the mountains is long, with a small bay on the east bank. A dam was built a few decades ago at the exit of the largest of these lakes. The area of the sub-watershed is 87 square kilometres (34 sq mi).

The Lac à l'Épaule is located 6.7 kilometres (4.2 mi) on the west side of the Morency River course and 11.4 kilometres (7.1 mi) on the east side of the course of the Jacques-Cartier River.

From the mouth of Lac à l'Épaule, the current of the rivière à l'Épaule goes down on 17 kilometres (11 mi) towards the southwest to Jacques-Cartier River where it flows at the foot of the Épaule mountain. Then the current descends on generally towards the south by borrowing the current from the Jacques-Cartier River to the northeast bank of the Saint-Laurent river.

== Toponymy ==
The origin of this toponym is very old. Its meaning remains uncertain, however the main hypothesis considered describes that the shoulder (shoulder) could here designate a flat with a fairly gentle slope used to connect two valleys whose level differs. The phenomenon is common in regions that have experienced glaciations.

A report dated 1829 and signed by the surveyor John Adams mentions the "rivière à L'Épaule" and the "Montagne de l'Épaule", while William Ware describes the surroundings of Lac à l'Épaule in 1835. This area was frequented in the 17th century by Jesuits who went, by a path traced by the Innu, to lac Saint-Jean. The plan of the Wendat (Huron) chief Nicholas Vincent, drawn up around 1829, identifies the river under its Wendat name "Hüaonjacaronté".

This sector, on the outskirts of the settlers' settlements, has undergone some attempts to clear it, because abattis were spotted there in 1867. The government then built a shelter there for travelers from Lac-Saint-Jean. Later, a road to Jacques-Cartier Lake. Beginning in 1907, sport fishermen were in turn served by accommodation facilities, to which was later added Camp Devlin. Lac à l'Épaule hosted, in the summer of 1943, Sir Winston Churchill and Franklin Delano Roosevelt, gathered in Quebec for an Allied conference. A larger pavilion, erected by a logging company in 1946, later became a meeting place reserved for government officials. A landmark event in contemporary history took place there in September 1962 and made the expression make, hold a shoulder-to-shoulder famous. A special council of ministers of the Quebec government was there, in fact, to decide to call a referendum election on the theme "Give Hydro-Quebec the mandate to unify and integrate Quebec hydroelectric resources".

The toponym lac à l'Épaule was formalized on December 5, 1968, by the Commission de toponymie du Québec.

== Bibliography ==
- Corporation du bassin de la Jacques-Cartier (2013). Water Master Plan for the Jacques-Cartier Integrated Water Management Zone (PDF)..

== See also ==
- Jacques-Cartier National Park
- La Côte-de-Beaupré Regional County Municipality (MRC)
- Lac-Jacques-Cartier, an unorganized territory
- Rivière à l'Épaule
- Jacques-Cartier River
- List of lakes of Canada
