= Beauport Lake =

Lake in Capitale-Nationale, Quebec, Canada

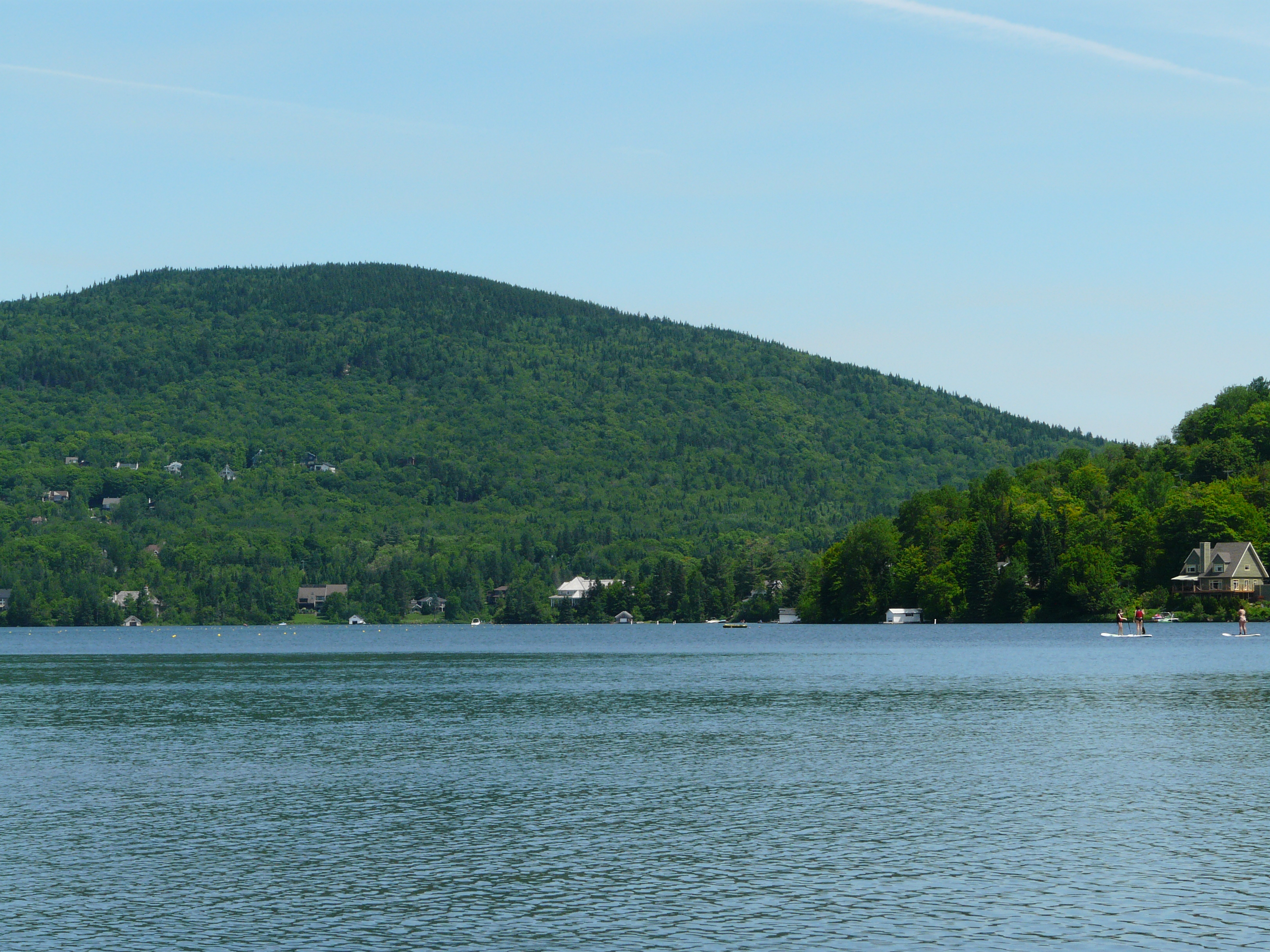
- View of the lake and Mont Tourbillon

- Location within Central Quebec Location within Quebec
- Location: Lac-Beauport, La Jacques-Cartier (MRC), Capitale-Nationale, Quebec, Canada
- Coordinates: 46°57′14″N 71°16′31″W
- Primary inflows: Outlet of Lagueux and Tourbillon lakes, outlet of an unidentified small lake.
- Primary outflows: Jaune River
- Basin countries: Canada
- Max. length: 1.8 km (1.1 mi)
- Max. width: 0.54 km (0.34 mi)
- Surface area: 0.869 km^{2} (0.336 sq mi)
- Average depth: 13 m (43 ft)
- Surface elevation: 266 m (873 ft)
- Settlements: Lac-Beauport

The lac Beauport is a body of water located north of Quebec, surrounded by the municipality of Lac-Beauport, in the La Jacques-Cartier Regional County Municipality, in the region of Capitale-Nationale, in the province of Quebec, in Canada. It covers an area of 0.8 square kilometres (0.31 sq mi), at a maximum depth of 13 meters. The lake outlet flows into the Jaune River.

Lac Beauport is mainly supplied by the outlet of Lagueux and Tourbillon lakes and by the outlet of a small unidentified lake.

Lac Beauport is mainly served by the Chemin du Tour du Lac and some secondary roads for the needs of recreational tourism activities (especially vacationing) and forestry.

The surface of Lac Beauport is generally frozen from the beginning of December to the end of March; safe circulation on the ice is generally done from the end of December to the beginning of March.

== Description ==
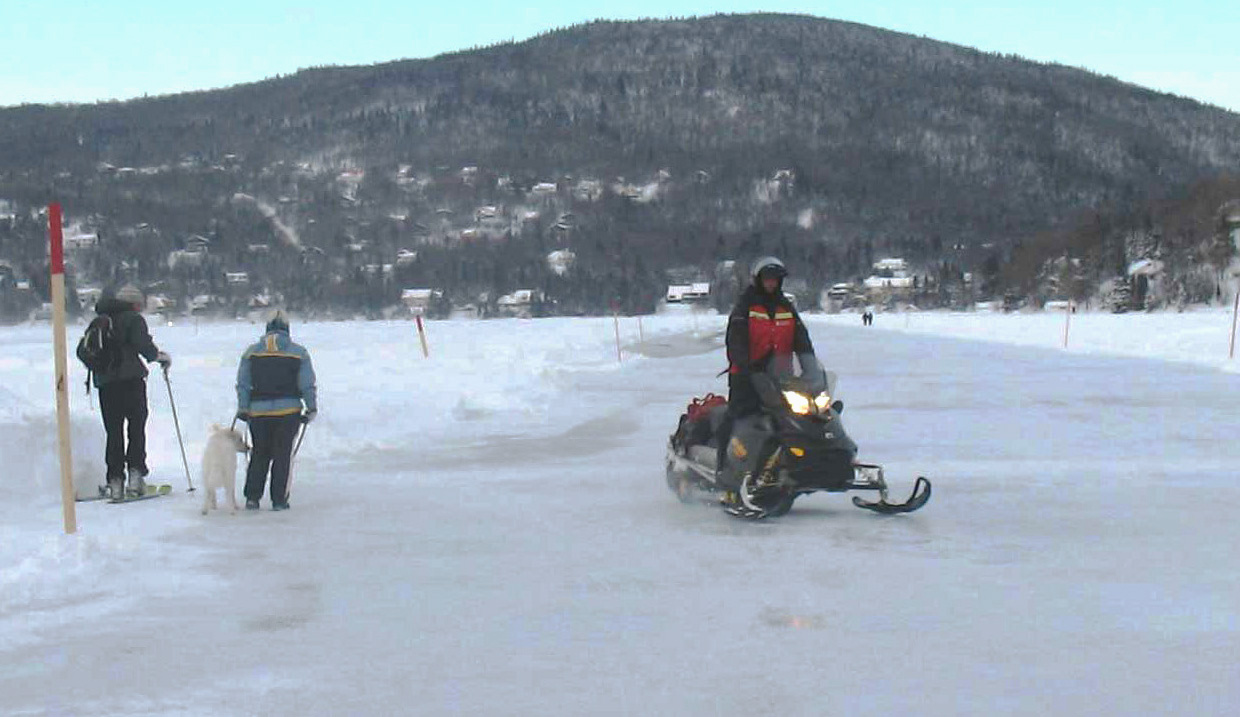
The lake is heavily used, summer and winter. During winter, skating rinks are set up there.

The lake is supplied by four main tributaries, two of which are intermittent. It then pours into the Jaune River. Between the lake and the river, a small dam controls the level of the lake.

Concentrations of phosphorus increased to a maximum in 1999 (19 mg/L) and then fell again in 2005 (7 mg/L). Transparency decreased in the early 2000s before returning in 2009 to a level similar to that of 1978. In recent years, the water in Lake Beauport was generally of very good quality and the parameters measured meet the quality criteria for the practice of recreational activities and the preservation of aquatic life, except for the level of aluminum, exceeding standards in 1999.

Summer and winter, the lake is very busy with human activity. The shores of the lake are occupied and privatized and the only public access to the lake is the Municipal Nautical Club of Lac-Beauport. The main attractions are swimming, fishing for bass and speckled trout and boating. In winter, the frozen surface of the lake hosts the Quebec Pond hockey Championship.

== See also ==
- La Jacques-Cartier Regional County Municipality
- Lac-Beauport, a municipality
- Jaune River
- Saint-Charles River

=== External links ===
- Organization of the watersheds of the Capital - Lac Beauport
