= Lake Saint-Charles =

Lake in Quebec, Canada

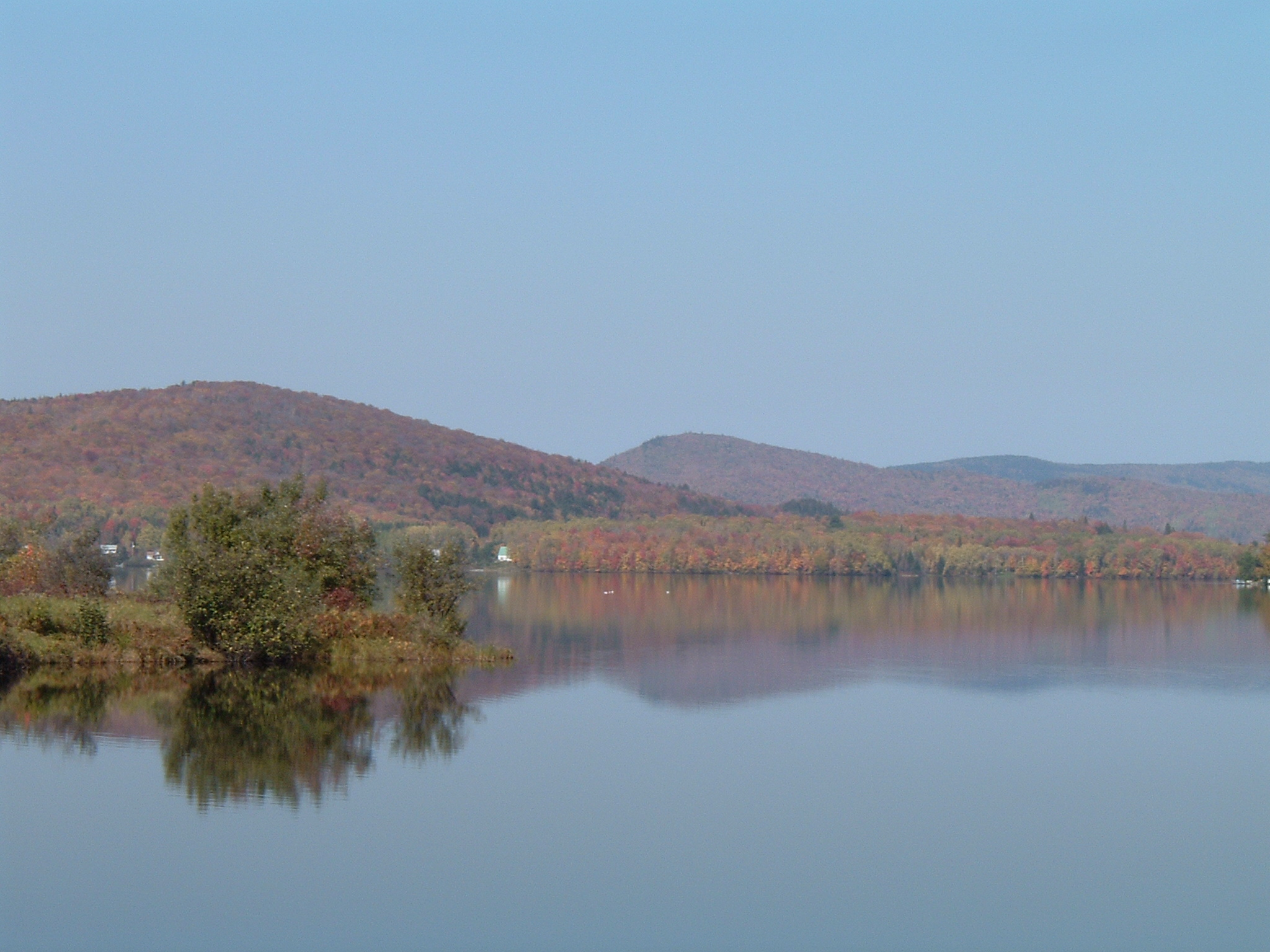

- Location within Quebec City
- Location: Capitale-Nationale, Quebec
- Coordinates: 46°56′28″N 71°23′14″W
- Type: Dam lake
- Primary inflows: Courte Botte River, Talbot River, Lac Delage outflow, Huron River.
- Primary outflows: Saint-Charles River
- Catchment area: 167.7 km^{2} (64.7 sq mi)
- Basin countries: Canada
- Max. length: 5.5 km^{2} (2.1 sq mi)
- Max. width: 1.2 km^{2} (0.46 sq mi)
- Surface area: 3.6 km^{2} (1.4 sq mi)
- Max. depth: 16.5 m (54 ft)
- Water volume: 14,810,000 m^{3} (523,000,000 cu ft)
- Surface elevation: 150.42 m (493.5 ft)
- Settlements: Quebec City, Stoneham-et-Tewkesbury

Lake Saint-Charles (French: Lac Saint-Charles, pronounced [lak sɛ̃ ʃaʁl]) is a lake located in the Capitale-Nationale region of Quebec, Canada. It is located partially within the Quebec City borough of La Haute-Saint-Charles (section West) and partially within the united township municipality of Stoneham-et-Tewkesbury (section East).

Lake Saint-Charles is the source of the Saint-Charles River. Located less than 20 minutes from downtown Quebec City, it is an important natural habitat to Quebec City area residents. Lac-Delage and the borough of Charlesbourg also administer a portion of its drainage basin.

Lac Saint-Charles is served on the east side mainly by the Grande Ligne road and on the west side by the Lac-Saint-Charles road for the needs of recreational tourism and forestry.

The surface of Lake Saint-Charles is generally frozen from the beginning of December to the end of March; safe circulation on the ice is generally done from the end of December to the beginning of March.

== Geography ==
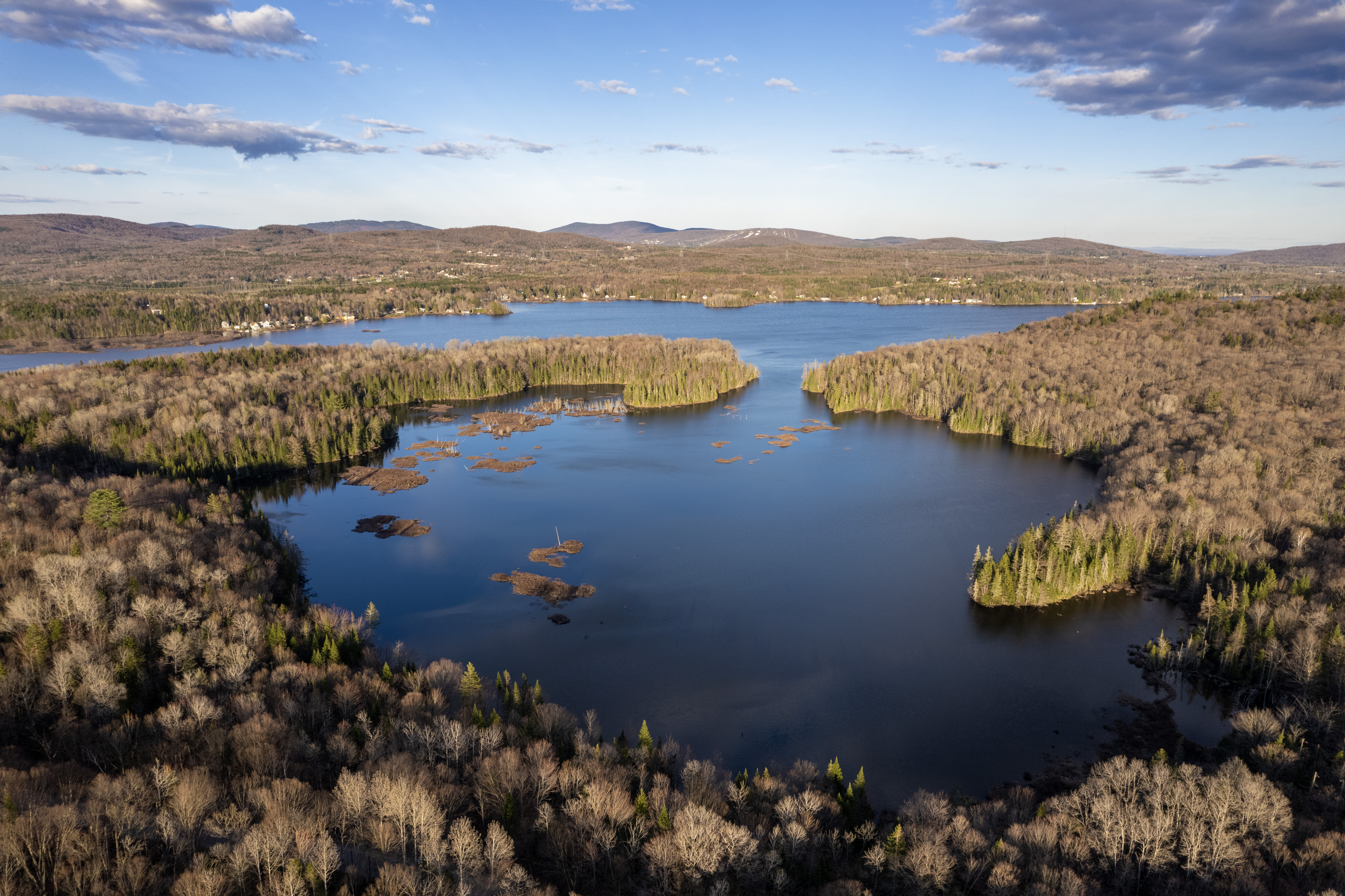
Bird's eye-view of the lake

The town of Quebec, by the borough of La Haute-Saint-Charles, and the united townships of Stoneham-et-Tewkesbury, are the municipalities bordering the lake. The Lac-Delage and the borough of Charlesbourg also administers part of its watershed.

The dam Cyrille-Delage raises the level of Lake Saint-Charles because it constitutes the reservoir for the water supply of the drinking water treatment plant in the city of Quebec. Erected at the exit of the lake in 1934, it was replaced in 1948 and the lake raised again. As a result of this dam, the surrounding lowlands were submerged over widths up to 50 metres (160 ft). Today, the lake level is higher than it was originally about 2 metres (6 ft 7 in). This impoundment therefore upset the physical and biological balance by modifying the morphometry of the lake, bringing a massive supply of sediment and periodically creating a significant deficit in oxygen over half of the water column. A new problem appeared at Lake Saint-Charles in the fall of 2006 when the presence of blue algae, or cyanobacteria, was detected. The causes of this phenomenon are currently being studied, but actions have already been taken to limit phosphorus supplies.

Lake Saint-Charles has good recreational tourism potential. Guided hikes in rabaska are offered to discover the lake and many people take advantage of it every year. The rental of boats (canoes, kayaks, rowboats, pedal boats) is also possible, whether for hiking or for fishing northern pike. In addition, a few sites near the lake have strong archaeological potential, notably in the Charles-Talbot bay sector.

The lake is the starting point of the Linear park of the Saint-Charles and Berger rivers.

== Features ==
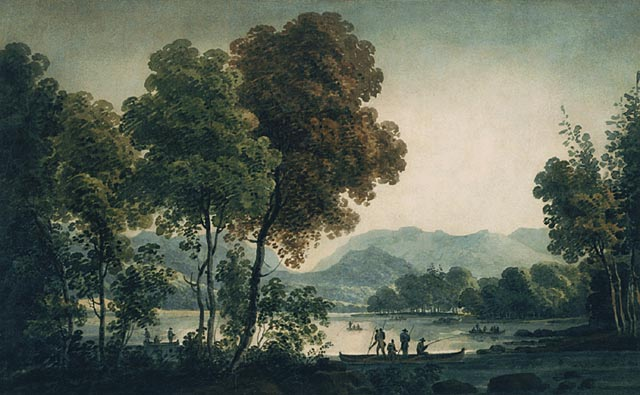
The Saint-Charles Lake circa 1800 by George Heriot.

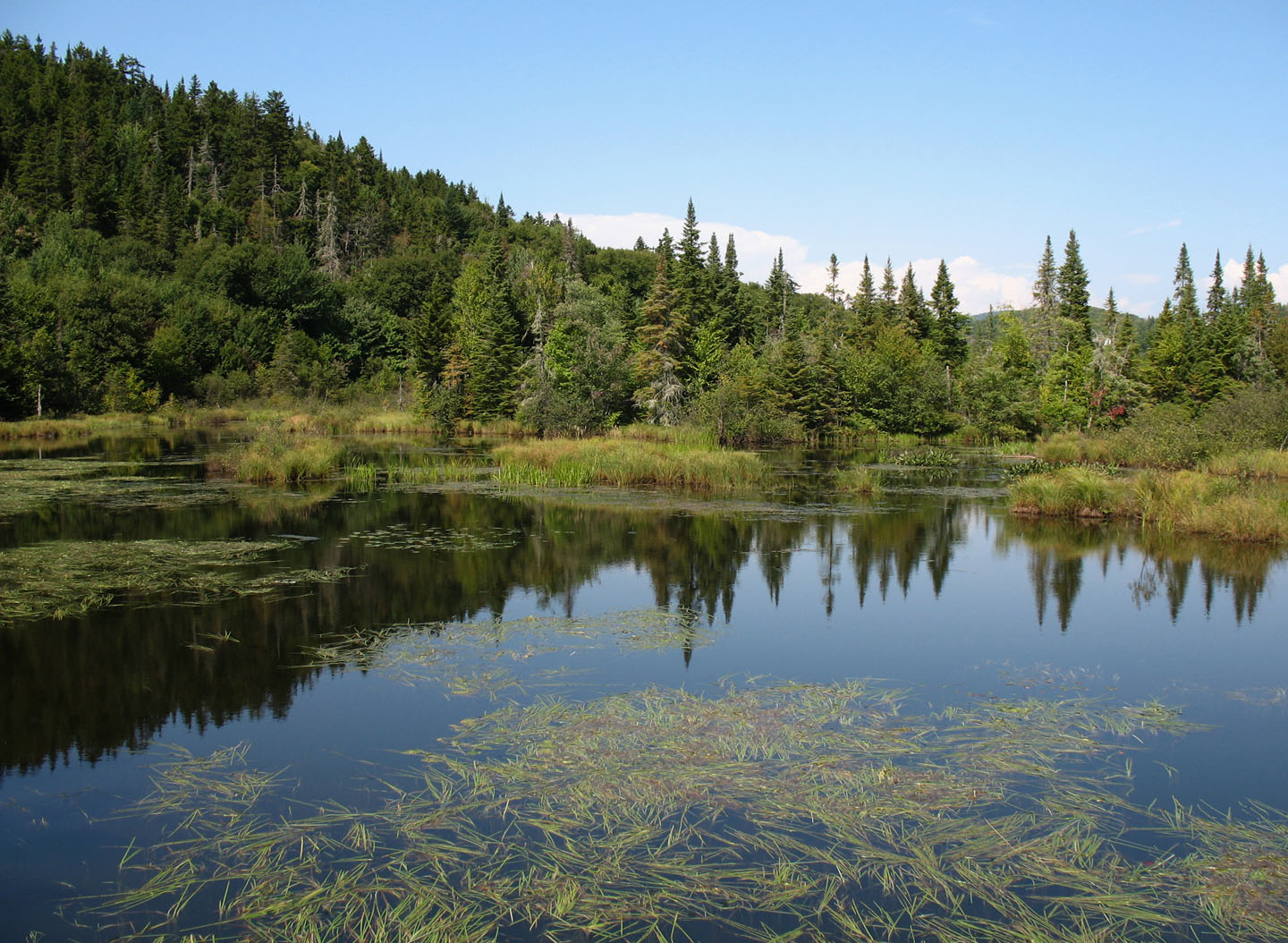
Nature reserve of Marais-du-Nord.

- Shape: Lake Saint-Charles has two pools (north and south) giving it a shape of "8"
- Lake area: 3.6 square kilometres (1.4 sq mi)
- Maximum length: 5.5 kilometres (3.4 mi) in a north–south axis
- Maximum depth: 17.5 metres (57 ft) (in its northern basin)
- Volume: 15 of cubic meters
- Area of the watershed: 170 square kilometres (66 sq mi)

== Tributaries ==
- rivière des Hurons
- Discharge from lac Delage
- Talbot Creek
- Short-boot stream

== See also ==
- Saint-Charles River
