= Stoneham-et-Tewkesbury =

- United township municipality
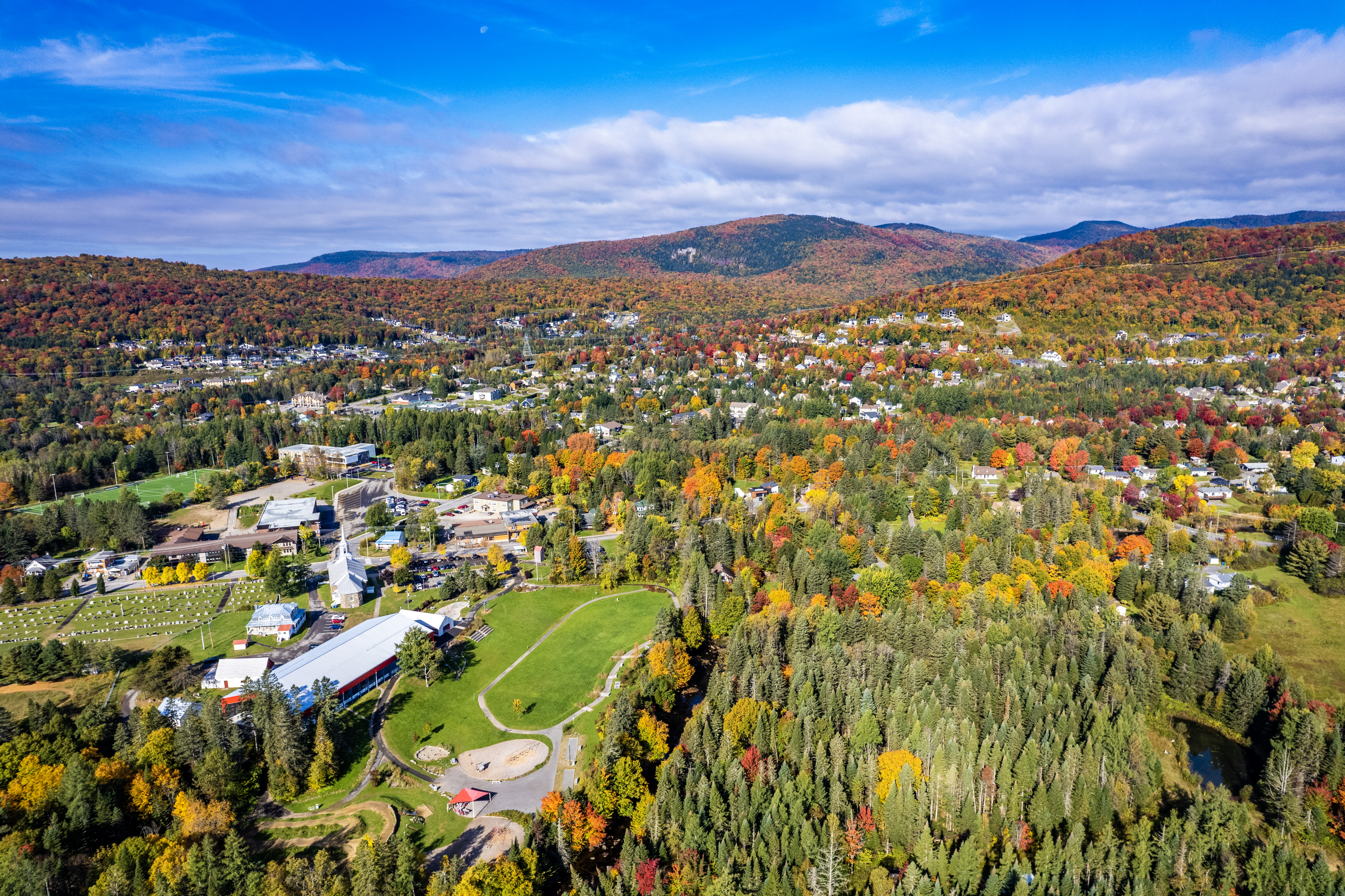

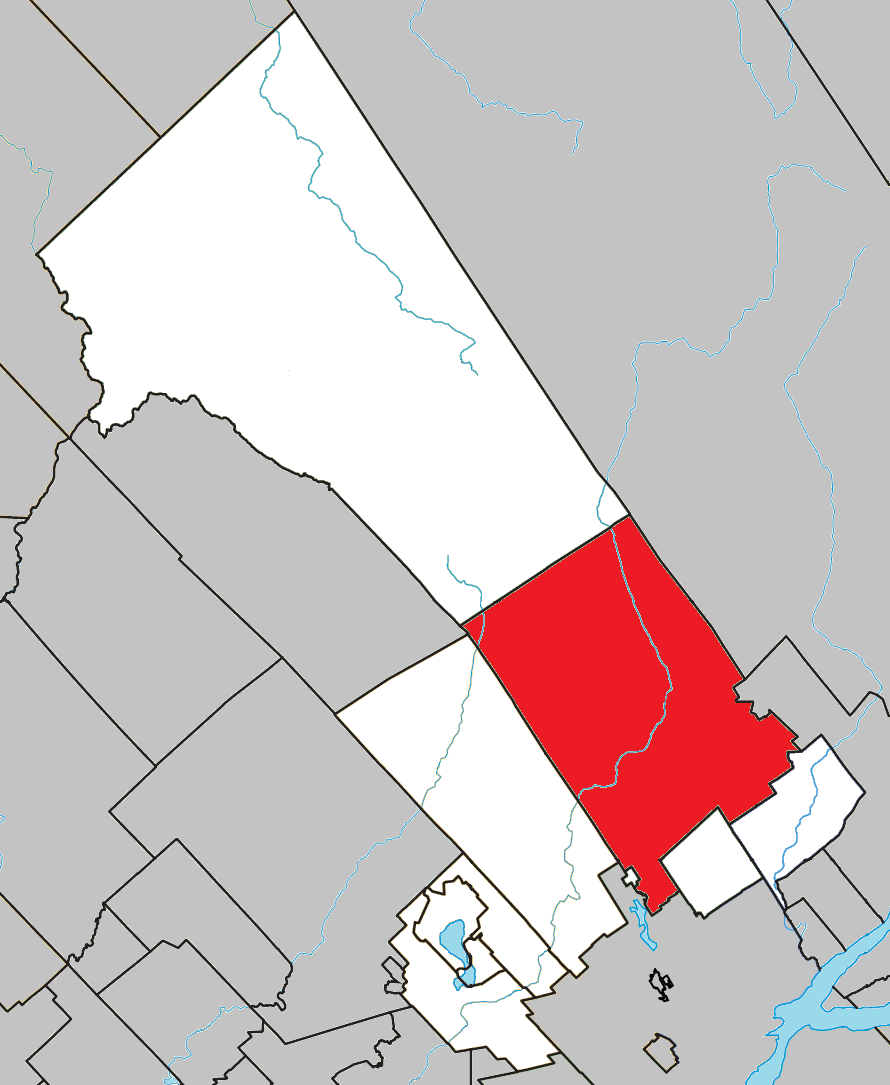
- Location within La Jacques-Cartier RCM

- Location in central Quebec
- Coordinates: 47°10′N 71°26′W
- Country: Canada
- Province: Quebec
- Region: Capitale-Nationale
- RCM: La Jacques-Cartier
- Settled: 1815
- Constituted: July 1, 1855

Government
  - Mayor: Sébastien Couture
  - Fed. riding: Saint-Augustin—Portneuf—Jacques-Cartier
  - Prov. riding: Chauveau

Area
  - Total: 686.23 km^{2} (264.95 sq mi)
  - Land: 670.03 km^{2} (258.70 sq mi)

Population (2021)
  - Total: 9,682
  - Density: 14.5/km^{2} (38/sq mi)
  - Pop (2016-21): ▲15.8%
  - Dwellings: 4,421
- Time zone: UTC−5 (EST)
  - Summer (DST): UTC−4 (EDT)
- Postal code(s): G3C
- Area codes: 418, 581
- Highways A-73: R-175 R-371
- Website: www.villestoneham.com

Stoneham Mountain Resort

Stoneham-et-Tewkesbury is a united township municipality in the Canadian province of Quebec, located in the regional county municipality of La Jacques-Cartier north of Quebec City. Its main attraction is the Stoneham Mountain Resort.

The large territory of the municipality is only developed and inhabited in the south, where the population centres of Saint-Adolphe, Stoneham, and Tewkesbury are located. Large portions of the north are included in the Jacques-Cartier National Park and the Laurentides Wildlife Reserve. The terrain is hilly, part of the Laurentian Mountains, and crossed by the Jacques-Cartier, upper Sainte-Anne, and Hurons Rivers. Some of the more notable lakes are Beaumont, Saint-Vincent, and Saint-Guillaume.

== History ==
In 1792, Philip Toosey was granted some 70 acres (280,000 m^{2}) of land that formed the beginning of the village that he named Stoneham after Stonham Aspal, his native village in Suffolk, England. The same year, the toponyms of the geographic townships of Stoneham and Tewkesbury appeared. Tewkesbury may be attributed to Kenelm Chandler, who was born in Tewkesbury, England, arrived in 1764 and was granted 9713 hectares of land in Stoneham in 1800.

The first influx of Irish, English, and Scottish settlers came in 1815. By 1831, its population had passed 175. In 1845, the Stoneham Municipality was formed and abolished in 1847. In 1850, the Parish of Saint-Edmond-de-Stoneham was formed, named after Edmund Rich of Canterbury (1170–1240). The Stoneham Post Office opened in 1854. A year later, on July 1, the United Township Municipality of Stoneham-et-Tewkesbury was established, populated by about 25 families.

In 1871, its population had grown to 640 (360 in Stoneham Township and 280 in Tewkesbury Township). In 1880, the Tewkesbury Post Office opened (it closed in 1963). The completion of the railroad, owned by the St. Charles and Huron River Railway Company, between Stoneham-et-Tewkesbury and Loretteville in 1912 led to intensive logging in the area. Timber was floated down the Hurons River to Stoneham from where it was brought by rail to Quebec City. The railway was also used to transport cargo and wood pulp of the Brown Corporation and the Donnacona Paper Company. By 1920, the place had become an important commercial centre of northern Quebec.

In 1973, the neighbouring municipality of Saint-Adolphe was annexed into Stoneham-et-Tewkesbury, making it one of the largest municipalities in Quebec at that time.

== Demographics ==
Historical Census Data - Stoneham-et-Tewkesbury, Quebec

Year	Pop.	±%
1831	175	—
1871	662	+278.3%
1881	820	+23.9%
1891	727	−11.3%
1901	1,168	+60.7%
1911	735	−37.1%
1921	885	+20.4%
1931	874	−1.2%
1941	1,038	+18.8%

Year	Pop.	±%
1951	1,033	−0.5%
1956	1,036	+0.3%
1961*	1,208	+16.6%
1966	1,322	+9.4%
1971	1,691	+27.9%
1976	2,432	+43.8%
1981	3,513	+44.4%
1986	3,745	+6.6%
1991	4,384	+17.1%

Year	Pop.	±%
1991	4,384	+0.0%
1996	4,842	+10.4%
2001	5,266	+8.8%
2006	5,866	+11.4%
2011	7,106	+21.1%
2016	8,359	+17.6%
2021	9,682	+15.8%

(*) The Town of Lac-Delage separated from Stoneham-et-Tewkesbury
Source: Statistics Canada

In the 2021 Census of Population conducted by Statistics Canada, Stoneham-et-Tewkesbury had a population of 9,682 living in 3,862 of its 4,421 total private dwellings, a change of 15.8% from its 2016 population of 8,359. With a land area of 670.03 km^{2} (258.70 sq mi), it had a population density of 14.5/km^{2} (37.4/sq mi) in 2021.

Private dwellings occupied by usual residents: 3,862 (total dwellings: 4,421)

Mother tongue (2021):

- English as first language: 1.7%
- French as first language: 95.5%
- English and French as first language: 1.3%
- Other as first language: 1.1%

== Government ==
Stoneham-et-Tewkesbury forms part of the federal electoral district of Saint-Augustin—Portneuf—Jacques-Cartier and has been represented by Joël Godin of the Conservative Party since 2015. Provincially, Stoneham-et-Tewkesbury is part of the Chauveau electoral district and is represented by Sylvain Lévesque of the Coalition Avenir Québec since 2018.

Stoneham-et-Tewkesbury federal election results
Year	Liberal		Conservative		Bloc Québécois		New Democratic		Green	
2021	15%	733	47%	2,266	26%	1,262	6%	302	0%	0
2019	19%	873	40%	1,852	25%	1,163	7%	306	6%	258

Stoneham-et-Tewkesbury provincial election results
Year	CAQ		Liberal		QC solidaire		Parti Québécois	
2018	46%	2,194	20%	957	13%	624	9%	442
2014	54%	2,376	25%	1,124	5%	205	14%	603

=== List of mayors ===
- Edmond Bureau, 1938-1940
- John Payne, 1940-1944
- Philppe Plamondon 1944-1947
- John Payne, 1947-1948
- Sydney McCune, 1948-1975
- Jean-Guy Vézina, 1975-1976
- Raymond Labrecque, 1976-1980
- Rodrigue Harvey, 1980-1990
- Jacques Nolin, 1990-1994
- Dany Barbeau, 1994-2005
- Gaétane G. St-Laurent, 2005-2009
- Robert Miller, 2009-2017
- Claude Lebel, 2017–2021
- Sébastien Couture, 2021–present

== See also ==
- List of united township municipalities in Quebec
