= Mark Takeshi McGregor =

Canadian flutist

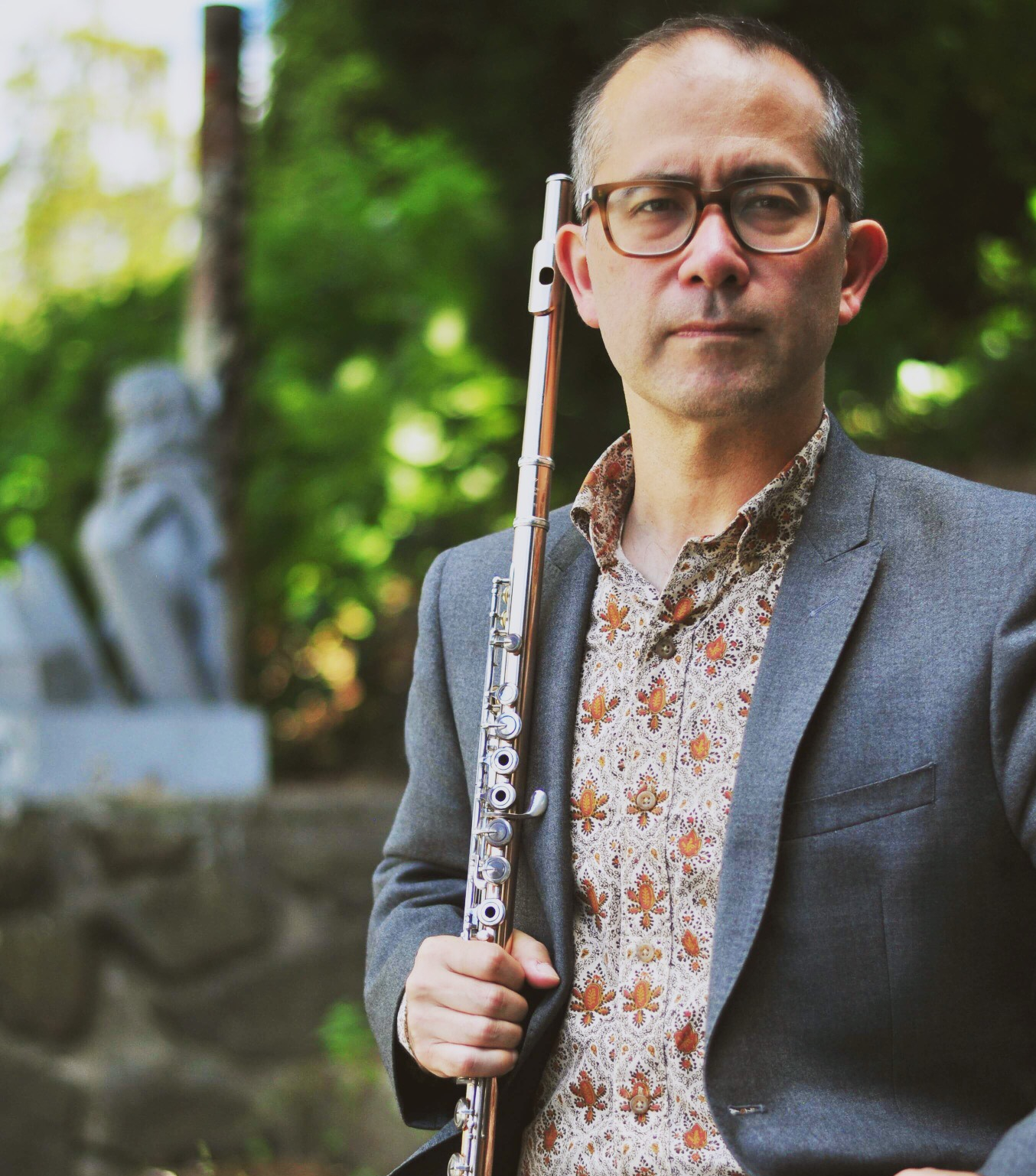

Background information
- Born: December 20, 1972 (age 52); Richmond, British Columbia
- Occupation(s): flutist, visual artist

Mark Takeshi McGregor is a Canadian flutist, educator, producer, curator, and visual artist.

== Early life and education ==
McGregor was born in Richmond, British Columbia and grew up in North Delta, British Columbia. He received his Bachelor of Music (BM) degree from the University of British Columbia in 1995; studied at the Conservatoire de musique du Québec à Montréal in 1997; received a Master of Music (MM) from the University of Sydney, Australia, where he studied with Margaret Crawford and Richard Toop; (thesis topic: Evolution of extended techniques in the flute music of Brian Ferneyhough); and Doctorate of Musical Arts (DMA) from the University of British Columbia in 2012, where his thesis topic was Of Instrumental Value: Composer-performer collaboration in the creation of avant-garde flute music, and notably includes the first overview of the performance career of Severino Gazzelloni written in the English language, as well as an in-depth interview with renowned Canadian flutist Robert Aitken and writings about McGregor's collaborations with three contemporary Canadian composers.

== Career ==
=== Artistic director, curator, and producer ===
In 2001, Jordan Nobles and Mark Takeshi McGregor co-founded of Vancouver's Redshift Music Society, a non-profit organization that commissions and performs new works by Canadian and international composers, often in unconventional venues. McGregor was co-artistic director along with Nobles from 2005 to 2012 and helped launch the Redshift Records label, which released its first album in 2007. McGregor has been featured on, and/or produced, a number of their 120+ releases, which feature the music of contemporary Canadian and international composers.

McGregor was the Artistic Director of Powell Street Festival Society in Vancouver, Canada from 2015 to 2016. In 2021 he succeeded S.D. Holman as artistic and executive director of the Pride in Art Society, which produces the Queer Arts Festival and SUM gallery in Vancouver. In this capacity he has curated visual art exhibitions by SD Holman (Pas-à-pas; not intent on arriving, 2022), Rojina Farrokhnejad (Gods & Monsters, 2023), and Preston Buffalo (Go Home Yuppie Scum, 2024), as well as multiple events for the annually occurring Queer Arts Festival.

=== Performer ===
Mark Takeshi McGregor has premiered flute concertos by Gordon Fitzell, Anna Höstman, James Beckwith Maxwell, Piotr Grella-Mozejko, Farshid Samandari, and Leslie Uyeda, and has commissioned and premiered dozens of solo and chamber music works by contemporary Canadian and international composers, including Dániel Péter Biró, Jennifer Butler, Dorothy Chang, André Cormier, Michael Finnissy, Patrick Giguère, Yota Kobayashi, Chris Kovarik, Emilie LeBel, Nicole Lizée, Simon Martin, Cassandra Miller, Jocelyn Morlock, Gregory Lee Newsome, Jordan Nobles, Anders Nordentoft, James O’Callaghan, Michael Oesterle, Nova Pon, Marci Rabe, Benton Roark, Jeffrey Ryan, Alfredo Santa Ana, Rodney Sharman, Paul Steenhuisen, Edward Top, Hiroki Tsurumoto, and Owen Underhill. He is most frequently heard in concert as a soloist, with Rachel Kiyo Iwaasa as the Tiresias Duo, with guitarist Adrian Verdejo as the McGregor-Verdejo Duo, and as flutist for the Victoria-based new music ensemble, Aventa.

=== Educator ===
Until 2021 McGregor was instructor of flute at the Vancouver Symphony Orchestra (VSO) School of Music, the Vancouver Academy of Music, and Vancouver Community College. He served as sessional faculty (flute) at the University of Victoria in 2016.

== Selected discography (as performer) ==
- Delicate Fires, Redshift Records TK421 (2007/2012) (with Rachel Kiyo Iwaasa, piano, as Tiresias Duo)
- Different Stones, Redshift Records TK422 (2009)
- Trade Winds, Redshift Records TK428 (2013) (with Rachel Kiyo Iwaasa, piano, as Tiresias Duo)
- Sins and Fantasies, Redshift Records TK430 (2013)
- Immersion, Redshift Records TK441 (2016)
- Rosetta Stone, Redshift Records TK461 (2018)
- Lutalica, Redshift Records TK468 (2019)
- Scratches of the Wind, Redshift Records TK500 (2021)
- Starts and Stops, Redshift Records TK521 (2023)
- André Cormier: —tous facteurs étant égaux, Redshift Records TK549 (2024)

== Selected discography (as producer) ==
- Delicate Fires, Redshift Records TK421 (2007/2012) (co-producer with Rachel Kiyo Iwaasa)
- Different Stones, Redshift Records TK422 (2009)
- Cosmophony, Redshift Records TK423 (2010) (co-producer with Rachel Kiyo Iwaasa)
- Trade Winds, Redshift Records TK428 (2013) (co-producer with Emma Lain Fernandez, David Simpson, and Rachel Kiyo Iwaasa)
- Sins and Fantasies, Redshift Records TK430 (2013) (co-produced with Don Harder)
- Concentric Lines, Redshift Records TK450 (2017)
- Lutalica, Redshift Records TK468 (2019)
- Alfredo Santa Ana – Before the World Sleeps, Redshift Records TK555 (2024)

== Awards and nominations ==
=== Friends of Canadian Music Award ===
- 2021 Recipient

=== Western Canadian Music Awards ===
Classical Artist of the Year

- Won: Lutalica (2020)

Classical Recording of the Year

- Nominated: Delicate Fires (2008)
- Nominated: Different Stones (2010)
- Nominated: Sins and Fantasies (2015)
