= Keith Hamel =

Canadian composer, software designer, & professor of music (born 1956)

- Born: 1956 (age 69–70); Morden, Manitoba, Canada
- Education: Royal Conservatory of Music, Toronto
- Occupations: Composer, academic

Keith Hamel (born 1956 in Morden, Manitoba, Canada) is a composer, software designer, and professor of music. His music consists of orchestral, chamber, solo, and vocal music, often focussing on live electronics and interactivity between acoustic instruments and the computer.

== Education ==
Keith Hamel studied at the Royal Conservatory of Music in Toronto, and holds a Bachelor of Music degree from Queen's University (Kingston, Ontario, 1981), and A.M. and PhD degrees from Harvard University (1984, 1985). Between 1981 and 1984, he also studied Computer Music at the Massachusetts Institute of Technology, under the supervision of Barry Vercoe. Hamel also received composition instruction from Istvan Anhalt, Donald Martino, Peter Maxwell Davies, Earl Kim and Leon Kirchner. He was a finalist in the 1986 CBC Young Composers Competition (percussion category), and also received four awards in the P.R.O. Canada Young Composers Competition.

== Career ==
Hamel has been on the faculty at the UBC School of Music since 1987, and has been a full professor since 1997. He is also an Associate Researcher at the Institute for Computing, Information and Cognitive Systems (ICICS), a Researcher at the Media Graphics Interdisciplinary Centre (MAGIC), and Director of the UBC Computer Music Studio.

Keith Hamel has been a visiting lecturer at Stony Brook University, Queen's University, the University of Western Ontario, Simon Fraser University, the Banff School of Fine Arts, the University of California, Santa Barbara, the University of Washington School of Music, York University, IRCAM, and several other academic institutions.

== List of works ==
=== Orchestra and large ensemble ===
- Quadrivium for Orchestra (1983) (15 min.)
- Paraphrases for chamber orchestra (1993) (8 min.)
- Overdrive for orchestra (1998) (10 min.)
- Wizard for chamber orchestra (2010) (5 min.)

=== Chamber ensembles ===
- Obsessions 1 for chamber sextet (1984) (17 min.)
- Obsessions 2 for string quartet (1985) (17 min.)
- Paraphrases for fl., cl., horn, fortepiano, timpani, violin, and cello (1990) (8 min.)
- Refraction for clarinet, violin, and piano (1991) (10 min.)
- Each Life Converges To Some Centre... for violin and piano (1992) (7 min.)
- Crossfade for flute, clarinet, violin, piano, and percussion (1994) (3 min.)
- Wings of Mercury for fl., ob., cl., perc., pno., vn., vc. and D.B. (1997) (12 min.)
- Kolokochiki for two piano and two percussion (2002) (12 min.)
- Adawura for clarinet, violin, cello, piano and percussion (2003) (12 min.)

=== Chamber ensemble with interactive electronics ===
- Land of Shades for six singers and computer-generated tape (1982) (9 min.)
- Obsessions III for tape and chamber ensemble (1987) (10 min.)
- Ca-Non for flute/alto flute, MIDI piano, percussion, and interactive electronics
- Faded Memories, Faded Jeans for cl., vc., MIDI piano, and perc. (1995) (20 min.)
- Off-ramp for elec. gtr, chamber ens., and interactive electronics (2007) (14 min.)
- Les Cloches for chamber orchestra and interactive electronics (2011) (11 min.)

=== Solo instruments with interactive electronics ===
- Symposium II for perc. and computer tape (1985; revised 1992)
- Thrust for MIDI grand piano and electronics (1989) (18 min.)
- WindoW for alto saxophone and interactive electronics (1990) (12 min.)
- Obsessed Again... for bassoon and interactive electronics (1992) (15 min.)
- Traces for clarinet and interactive electronics (1995)
- Krishna’s Flute for flute and interactive electronics (2004) (15 min.)
- Touch for piano and interactive electronics (2012) (15 min.)
- Full Circle for trombone and interactive electronics (2014) (14 min.)

=== Vocal and choral ===
- Salem, 1692 for women's choir (1993) (10 min.)
- Lullaby for women's choir (1999) (5 min.)
- deep in the heart is where we are one for choir (2002) (7 min.)
- Her Eyes in Sleep for ATTB (2005) (3 min.)

== Selected performers ==
Ensemble Contemporain, Vancouver Symphony Orchestra, Vancouver New Music Ensemble, Elektra Women's Choir, ARRAYMUSIC, New Music Concerts, musica intima, Hammerhead Consort, Standing Wave, Hard Rubber Orchestra, Robert Silverman, Robert Cram, Robert Aitken, Chenoa Anderson, Mark McGregor, Paolo Bortolussi, Corey Hamm, The Nu:BC Collective, Jesse Read, Jean-Guy Boisvert, Julia Nolan, Douglas Finch and François Houle.

== Affiliations ==
Vice President, International Society for Contemporary Music (ISCM) (2003–2007) President, Canadian Music Centre (2002–2006) Board Member, Canadian League of Composers (1995–2005) Published by Editions Musicales Européenes (Paris), Cypress Editions (Vancouver) Keith Hamel is an Associate Composer of the Canadian Music Centre, and a member of the Canadian League of Composers.

AMP represents the music of Paul Steenhuisen, Howard Bashaw, Keith Hamel, Bob Pritchard, James Harley, André Ristic, Gordon Fitzell, and Aaron Gervais.

== Software development ==
- Notewriter music notation software (1988–2007)
- NoteAbility Pro music notation software (1996–present)
- UBC Toolbox Processing modules for Max/MSP (2005–present)
- IMuSE, the Integrated Multimodal Score-following Environment

== Notable students ==
Hamel has been principal supervisor of several students who have proceeded to professional careers in music. These include Richard Covey, Gordon Fitzell, Brent Lee, Jocelyn Morlock, Bob Pritchard and Paul Steenhuisen.
