= Gordon Fitzell =

Canadian composer

Gordon Fitzell (born 1968) is a composer, concert organizer, and professor of music. His catalog consists of solo, chamber, and electroacoustic music, including open and improvisatory works.

== Biography ==
Born and raised in Portage la Prairie, Manitoba, Canada, Gordon Fitzell earned a dual-emphasis PhD in Music Theory and Composition from the University of British Columbia (studies with Keith Hamel and John Roeder); a Master of Music degree from the University of Alberta (studies with Howard Bashaw and Malcolm Forsyth); and a Bachelor of Music degree from Brandon University (studies with Kenneth Nichols). As a student, he attended the Darmstadt Internationale Ferienkurse für Neue Music, the Yale Summer School, June in Buffalo, the Arraymusic Young Composers Workshop, and the Banff Centre. He has attended masterclasses and short-term instruction with Beat Furrer, Salvatore Sciarrino, Jukka Tiensuu, Aaron Jay Kernis, Roger Reynolds, Martin Bresnick, Joan Tower, Linda Bouchard, and Robert J. Rosen.

== Career ==
Fitzell's music has been performed at major international festivals including the Darmstädter Ferienkurse (Germany), Festival Synthèse Bourges (France), the ISCM World New Music Days (Sweden), the International Sound Art Festival (Mexico), and the Tanglewood Music Festival (USA). He has received acknowledgements and awards for his compositions from various organizations, including CBC Radio, the SOCAN Foundation, Vancouver New Music, and the National Academy of Recording Arts and Sciences (USA).

In 2008 the eighth blackbird album strange imaginary animals, which features two of Fitzell's compositions, garnered two Grammy Awards. Fitzell also appears on the album as co-producer and live electronics artist, and in 2006 performed with the group on two CD release concerts at The Kitchen in New York. In 2009 his chamber work violence was performed at the International Society for Contemporary Music (ISCM) World New Music Days in Sweden by Norway's BIT20 Ensemble, under the direction of Dutch conductor/composer/pianist Reinbert de Leeuw. In 2010 Fitzell was the guest composer of the Cluster Festival of New Music and Integrated Arts.

Fitzell is a regular curator of sound art events, ranging from chamber music concerts to media art installations. Since 2009 he has been an artistic director of Groundswell, Winnipeg's premiere new music series. Gordon Fitzell is assistant professor of Music Theory and Composition at the University of Manitoba, where he also leads the XIE (eXperimental Improv Ensemble).

== List of Works ==
SOLO

- kamelyin (2007) [15’00] For solo piano
- Metanoia Nervosa (2006) [13’00] For solo percussion
- Orb of the Sun (1999) [8’30] For tenor saxophone; optional live electronics

SOLO WITH LIVE ELECTRONICS

- Watermelon Soup (2007) [variable duration] For one or more players (open, mixed media score)
- The Z Scherzo (2000) [11'00] For electric guitar and live multitrack recording
- Orb of the Sun (1999) [8’30] For tenor saxophone; optional live electronics

CHAMBER

- Entropy (2010) [10'00] For piano ten hands
- Pangaea Ultima (2010) [c. 10’00] For instrumental sextet (clarinet/bass clarinet, violin, electric guitar, double bass, piano, percussion)
- Magister Ludi (2009) [12’00] For solo cello and flute octet (2 piccolos, 2 flutes, 2 alto flutes, 2 bass flutes)
- Metropolis (2007) [8’00] For saxophone and piano; optional live electronics
- Watermelon Soup (2007) [variable duration] For one or more players (open, mixed media score)
- LUCID (2005) [10’10] For instrumental sextet (flute/piccolo, clarinet/bass clarinet, violin, cello, piano, percussion)
- violence (2001) [9’00] For instrumental sextet (flute/piccolo, clarinet/bass clarinet, violin, cello, piano, percussion)
- Flux (2000) [12’45] For large chamber ensemble (flute/piccolo, clarinet/bass clarinet, bassoon, horn, trombone, piano/auxiliary percussion, violin, cello, bass)
- Rat Bastard (1999) [6'30] For piano, electric guitar, cello and drum set; all amplified
- Art (1999) [9’30] For violin and piano
- Six Bagatelles (1998) [7'00] For woodwind quintet

CHAMBER WITH LIVE ELECTRONICS

- Metropolis (2007) [8’00] For saxophone and piano; optional live electronics
- Watermelon Soup (2007) [variable duration] For one or more players (open, mixed media score)
- airports (2007) [variable duration] For acoustic instrument, live electronics, dance and projected images
- Cartographia (2007) [variable duration] For improvisatory chamber ensemble with projected images
- evanescence (2001/2006) [11’30] For instrumental sextet (flute/piccolo, clarinet/bass clarinet, violin, cello, piano, percussion) and live electronics
- clatter (2003) [17'00] A collection of four works for subsets of a large chamber ensemble; intended for simultaneous, overlapping performance:
- Bird's Nest Pudding (2003) [4'30] For large chamber ensemble
- Blood on the Saddle (2003) [1'40] For double bass and percussion
- rattlebox (2003) [2'10] For string quartet
- wormhole (2003) [5'00] For two singers and live electronics

OPEN AND IMPROVISATORY

- Watermelon Soup (2007) [variable duration] For one or more players (open, mixed media score)
- airports (2007) [variable duration] For acoustic instrument and live electronics, with projected images
- Cartographia (2007) [variable duration] For improvisatory chamber ensemble with projected images
- LUCID (2005) [10’10] For instrumental sextet (flute/piccolo, clarinet/bass clarinet, violin, cello, piano, percussion)
- clatter (2003) [17'00] A collection of four works for subsets of a large chamber ensemble; intended for simultaneous, overlapping performance:
- Bird's Nest Pudding (2003) [4'30] For large chamber ensemble
- Blood on the Saddle (2003) [1'40] For double bass and percussion
- rattlebox (2003) [2'10] For string quartet
- wormhole (2003) [5'00] For two singers and live electronics
- The Z Scherzo (2000) [11'00] For electric guitar and live multitrack recording
- Rat Bastard (1999) [6'30] For piano, electric guitar, cello and drum set; all amplified

ELECTROACOUSTIC

- acrobat (2005) [12’00] Electroacoustic composition
- The Garden Electric (1998) [7’26] Octophonic electroacoustic composition
- !Zip (a.k.a. Zipper Music 2) (1998) [7’21] Electroacoustic composition
- Zipper Music (1994) [3’00] Electroacoustic composition

INSTALLATIONS

- Aeolian Mobile 1: Paper Box Kite (2008) [variable duration] Sound installation (15-metre sonic mobile)
- :spin (2007) [variable duration] Sound installation (multiple suspended speakers)

== Selected Performers ==
Vancouver New Music, Francois Houle, Giorgio Magnanensi, eighth blackbird, Alizé, Ensemble Contemporain de Montréal, Harrignton/Loewen Duo, Roger Admiral, Corey Hamm, Sonic Generator, BIT20, Plexoos Ensemble, Arraymusic, Ensemble Symposium, Pro Coro Canada, the UBC Percussion Ensemble, Hammerhead Consort, Vancouver Pro Musica, Trio Fibonacci, Sequitur, Matthew Gold (Glass Farm Ensemble), edgeffect, Pazzia Contemporary Performing Collective, Sabastian Berweck, Jonathan Golove, Gwen Hoebig and David Moroz, Winnipeg New Music Festival and Groundswell.

== Affiliations ==
Gordon Fitzell is an Associate Composer of the Canadian Music Centre, a member of the Canadian League of Composers and the Canadian Electroacoustic Community; he is also President of the Groundswell Board of Directors. His music is represented by Art Music Promotion., which also represents composers Paul Steenhuisen, Howard Bashaw, Keith Hamel, Bob Pritchard, James Harley, André Ristic, and Aaron Gervais.

== Recent Publications ==
- "Riding the Dragon: Toward a Pedagogy of Free Musical Improvisation." eContact! 10.4 – Temps réel, improvisation et interactivité en électroacoustique / Live-electronics – Improvisation – Interactivity in Electroacoustics (October 2008). Montréal: CEC.
- Let Loose with WallBalls: A Collaborative Tabletop Instrument for Tomorrow, presented at NIME, Carnegie Mellon University, Pittsburgh (June 2009).
