= Aaron Gervais =

Canadian classical composer

- Born: 1
- Occupation: composer of contemporary classical music.

Aaron Gervais is a Canadian composer of contemporary classical music who lives in San Francisco.

He studied jazz performance at Grant MacEwan College and the University of Toronto, and composition at the University of Alberta, the University of Toronto, and UCSD. He currently works as a freelance composer and is based in San Francisco. His output consists of chamber, vocal, opera, electronic, solo/duo, and orchestral music.

== Awards ==
- Finalist, Gaudeamus Foundation's Music Week, 2006
- SOCAN Awards for Young Composers, several prizes 2004–2009
- orkest de ereprijs International Young Composers Meeting 2009, first prize

== See also ==
- List of Canadian composers
- Music of Canada

AMP represents the music of Aaron Gervais, Paul Steenhuisen, Howard Bashaw, Keith Hamel, Bob Pritchard, James Harley, André Ristic, and Gordon Fitzell.
