= Bob Pritchard (composer) =

Bob Pritchard (born 1956 in Calgary, Alberta) is a composer and teacher. His creative work includes experimental concert music, interactive music and video pieces, sound installations, direct synthesis, video/film, radiophonic works, and software development. His music is represented by AMP.

== Education ==
Bob Pritchard received a Bachelor of Music degree in Composition and Theory from the University of British Columbia. He subsequently obtained the Master of Music degree from the University of Toronto, where he became active with the Structured Sound Synthesis Project in the U of T Computer Systems Research Group. In the late 1990s, Pritchard returned to UBC to complete his Doctor of Music degree in composition, with a specialty in computer applications.

== Career ==
Pritchard has taught music at Brock University and Douglas College, and acoustics in the University of British Columbia Dept. of Physics, and is currently an assistant professor at the University of British Columbia School of Music. He is a researcher at the Media and Graphics Interdisciplinary Centre (MAGIC), and the Institute for Computing, Information and Cognitive Systems (ICICS) He has received research funding through the National Sciences and Engineering Research Council, the Social Sciences and Humanities Research Council of Canada, the Canada Council for the Arts/Natural Sciences and Engineering Research Council of Canada, UBC ArtsIT, and the BC Ministry of Skills Training and Labour Innovation Fund. He also has been commissioned by the Canada Council for the Arts, the Canadian Broadcasting Corporation, the New Brunswick Arts Council, the British Columbia Cultural Fund, and the Ontario Arts Council. His music has twice been selected by the International Society for Contemporary Music Canadian Section to represent Canada at the ISCM World Music Days. More recently, his work Strength was given a Unique Award of Merit from the Canadian Society of Cinematographers, and his film Crisis is part of Cathryn Robertson's cancer documentary 17 Short Films About Breasts, which was nominated for five Leo awards.

== List of Works ==
SOLO PERFORMER, INTERACTIVE PROCESSING AND/OR VIDEO

- What does a body know? (2009). For soprano, Digital Ventriloquized Actor (DIVA) and sound clips. Music and sound by Bob Pritchard, text by Meryn Cadell.
- Time and Place (2008/9). For dancer, video, and sound. Video, post production and sound by Bob Pritchard.
- Beneath the Skin (2006). For cello, sound and video files, and interactive processing. Electroacoustics, software, music, cinematography and images by Bob Pritchard
- Strength (2006). For alto saxophone, sound and video files, and interactive processing. Electroacoustics, software, music, and images by Bob Pritchard. Cinematography by Cathryn Robertson.
- Breathe on Me (2004). For accordion, sound and video files, and interactive processing. Electroacoustics, software, music, and images by Bob Pritchard
- Postcards From Our Futures (1989) Optional video component (2003). For piano and soundfiles. Electroacoustics, music, and images by Bob Pritchard

ORCHESTRA

- Begin the Begame (2000). Big band and skaters. (Written for the ice age.)
- Love Me Rite (1994). (Written for The Elvis Cantata.) Big band and soprano
- Desert Streams (1993). Chamber orchestra
- Swallow, Egg, Chrysanthemum (1992). Orchestra and piano

CHAMBER MUSIC

- …flow mingled down… (2002). Grand piano, mistuned upright piano and percussion
- I/You Have Wounded My Heart (2002). Clarinet, violin, 'cello, piano, and percussion.

CHORAL

- Three Songs of Life (2000). For Women's Choir (SSAA chorus), Handbells, and Gestures. Text by Bob Pritchard
- Three Songs: Snow, Night, A Kind of Feast. Texts by Anne Hebert, translated by Alan Brown
- Sleep (1997). For women's choir (SSA). Text by Jennifer Lockie

SOLO KEYBOARD

- Time Clips, Primitive (1993) Piano solo.
- Conjunctions (1991) Piano solo.
- Meditation (1986) Organ solo.

ELECTROACOUSTIC

- Escape My Soul (1996) bass flute and interactive electronics
- When the walls are all screaming (1993) Soprano, piano, and sound files
- Balance (1984) Bb clarinet and soundfiles
- Twisted Mirror, Shattered Dream (1993) Soundfiles
- Flight Paths (1988) Soundfiles
- Steel on Edge (1982) Viola, harp, and soundfiles

VIDEO

- Crisis (2008) Part of the breast cancer documentary 17 Short Films About Breasts. Video, post production and sound by Bob Pritchard (for Crisis)

ELECTROACOUSTICS WITH INSTALLATIONS

- The Aurora on All Three Channels (2000). Sound Sculpture Installation: Richard Prince, Ed Casas, David Floren, Keith Hamel and Bob Pritchard.
- Visions III (1986). Sound files, 35 mm. slides, textured 3D screen. Electroacoustics and images by Bob Pritchard
- Escarpment Series (1984). Three touch-sensitive sound sculptures. Collaboration with M. Kropf.
- Soundscape for "La Maison" (1984). Installation work with visual artists Carol Bretzloff, Suzanne Joubert, Jane Martin, Merijean Morrissey, and Susan Geraldine Taylor.
- Movement (1983). Installation with visual artist R. Creighton.
- Soundscape for "Waltzing Tent, Singing Box" (1983). Installation work by Anne Severs.

RADIO SOUND

- Welcome to the Widget Factory (1993). Written/produced by Keith Watt. Sound effects by Bob Pritchard.

== Performers ==
Margeurite Witvoet (voice), Roberta Botelli (cello), Julia Nolan (saxophone), Joseph Petric (accordion), Kathryn Cernauskas (flute), Vancouver New Music, Okanagan Symphony, Calgary Philharmonic Orchestra, Hard Rubber Orchestra, Standing Wave, Barbara Pritchard (piano), Beverley Johnston (percussion), Barbara Hannigan (soprano), Cartier String Quartet, Peter Hannan (recorder), Doug Perry (viola), Charlotte Moon (harp). Jane Coop (piano), Elektra Women's Choir, UBC University Singers.

Conductors: Owen Underhill, Dianne Loomer, John Korsrud, Victor Feldbrill, Leonard Camplin, James Fankhauser.

== Affiliations ==
Bob Pritchard is an Associate Composer of the Canadian Music Centre, and a member of the Canadian League of Composers. He is also the vice-chair of the Canadian Music Centre's BC Region.

AMP represents the music of Paul Steenhuisen, Howard Bashaw, Keith Hamel, Bob Pritchard, James Harley, André Ristic, Gordon Fitzell, and Aaron Gervais.
