= Derome =

Derome or DeRome is a surname. Notable people with the surname include:

- Albert Thomas DeRome (1885–1959), American artist
- Bernard Derome (born 1944), Canadian broadcaster
- Jean Derome (born 1955), Canadian saxophonist, flautist, and composer
- Julie-Anne Derome, Canadian violinist
- Philippe Derome (born 1937), French figurative painter
- Wilfrid Derome (1877–1931), American forensic scientist
