= Dilettante =

Dilettante or dilettantes may refer to:

- Amateur, someone with a non-professional interest
- Dilettante (album), a 2005 album by Ali Project
- Dilettantes (album), a 2008 album by You Am I
- Dilettante Music, a classical music website with social networking features
- Dilettante Press, a now-defunct independent book publisher
- The Dilettantes, a San Francisco neo-psychedelic rock band
- The Dilettante, a 1999 French film
- A member of the Dilettante Society
