= Diamonds Under Fire =

US alternative rock band

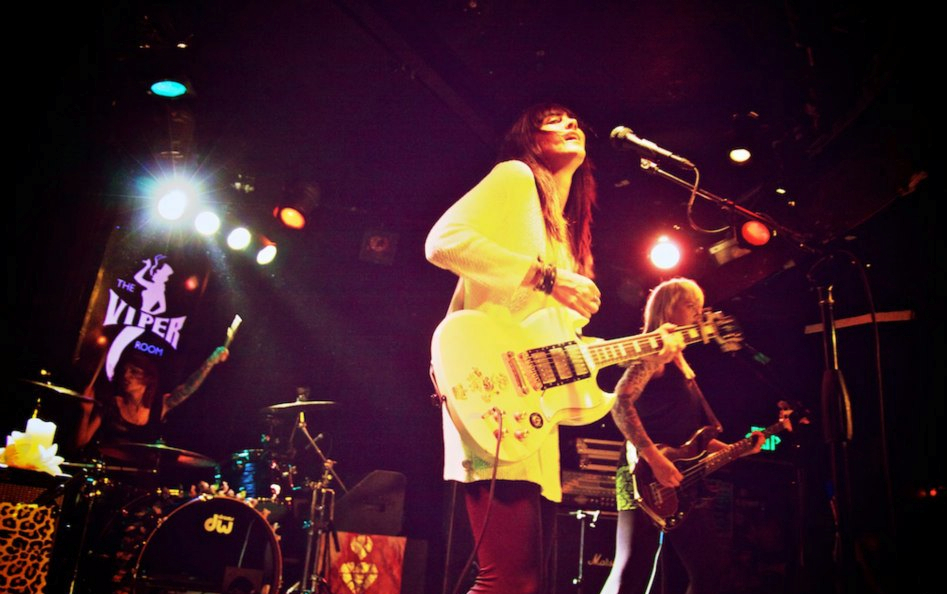

Background information
- Origin: Los Angeles, California, United States
- Genres: Alternative, rock, pop rock
- Years active: 2002 – 2014
- Label: A Diamond Heart Production
- Members: Vanessa Silberman; Jessica Goodwin; Melinda Holm
- Past members: Bryan Stage

Diamonds Under Fire was a Los Angeles based alternative rock band and moniker founded by lead vocalist and guitarist Vanessa Silberman, and later drummer Jessica Goodwin and bassist Melinda Holms were added to the line up.

== History ==
In April 2011 Diamonds Under Fire self-released the debut record produced by Vanessa Silberman tracked with Kevin Calaba at Paul Green's Studio House (School of Rock creator in Long Island, New York). A tour supported the release which included dates with electro-rock duo Uh Huh Her.

In early 2012, after over eight years of different player and lineup changes, drummer Jessica Goodwin and bassist Melinda Holms joined the group. In the summer of 2012 they released the single "Sunshine" and the new three-piece lineup made their live debut at Sunset Strip Music Festival at The Viper Room.

Diamonds Under Fire spent most of 2013 in the studio (where Silberman also worked as assistant engineer), finishing the EP and collaborating with producer and engineer John "Lou" Lousteau.

Diamonds Under Fire has self-released one single, four demo / EPs and two CDs, and has toured the US ten times, also playing Canada, the UK, and SXSW. Locally in Los Angeles the band has played El Rey, The Troubadour, The Satellite, The Echo and The Bootleg Theatre. Diamonds Under Fire has performed alongside Meg Myers, Dead Sara, LP, Butterfly Boucher and Brian Glaze (Brian Jonestown Massacre). The band has been featured on Vans Off The Wall compilations 7, 8, 9 and 10, and in Guitar Player Magazine with a cover call out. The band's music has been in regular rotation on commercial and noncommercial radio (including KWSS-LP 93.9FM), and was featured on Time Warner's 'SoCal Beat'.

Diamonds Under Fire's three-piece powerhouse live show and music have often been compared to the raw grunge rock 'n roll of Nirvana, Joan Jett, Joey Ramone, and Chrissie Hynde, with the danciness of No Doubt and the vocal pop melody sensibilities of Pink.

As a holiday gift to fans, to hold them over till the new EP, Diamonds Under Fire released Heart on Hiatus (Deluxe Edition) on December 10, 2013. This featured previously unreleased demos, b-sides and remixes by Kidforce and My Satellite.

Silberman's vocals can be heard featured on Kidforce's song "STFU" off his Deathpop EP as well as on UK band Polaroid Kiss's debut album Youth, which was released on March 20, 2015 on German record label ZYX Music, which also features artists such as Steve Kilbey of the band The Church.

Vanessa Silberman released her first solo single, "Think Tank" (feat. Derek Jordan) on July 21, 2015 on her imprint, A Diamond Heart Production. She performed at Port of Los Angeles Lobster Fest on Sept. 26th, 2015 and did her first solo US tour in September - November. She released her second single, "I Know" (feat. Super Black Market) in December. She released another single, "American Folk Rock" on Feb. 14 2016 while supporting it through a solo US tour in February through April, along with UK and Berlin dates. In June 2017 Vanessa played the final Vans Warped Tour and released a single called "Outswimming Sharks" which was Recorded by Ken Susi of Unearth.

Silberman is currently focused on her solo musical career, and is a recording engineer and producer. She also runs an artist development company and label (A Diamond Heart Production) and works with bands and artists including Tea Eater (featuring members of Gustaf (band), Amanda Tori Meating, Down and Outlaws, The Love Dimension, and Repeater.

== Discography ==
=== Singles ===
- "Sunshine" (self-released, 2012)

=== CDs ===
- Diamonds Under Fire (self-released, 2011)

=== EPs ===
- Hearts On Hiatus EP (self-released, 2005)
- Diamonds Under Fire Demos / EP (self-released, 2007)
- Diamonds Under Fire EP (self-released, 2008)
- Hearts On Hiatus (Deluxe Edition) (December 10, 2013)

=== Compilations ===
- Vans Off The Wall Volume 7 CD (Vans, 2004) - "Empty Walls"
- Vans Off The Wall Volume 8 CD (Vans, 2005) - "Everything Fades To Red"
- Vans Off The Wall Volume 9 CD (Vans, 2006) - "Redefining Deception"
- Vans Off The Wall Volume 10 CD (Vans, 2007) - "This Song"
