= Steenhuisen =

Steenhuisen is a surname. Notable people with the surname include:

- John Steenhuisen (born 1976), South African politician
- Paul Steenhuisen (born 1965), Canadian composer
