= Bob Pritchard =

Bob Pritchard may refer to:

- Robert W. Pritchard (born 1945), member of the Illinois House of Representatives
- Bob Pritchard (composer) (born 1956), Canadian composer and teacher
