= The Love Dimension =

- Origin: San Francisco, California
- Genres: Psychedelic rock, grunge, garage rock
- Labels: Lolipop Records/A Diamond Heart Production/Warrior Monk Records (US) and Smoky Carrot Records (UK)
- Members: Jimmy L. Dias, Celeste Obomsawin, Devin Farney, Robinson Kuntz, Ryan Erickson, Amy Jane Cronkleton

San Francisco psychedelic rock and grunge inspired musical collective The Love Dimension was founded in 2008 by Stoughton, Massachusetts born and Oakland, California transplant Jimmy Dias.

== History ==
Though The Love Dimension's core & current lineup is Jimmy L. Dias (vocals/guitar), Celeste Obomsawin (vocals/percussion/flute), Devin Farney (keyboards/vocals), Robinson Kuntz (drummer) and Michael Summers (bass) the band is known for its San Francisco Bay Area collective as it has featured in its different formations as many as over 80 different players including Andy Duncan (OK Go's original guitar player), drummer Ryan Scott Long, LoveLikeFire's Eric Amerman, The Union Trade's drummer Eitan Anzenberg, Greg Ashley (Engineer, Composer & member of The Gris Gris), Sean Carney, Jason Correia of The Suicide File, The Dilettantes drummer KC Kozak, Vanessa Silberman, and Jason Quever of Papercuts (band).

The band premiered 'When Soul Love Begins' in June 2016 on Purevolume from its Tomas Dolas (Mr. Elevator and The Brain Hotel) Produced 'Freakquency Space Mind Continuum' EP and was also featured by The San Francisco Weekly and The Vinyl District.

The band has played well known festivals including Noise Pop Festival, Whole Earth Festival at UC Davis, the Alameda County Fairgrounds and the Ventura County Fair, Haight Ashbury Street Fair, Gathering of the Tribes, Desert Stars Festival and also have shared the stage with acts such as The Lemonheads, Swervedriver, Lou Barlow of Dinosaur Jr. and Sebadoh, Dead Meadow, The Entrance Band, Down Dirty Shake, Down and Outlaws and The Stone Foxes.

The band's song 'When Soul Love Begins' from their 2016 release 'Freakquency Space Mind Continuum' went to #3 on 88.1FM WMBR in Cambridge, MA, #13 on KDUR 91.9FM in Durango, CO and their unreleased song 'Had Enough' was also featured in the TV Show Aquarius, starring David Duchovny.

The band is currently in the studio with Producer Engineer Tommy Dietrick (Drinking Flowers, Ringo Deathstarr, The International Swingers that features Glen Matlock of the Sex Pistols and Clem Burke of Blondie). Dietrick also produced The Love Dimension's up coming TBA 2017 'Acceptance' album.

== Discography ==
=== Albums ===
- In Between Lives (2011 Warrior Monk Records)
- Forget the Remember (2012 Warrior Monk Records)
- Create and Consume (2014 Warrior Monk Records)

=== EPs ===
- The Love Dimension (2010)
- Not Until All Beings Are One (2012 Smoky Carrot Records)
- Freakquency Space Mind Continuum (2016 A Diamond Heart Production)
- Acceptance (TBA 2017)

=== Singles ===
- Got Gratitude (2014 Warrior Monk Records)
- Messenger of Love (2014 Warrior Monk Records)

=== 7 Inches ===
- The Dark Night of Your Soul/Butterflies of Bliss (2010)

=== Live Recordings ===
- Live & Unplugged on Pirate Cat Radio 87.9 (2009)
