= Richard Covey =

Richard Covey may refer to:

- Richard O. Covey (born 1946), United States Air Force officer and former NASA astronaut
- Richard Covey (composer) (born 1979), Canadian composer
