= S. D. Holman =

Canadian artist and curator

SD Holman (born 22 May 1963), also known as Shaira Holman, is a Canadian and American artist and curator.

Their 2014 photography exhibit BUTCH: Not Like the Other Girls, which is also an art book, explored female masculinity and queer visibility in contemporary portraiture.

Holman graduated from the Emily Carr University of Art and Design in 1990.

== Artistic practice ==
Holman's exhibition BUTCH: Not Like the Other Girls explored female masculinity and queer visibility in contemporary portraiture. The show toured internationally.

Their solo exhibitions include Momento Mori, curated by Paul Wong at Capture Festival, and Pas-à-pas; not intent on arriving, which premiered at SUM Gallery in 2023. Pas-à-pas was inspired by Holman’s walk across Canada following the death of their wife, Catherine White Holman, in a plane crash. In 2026 SD Holman and Dr. Rachel Kiyo Iwaasa collaborated on an exhibition of Pas-à-pas; not intent on arriving, at the Comox Valley Art Gallery. Of the piece, Holman said: "Life would never be so precious without death. It is all connected."

In 2025 Music for Turtles premiered as a collaboration with the pianist Dr. Rachel Kiyo Iwaasa. Music for Turtles uses the Turtle as a metaphor to explore themes of ecological grief and Interbeing.

== Curatorial work ==
Holman is the founding Artistic Director of the Pride in Art (PiA) Society, 2006. They are also the founding Artistic Director of the Queer Arts Festival (2007–2022). In 2008 Holman organized the first multidisciplinary Queer Arts Festival.

Holman founded SUM Gallery in 2018 as the Queer Arts Festival's year-round programming arm. SUM Gallery was the only queer-mandated multidisciplinary arts gallery in Canada at that time.

== Awards ==
In 2014 Holman received the YWCA Women of Distinction Award.

In 2025 Holman was awarded the King Charles III Coronation Medal for, "significant contributions to the arts, culture, and human rights advocacy", by Canadian Member of Parliament Jenny Kwan.

== List of works ==
=== Curatorial projects ===
- Vanishing Act, 2022
- It’s not easy being green, 2021
- Piano Burning, 2021
- WICKED, 2020
- Time-lapse: Posthumous Conversations, a Geoff McMurchy retrospective
- DECADEnce, 2018
- rEvolution, 2019
- UnSettled, 2017
- Drama Queer, 2016
- TRIGGER: Drawing the Line, 2015

=== Publications ===
- BUTCH: Not Like the Other Girls. (1st ed. 2014, Shooting Gallery Press, Vancouver; 2nd ed. 2020, Dagger Editions, Caitlin Press) ISBN 9781987915426
