= Robert Pritchard =

Robert Pritchard may refer to:

- Robert W. Pritchard (born 1945), American politician in Illinois

== See also ==
- Bob Pritchard (composer) (born 1956), Canadian composer and teacher
