= Powell Street Festival =

Annual festival in Paueru-Gai, Vancouver, Canada

The Powell Street Festival is an ongoing annual festival in Paueru-Gai, Vancouver. Originating in 1977 the Powell Street Festival is the largest Japanese Canadian festival and the longest ongoing community event in Vancouver. The festival takes place in and around Oppenheimer Park. The Festival takes place every BC Day long weekend, which usually lands around the beginning of August.

Powell Street Festival features both local, national, and international talent. It also features an outdoor venue with interactive installations, children's activities, craft market, martial arts demonstrations, taiko drumming, amateur sumo tournament, tea ceremonies, ikebana and bonsai demonstrations.

== Artists, Performers, and Talent ==
=== Local / Lower Mainland ===
- Mark Takeshi McGregor, flutist
- Kytami, violinist
- David Suzuki, environmentalist and activist
- Joy Kogawa, writer

=== National / Canadian ===
- Teke::Teke, band, Montreal
- Diyet, folk musician, Yukon

=== International ===
- Yuni Mori, pianist, Japan
- George and Noriko, musicians, Australia
- Katie Malia, comedian and filmmaker, Los Angeles, United States
- Jay Rubin, translator, Washington D.C, United States
- GRMLN, musician, California, United States
