= Vanessa Silberman =

American singer-songwriter

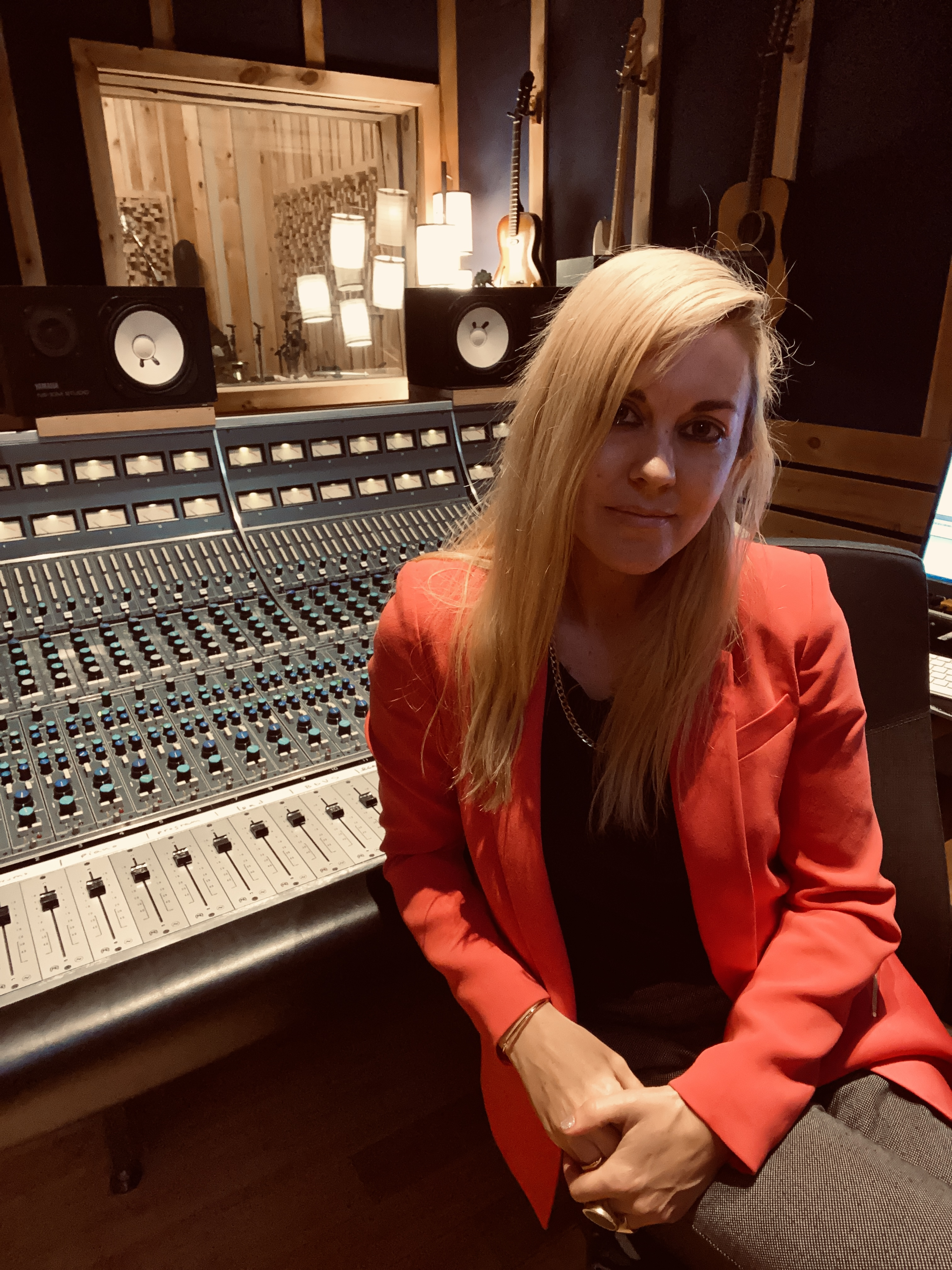
- Vanessa Silberman at Bunker Studio in Brooklyn, NY

Background information
- Born: Vanessa Silberman; Berkeley, California, United States
- Genres: Rock, grunge rock, pop, dance, alt pop, indie pop
- Occupations: Guitarist, background singer, singer-songwriter, record producer, recording engineer, A&R
- Instruments: Vocals, Guitar; Bass drums
- Years active: 2001–present
- Label: A Diamond Heart Production
- Formerly of: Diamonds Under Fire
- Website: Vanessasilberman.com

Vanessa Silberman is a singer, guitarist, record producer, engineer, an entrepreneur, A&R and runs her own label A Diamond Heart Production. She is also part of the duo Lovecolor with actor / musician Ryan Carnes. She is known for her DIY ethic, extensive grass roots touring as well as wearing many different hats in the music business, and was dubbed the "DIY queen" and "nothing less than a super human" by Rocknloadmag.com. On June 1, 2021 Alternative Press Magazine named Silberman's A Diamond Heart Production 1 of 11 LGBTQIA+ and women-owned labels that are changing the music industry

Silberman launched a new solo music project under the name V★Silver in September 2025 and SPIN Magazine described it similar to Ladyhawke (musician) and Robyn.

== Career ==
=== Early life ===
Vanessa grew up living in between the San Francisco Bay Area and Kauai, Hawaii. In 1994 she was one of 102 finalists out of 150,000 entries submitted in the United States Postal Service contest for youngsters to design a new environmental postage stamp.

=== Solo touring, material, background and collaborations ===
Between 2015 and 2020 Vanessa toured the country and played well over 800 shows. Audiofemme.com named Vanessa one of the hardest working DIY bands of 2019, 2018 & 2017 as she played over 200 shows.

On Feb. 12th, 2021 Vanessa released the single 'My Love', which was compared to synth pop artist chvrches and electronic pop act Sylvan Esso by Earmilk which showcased a new music direction.

Throughout 2020, Vanessa released 7 self-produced singles, starting with her first single 'Who We Are' which showcases her staple positive and uplifting lyrics. Her 4th single 'Hey All' talking about topics such as equal rights She was also the first artist to ever livestream for the entire company staff at IHeartRadio's New York headquarters.

Vanessa collaborates and plays with drummer/actor Ryan Carnes whose vocals can also be heard on numerous singles, including 'My Love' and 'Written in the Stars'.

In November 2022 Vanessa and Ryan launched their band LOVECOLOR and on Feb 2nd, 2023 premiered their song 'Dangerous' Produced, Recorded and Mastered by Vanessa, Co-Produced by Ryan and Mixed by Andrew Dawson (Jay Z, Fun., Phantogram & Kayne West).

On October 12, 2014, Silberman played solo and opened up for Alkaline Trio at the Troubadour as part of their Past Live tour.

On July 21, 2015, Silberman released her first solo single 'Think Tank (Feat. Derek Jordan)' on iTunes via A Diamond Heart Production and performed at Alt 98.7FM Port of Los Angeles Lobster Festival on September 26, 2015.

Silberman did her first solo US tour in October and November 2015 and released her second single "I Know (feat. Super Black Market)" on December 22.

A third single "American Folk Rock" was released on February 14 and supported with a 39-day solo U.S. tour. "Awake & Feeling", Silberman's 4th single, was released on July 15 and followed up with a 52-date Shine solo tour across the U.S.

Silberman released her debut self-produced and self-titled EP on October 7. which contains her previous singles and another new song, "Shine".

Silberman appeared live on television on Fresno's KMPH-TV Fox26 'Festive Friday' morning show on Oct. 28th 2016 with Jimmy Dias of The Love Dimension to promote their upcoming joint tour as well as again performing Silberman's songs on Friday, April 7, 2017, to kick off their U.S. tour.

In March 2017 Silberman did an East Coast touring featuring drummer Reed Mullin of Corrosion of Conformity and producer/musician Mikel Ross. And again in July 2017 Silberman did another tour with Mullin and Ross up the West Coast backing her as the Vanessa Silberman Band with Boston's 38th annual Rock 'n' Roll Rumble winner Carissa Johnson opening up.

Silberman, Mullin and Ross debuted 'OK' a single they recorded together under the Vanessa Silberman Band on The Goddamn Dave Hill (comedian) show on the free-form radio station WFMU 91.1FM New York, NY on May 14, 2018. Silberman, Mullin and Ross all met working on the Teenage Time Killers Record at Studio 606, the Foo Fighters Recording Studio where Silberman was an in-house assistant engineer.

In June and July 2017 Vanessa played 3 dates on the final Vans Warped Tour and released a new song on June 29 called "Outswimming Sharks" which was a recording collaboration with guitarist and producer Ken Susi of metal band Unearth. The single's video premiered on New Noise Magazine on July 13, 2017.

Vanessa did a touring & recording artist series with Apple where she spoke and performed at their San Francisco Union Square store through the winter of 2018–2019. She also performed at the NAMM Show in 2019.

She released 3 singles and 2 videos from her EP 'Brighter in Bloom' (released on Sept. 20th on her label A Diamond Heart Production), 'I Got a Reason' on May 10 and 'Love' on June 21. The music video for 'Don't', a song Vanessa is known for playing live was premiered by Audiofemme on Nov. 15th 2019. 'Love' and 'Don't' have both been played on Rodney Bingenheimer's Under Ground Garage show.

Silberman contributed rap style vocals to Kidforce's STFU, a track off of his Deathpop EP.

=== A Diamond Heart Production ===
In 2013 Silberman established A Diamond Heart Production, an artist development label, music and publishing company. She has managed, developed and produced several acts, and the imprint has released over 55 releases. (Down and Outlaws album Above Snakes on July 8, 2016, Repeater's self-titled album on November 18, 2013 and The Love Dimension).

Vanessa has also spoken on panels, at events and schools about artist development including Girl Power! Music Conference, SAE, School of Rock, SoundGirls. In 2018 & 2019 she spoke and did a series at Today at Apple in Union Square, San Francisco.

=== Diamonds Under Fire ===
Diamonds Under Fire. was an alternative rock grunge band established in 2002 by Silberman when she was in her teens. The Band has released a Single, 4 Demo / EP's, 2 CD's and 3 Official Music videos as well as toured the US, Canada and played the UK. Diamonds Under Fire also opened up and supported Uh Huh Her (band) on their second major tour for numerous in 2011 through the U.S and Canadian.

=== Personal life ===
Vanessa is vegan and straight edge.
