= Musée de la civilisation =

Museum in Quebec City

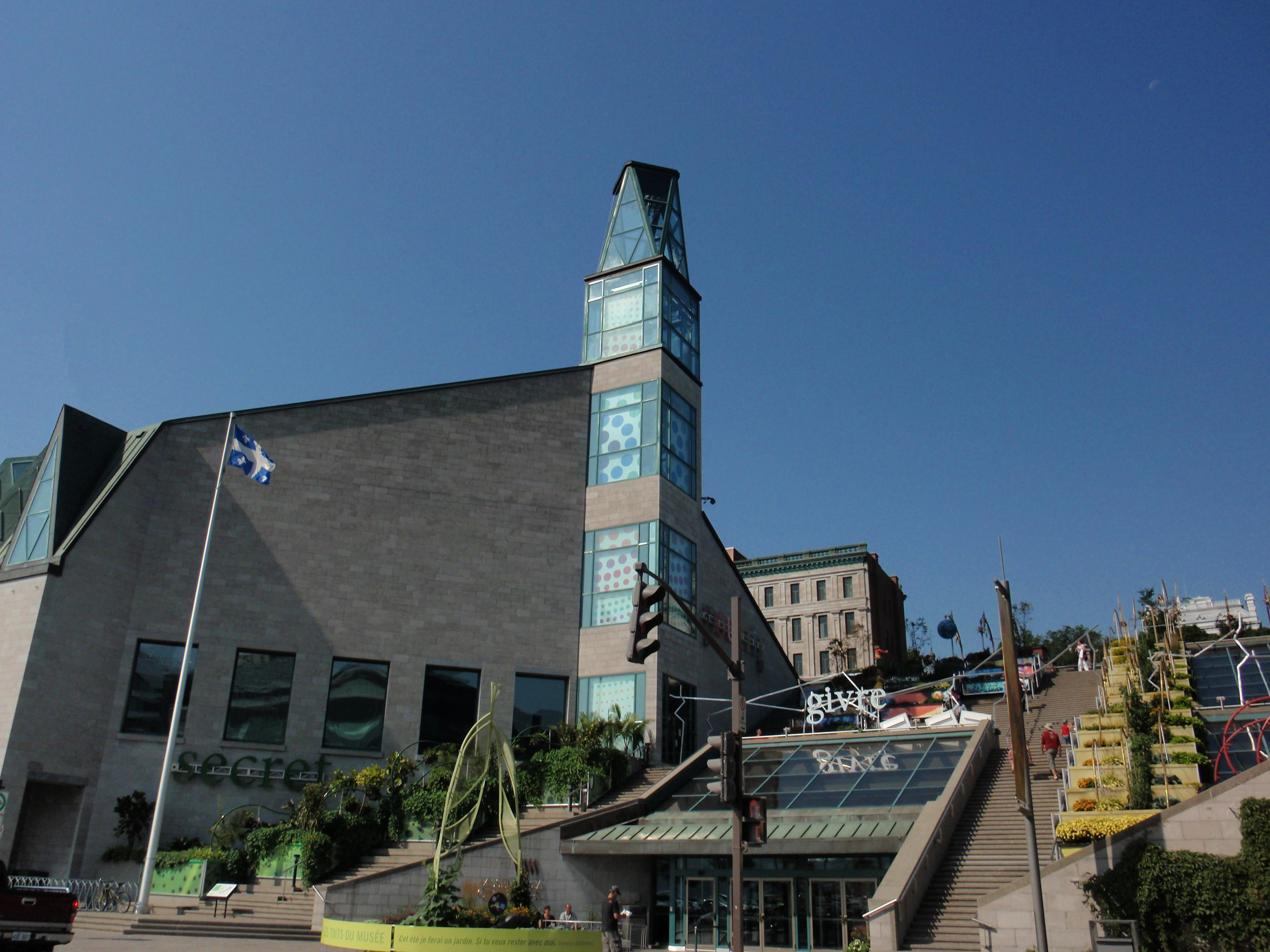
- Established: 19 December 1984
- Location: 85, rue Dalhousie; Quebec City, Quebec; G1K 8R2
- Coordinates: 46°48′54.39″N 71°12′8.58″W
- Type: humanities
- Visitors: 543,128 (FY 2005)
- Director: Stéphan La Roche, CEO (Directeur général)
- Website: www.mcq.org

The Musée de la civilisation, often directly translated in English-language media outside Quebec as the Museum of Civilization, is a museum located in Quebec City, Quebec, Canada. It is situated in the historic Old Quebec area near the Saint Lawrence River. It was designed by architect Moshe Safdie, and opened its doors to the public on 19 October 1988.

The museum collections include artifacts related to art, society, and ethnography. There are over 225,000 objects in the collection.

The previous buildings of the Banque de Paris and the Maison Estèbe, which were situated on Saint-Pierre street, were integrated in the museum's structure. Permanent and temporary exhibitions are held at the museum, usually related to humanities, and virtual exhibitions are also available. The institution also hosts Quartier des découvertes (Discovery Zone), geared towards children, and offers other services such as guided visits, a French America reference centre, shows, souvenir boutiques, a cafeteria, and a leisure room.

== Images ==
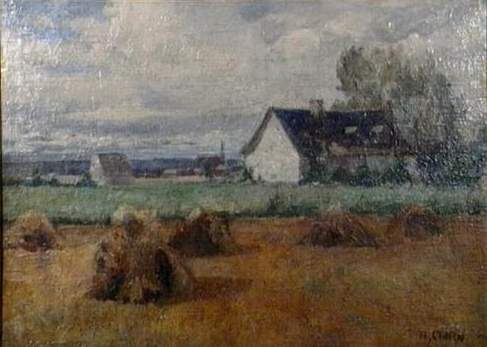
Paysage de l'Ile d'Orléans

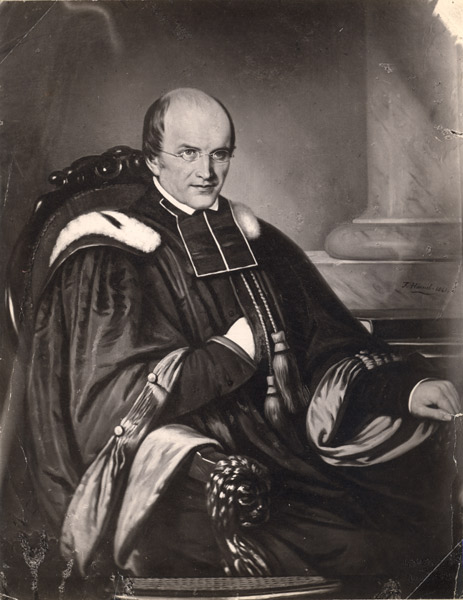
Louis-Jacques Casault

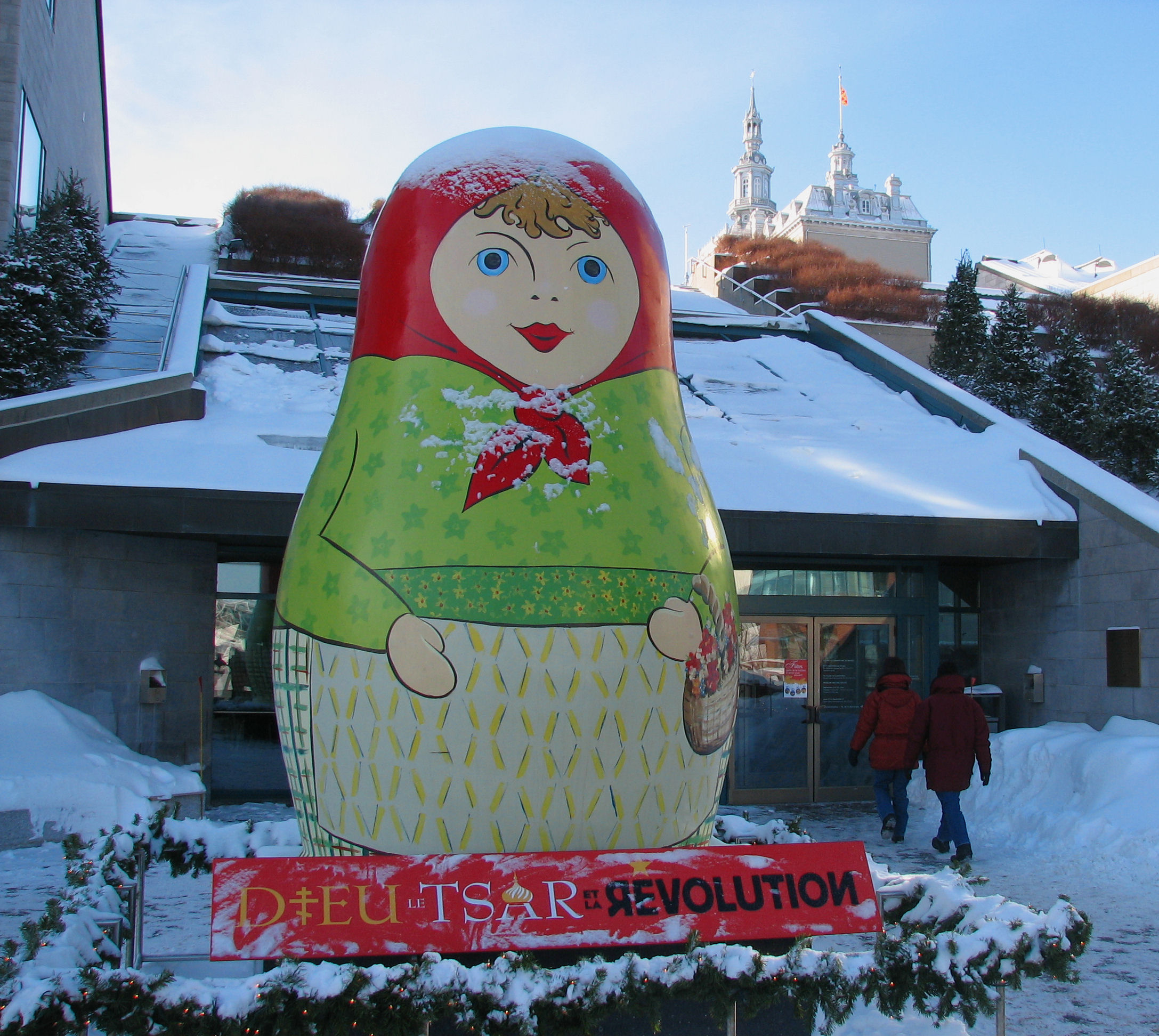
Winter 2005, Dieu-Tsar-Revolution exhibition

== Human remains controversy ==
During the spring of 2021, The Globe and Mail published an article by journalist Kate Taylor about research concerning the museum's large collection of human remains. This collection, on long-term loan from the provincial Ministry of Public Security, includes more than one hundred body parts—such as tattooed skin from a 29-year-old homicide victim named Mildred Brown—taken from the bodies of murder victims by Dr. Wilfrid Derome during the early twentieth century.

== Exhibitions ==
- Territoires (Territories)
- Le Temps des Québécois (People of Québec ... then and Now)
- Nous, les premières nations (Encounter with the First Nations)

== Affiliations ==
The Museum is affiliated with: the Canadian Museums Association, the Canadian Heritage Information Network, and the Virtual Museum of Canada.

== See also ==
- Culture of Quebec
- List of museums in Quebec
- Musée de l'Amérique française
- Canadian Museum of Civilization in Hull, Quebec
