= Eklektikos =

Canadian classical chamber music ensemble

eklektikos
- Origin: Charlottetown, Prince Edward Island, Canada
- Genres: Classical
- Years active: 2002–present
- Members: Dale Sorensen (trombone, artistic director); Morgan Saulnier (flute); Karem Simon (clarinet); Richard Covey (piano)
- Website: eklektikos.pinegrovemusic.com

eklektikos is a classical chamber music ensemble specializing in the performance of music by contemporary Canadian composers. Based in Charlottetown, Prince Edward Island, Canada, its core members include Dale Sorensen (trombone and artistic director), Morgan Saulnier (flute), Karem Simon (clarinet), and Richard Covey (piano).

== History ==
The contemporary classical chamber music ensemble eklektikos was founded in 2002 by Prince Edward Island trombonist Dale Sorensen, the group's current artistic director. That same year the ensemble recorded the score for Picking Lucy's Brain, a film written and directed by Jason Rogerson, with original music composed by Barrie Sorensen. The group was also featured at the 2002 Canadian Acoustical Association's national conference, which was held in Charlottetown.

As part of its commitment to the performance of Canadian music, eklektikos has been invited several times to participate in the Canadian Music Centre's New Music in New Places project. Funded by SOCAN and the Government of Canada through their Canada Music Fund, this program was created to disseminate the music of Canadian composers to a wider public by presenting performances in non-traditional venues. Some of eklektikos' performances were held at the Charlottetown Mall (April 2005), the Charlottetown Farmers Market (2008), the Charlottetown Toyota car dealership (November 2009), and the Charlottetown Airport (March 2011).

Several new compositions have been created through grants that eklektikos has received from the Prince Edward Island Council of the Arts. One of these projects resulted in the creation of new works by eight Prince Edward Island composers, all of which were premiered by eklektikos in March 2005. Another project, in July 2007, facilitated the creation of new works by four young Atlantic Canadian composers who were mentored by Jim O'Leary during a 4-day workshop which culminated in a public performance of all the new works.

eklektikos regularly performs on the recital series at the UPEI Music Department, where all of the ensemble members serve on faculty.

== Premieres ==
eklektikos has given the world premiere performances of the following 23 compositions, most of which were written by Canadian composers, including 16 works by Prince Edward Island composers.

- W.L. Altman: Inside C (flute, alto saxophone, trumpet, trombone, vibraphone, piano) - 2002
- Jennifer Barrett-Drew: Two Trees in Eden (flute, trombone, cello, guitar, piano) - 2005
- Jean Chatillon: Le son du verre (alto saxophone, trombone) - 2007
- Monica Clorey: Five Waltzes (or The Epicurean Anthem) (flute, clarinet, trumpet, trombone, piano) - 2007
- James Grant Code: Scherzo Eclectique (trumpet, trombone, piano) - 2002
- Richard Covey: Discord (flute) - 2005
- Richard Covey: Improvvisando (trombone, piano) - 2010
- Richard Covey: Sounds on the Waves (flute, clarinet, trumpet, trombone, piano) - 2007
- Richard Covey: Te Deum (flute, clarinet, piano) - 2010
- Jim Dickson: Blues for Henry (alto saxophone, trombone, banjo, snare drum) - 2009
- Jim Dickson: Odd One Out (flute, trumpet, trombone, piano, percussion) - 2005
- Matt Doran: Quartet (flute, marimba, trombone, piano) - 2006
- Anthony Genge: Shadows and Glass (trombone, piano) - 2004
- Matthew Lane: The Weaving Together (flute, clarinet, trumpet, trombone, piano, CD) - 2007
- Jane Naylor: To Another Time (flute, trombone) - 2005
- Jim O'Leary: Two Landscapes (soprano, flute, clarinet, trumpet, trombone, piano) - 2007
- Jim O'Leary: Fläskfilé (soprano, clarinet, trumpet, trombone) - 2007
- Gerry Rutten: PEI Suite (flute, trumpet, trombone, piano, percussion) - 2005
- Karri Shea: Enniskillen (flute, clarinet, trumpet, trombone) - 2007
- Dale Sorensen: Eine Kleine Naught Musik (flute, tenor saxophone, trumpet, trombone, marimba, piano) - 2005
- Bert Tersteeg: Bachanalis (flute, trumpet, trombone, vibraphone, piano) - 2005
- Bert Tersteeg: Western Skies (from 4 Canadian Scenes) (flute, trumpet, trombone, piano) - 2006
- Seth von Handorf: Cartoon Circus Spy (flute, alto saxophone, trumpet, trombone, vibraphone, piano) - 2005
