= Dilettante Music =

Online classical music hub

Dilettante was an online classical music hub based in London, England. The platform enabled classical music fans from around the world to connect and share with each other. The site saw a major redesign in May 2009 which implemented "new ticketing, media and retail partners, video tutorials, a new personalized homepage, Dilettante Radio, a discussion forum and Dilettante Guru, a site-wide search tool." At its peak, Dilettante claimed to have over 15,000 unique visitors each month from over 100 countries.

As of December 2010, Dilettante Music has been taken off-line, citing financial difficulties.

== History ==
Dilettante was founded in January 2008 by Juliana Farha, a Canadian journalist and businesswoman who believed that social media was the ideal tool to support classical music and musicians.

=== Digital Composer-in-Residence ===
In 2009 Dilettante held a 'Digital Composer-in-Residence' competition which was the first such position to be offered anywhere in the world. The competition consisted of a preliminary period where applicants were judged on their compositions by a judging panel including Nico Muhly, Michael Christie and Jennifer Higdon, a period with voting open to the public, and a final event held at Wilton's Music Hall, London. The final took place on November 5, 2009 and was presented by conductor Charles Hazlewood. The finalists were Canadian Aaron Gervais, Taiwanese Chiayu and American David T. Little, whose compositions were performed by the London Sinfonietta alongside works that inspired them, including pieces by "great modernist iconoclasts, Charles Ives and György Ligeti... [and] Jonathan Harvey, a composer of lofty spiritual inclinations." The title was won by David T. Little who took a £1,000 prize and has a dedicated section on the website.

== Awards ==
In 2009, Dilettante was shortlisted for 'Website of the Year' on The Good Web Guide, who said that the site "aims to break down the barriers to classical music by connecting organisations and musicians with audiences, listeners with recorded and live music, and members of the worldwide classical community with each other.".
