= Richard Covey (composer) =

Canadian composer

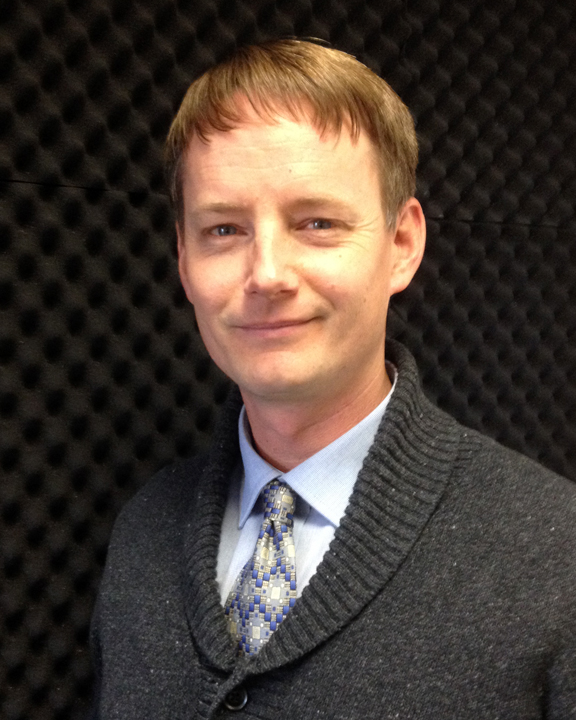

Background information
- Born: May 28, 1979 (age 47); Brockville, Ontario, Canada
- Genre: Classical
- Occupations: composer, educator
- Instrument: Piano
- Website: www.musiccentre.ca/node/134020/biography

Richard Covey (born May 28, 1979) is a Canadian composer who is currently a sessional instructor in the Department of Music at the University of Prince Edward Island.

== Biography ==
Canadian composer Richard Covey was born in Brockville, Ontario, Canada on May 28, 1979. Since 2006 he has resided in Prince Edward Island, where he teaches theory and composition in the Music Department at the University of Prince Edward Island (UPEI), and also performs as a pianist with the contemporary chamber music ensemble eklektikos and other musicians. As a professional composer, Covey has received several commissions, and his works have been performed by orchestras such as Kitchener-Waterloo Symphony Orchestra, Prince Edward Island Symphony Orchestra; wind ensembles such as Charlottetown Rural High School Senior Concert Band, Queen Charlotte Intermediate School Band, UPEI Wind Symphony; chamber ensembles such as eklektikos and the Gryphon Trio; and choirs such as Sirens. His Echoes was chosen as the required work for UBC's 2012 Knigge Piano Competition.

In 2017, Covey was one of four Atlantic Canadian composers commissioned by the Prince Edward Island Symphony Orchestra to create a collaborative work, Cantata for Canada 150, in celebration of the 150th anniversary of Canadian Confederation. Each composer was asked to set their music to poetry written by one of four young Prince Edward Island students chosen through a provincial poetry contest. The poem Covey set was titled 'As I Walk'. Created with partial funding from the Canadian federal government, the new work received its premiere on November 19, 2017.

As an educator, Richard Covey's work extends beyond the university and into the community. In 2016, for example, Covey worked with the Grade 8 band students at Queen Charlotte Intermediate School, in Charlottetown, Prince Edward Island, to create a new work based on the anti-bullying themes behind the school's new motto, "Reflect, respect, connect". The project, made possible through an ArtsSmarts grant, allowed Covey to guide the students through a musical exploration of the themes of their motto, which culminated in a public performance of their collaborative composition.

Covey is an Associate Composer of the Canadian Music Centre.

== Education ==
- B.Mus., Wilfrid Laurier University (Jamie Parker, piano; Glenn Buhr, composition)
- M.Mus., University of British Columbia (Stephen Chatman, composition)
- D.M.A., University of British Columbia (Dorothy Chang, Keith Hamel, composition)

== Compositions ==
=== Solo works ===
- In the Groove (piano) 2016
- Over the Sand Dunes (piano) 2016
- The Moment When (alto saxophone) 2013
- Echoes (piano) 2012
- Echoes I: Of Time and Tone (piano) 2011
- Discord (flute) 2005 - Premiered by eklektikos on April 9, 2005.
- Wedding March (organ)
- Wedding March No. 2 (piano) 2012
- Piano Sonata No. 1
- Berceuse (piano)

=== Chamber works ===
- Through Fire and Water (violin, piano) 2017
- Give Voice (string orchestra) 2015
- Dance of the Summer Wind (clarinet, piano) 2015
- This Broken Chain (brass quintet) 2014
- Brevis Lux (string orchestra version) 2013
- Improvvisando (trombone, piano) 2010 - Premiered by eklektikos on September 27, 2010.
- Te Deum (flute, clarinet, piano) 2010 - Premiered by eklektikos on September 27, 2010.
- Songs on the Waves (flute, clarinet, trumpet, trombone, piano) 2007 - Premiered by eklektikos on July 15, 2007.
- Come Ye Washed (flute, cello) 2007
- Homage (woodwind quintet) 2007
- Four Snapshots (clarinet, violin, cello, percussion, piano)
- Six Miniatures for Brass Quintet
- Three Hymns (2 flutes)
- Piano Trio No. 1
- Fantasia (trombone, piano)
- Fugue No. 1 (string quartet)
- Fugue No. 2 (string quartet)

=== Vocal works ===
- Night Songs (songs for mezzo-soprano, in progress) 2017
- The Winter Snow (SATB) 2015
- Lost Voices (SSA) 2014 - Premiered by Sirens Choir on April 28, 2014.
- Brevis Lux (SATB) 2013
- Still (voice, piano) 2013
- Lament and Hope (bass/baritone voice, flute, clarinet, bass clarinet, violin, cello, bass, percussion, piano)
- The Most of It (alto voice, piano)
- Songs of Innocence, Songs of Experience (2 sopranos, flute, cello, piano)
- Psalm 54 (SATB, organ/piano)
- Born in Bethlehem (SSA)
- Christmas Carol (SSA)
- Barbara Allen (English Folksong)

=== Works for large ensemble ===
- As I Walk (part of Cantata for Canada 150) 2017 - Commissioned by the PEI Symphony Orchestra. Premiered on February 1, 2015.
- Respect, Reflect, Connect (junior high school band) 2016 - Premiered by Queen Charlotte Intermediate School Band.
- Blue Waves, Yellow Sun (wind symphony) 2016
- Black Night and Dreams of White (wind symphony) 2015
- Abegweit, Symphony for an Island (orchestra, folk fiddle) 2014 - Commissioned by the PEI Symphony Orchestra. Premiered on February 1, 2015.
- The Place We Call Home (orchestra, soprano voice) 2014
- Canadian Soundscape (orchestra) 2014
- The Red Island Awakes (wind symphony) 2014 - Premiered by Charlottetown Rural High School Senior Concert Band on May 22, 2014.
- ARISE (orchestra) 2013 - Premiered by the PEI Symphony on February 10, 2013.
- Maestoso (wind symphony) 2012
- In Three (orchestra) 2007
- Symphonic Poem (orchestra)
