= Wilfrid Derome =

Canadian forensic scientist (1877–1931)

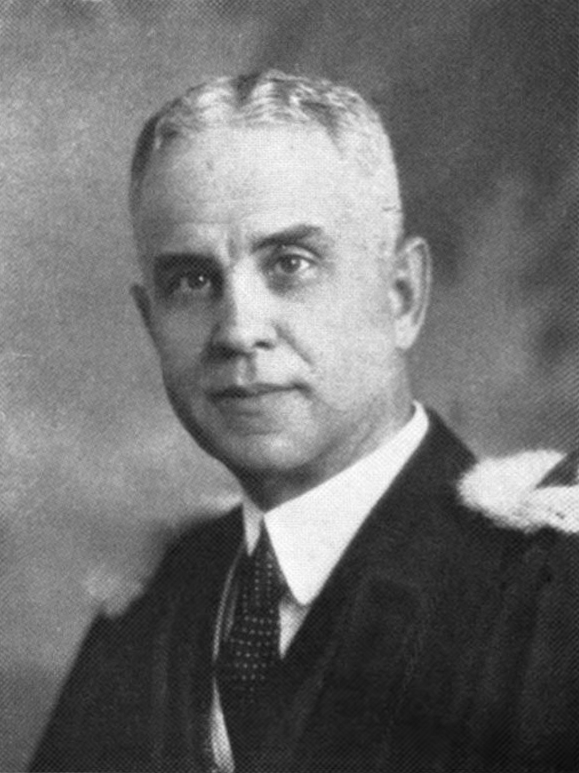
- Born: 19 April 1877; Napierville, Quebec, Canada
- Died: 24 November 1931 (aged 54); Montreal, Quebec, Canada
- Known for: Founder of first forensic science laboratory in North America
- Awards: French Hall of Fame of Criminalistic
- Scientific career
- Fields: Forensic scientist
- Workplaces: Laboratoire des Sciences Judiciaires et de Médecine Légale

Wilfrid Derome (19 April 1877 – 24 November 1931) was a forensic scientist known as the founder of the first forensic science laboratory in North America, founded in Montreal, Quebec, Canada. The laboratory is now called the Laboratoire des Sciences Judiciaires et de Médecine Légale.

== Biography ==
Dr. Derome was born in Napierville, Canada and studied at the College of Montreal, Sainte-Marie College, and Joliette Seminary, where he received the Bachelor of Arts in 1898. Later, he received a doctorate of medicine from Université Laval in Montreal in 1902, interning at Notre Dame Hospital.

During 1908–1909, Dr. Derome studied Legal Medicine at the University of Paris.

During his career, he acted as associate editor the American Journal of Police Science, contributing two articles during 1930. He was a member of the International Association for Identification and the Société de médecine légale de France.

He died from uremia in Montreal on 24 November 1931.

== Work ==
In 1910, Dr. Derome was appointed Professor of Legal Medicine and Toxicology at the University of Montreal and became head of the Laboratory of Notre Dame Hospital.

He founded, in June 1914, the first governmental forensic science laboratory in North America in Montreal, Quebec, Canada. He acted as the Director of the lab until his death in 1931 at the age of 54. He testified as Medical Expert and Ballistic Expert to the Crown in many legal cases during his career.

In 1922, he became the first Expert in North America to testify in front of the Court on the determination of ethyl alcohol in the blood. In 1926, Dr. Derome invented the microspherometer which can reveal the marks left on the surface of bullets fired from a firearm for the purpose of identification. This discovery allowed to present scientific evidence in Court for the first time in ballistics.

In 1929 and 1932, the Derome laboratory was visited by J. Edgar Hoover, from the FBI, in order to plan the foundation of the FBI laboratory.

== Human remains ==
Derome retained dozens of human remains from the bodies of murder victims that he attended to in his role as the province's leading forensic scientist, which included removing tattoos from the body of a murdered woman named Mildred Brown. He also kept parts of men and women's reproductive systems, internal and external organs, and fetuses at varying stages of development. This collection of human remains are legally owned by the provincial Ministry of Public Security and, between 1997 and 2020, were held at the Museum of Civilization in Quebec City.

== Awards ==
- 2001 – Quebec Government named the building that housed the Forensic science Laboratory and the headquarters of the Sûreté du Québec by his name: Building Wilfrid Derome
- 2011 - French Hall of Fame of Criminalistic (Association Québécoise de Criminalistique, Canada)

== Books ==
- Derome, W., Précis de médecine légale, Cie d'imprimerie des Marchands, Montreal, Quebec, Canada, 1920
- Derome, W., Lieu du crime, 1928
- Derome, W., Expertises en armes à feu, Impr. alliés syndicats cathol.-nationaux, Montreal, Quebec, Canada, 1929

== Sources ==
- American Journal of Police Science, 1931.
