= Jordan Nobles =

Canadian composer (born 1969)

- Born: December 11, 1969 (age 56); Surrey, British Columbia, Canada
- Genres: Contemporary classical
- Occupation: Composer
- Years active: 1996–present
- Website: jordannobles.com

Jordan Nobles (born December 11, 1969) is a Canadian composer who specializes in creating spatial music and open instrumentation compositions. His music is performed worldwide and has won several international and national awards including the 2017 Juno Award for Classical Composition of the Year.

== Early life and education ==
Nobles was born in Surrey, British Columbia, and grew up in Edmonton and Beaverlodge, Alberta; and Kelowna and Vancouver, British Columbia. He studied at Grant MacEwan University (1988–1991) and Simon Fraser University.

== Career ==
Nobles is a founding artistic director of Vancouver's Redshift Music Society, an organization founded in 2001 which commissions and premieres new works by Canadian and international composers, and of Redshift Records, the recording division of Redshift Music, which released its first CD in 2007 and now has approximately 40 releases, focussing on contemporary music.

In addition to winning the 2017 Juno for Classical Composition of the Year, Nobles won the SOCAN Jan V. Matejcek New Classical Music Award in 2017, the 2017 Western Canadian Music Award for Classical Composition of the Year, and the 2017 Barbara Pentland Award of Excellence from the Canadian Music Centre.

== Style ==
Nobles' music is spatial and immersive, with the musicians surrounding the audience. It is often composed to be performed in atypical locations including an underground concrete bunker, atriums, rotundas, a swimming pool, the Vancouver Public Library building and other large open reverberant spaces.

== Selected works ==
- Lux Antiqua (2011)
- Simulacrum (2012)
- Möbius (2015)
- Immersion (2016)
- Cinquanta (2018)

== Discography ==
- Undercurrents, Redshift Records TK424 (2011)
- Immersion, Redshift Records TK441 (2016)
- Surface Tension, Redshift Records TK451 (2017)
- Möbius, Redshift Records TK462 (2018)
- Fingerpainting, Redshift Records TK463 (2018)
- Rosetta Stone, Redshift Records TK461 (2018)
- Infinity Mirror, Redshift Records TK471 (2019)
- Chiaroscuro, Redshift Records TK477 (2020)

== Awards and nominations ==
=== JUNO Awards ===
Classical Composition of the Year

- Won: Immersion (2017)

=== Western Canadian Music Awards ===
Classical Composition of the Year

- Won: Immersion (2017)

Classical Composer of the Year

- Nominated: (2018)

=== Other awards ===
Jan V. Matejcek Award from SOCAN in recognition of "overall success in 'New Classical Music'"

- Won: 2017

Canadian Music Centre, BC Region - Barbara Pentland Award of Excellence for his "extraordinary contribution to Canadian Music"

- Won: 2017

Polyphonos International Composition Competition (Seattle, WA)

- Won: 2011

Mayor's Arts Awards (Vancouver, BC)

- Named the "2009 Emerging Artist in Music" (2009)

== See also ==
- 2017 Juno Awards winners Juno Awards of 2017
