= Albert Thomas DeRome =

American painter (1885–1959)

- Born: 1885; San Luis Obispo, California, U.S.
- Died: 1959 (aged 73–74)
- Occupation: Painter

Albert Thomas DeRome (1885–1959) was an American oil and watercolor painter from California. He was the subject of a retrospective exhibition at the Grace Hudson Museum in 2005.
