= Queer Arts Festival =

Multi-disciplinary arts festival

The Queer Arts Festival is a multi-disciplinary arts festival produced annually in Vancouver, British Columbia.

The festival is produced by the Pride In Art Society (PiA). The mission of the Pride in Art Society, a not for profit organization, is to promote the production and exhibition of queer art. The Pride in Art Society creates opportunities for dialogue between queer artists from different disciplines, encourages visibility and appreciation of queer art and artists through the presentation of events, including the Queer Arts Festival.

The QAF started as a small community art exhibit and has grown to include components from theatre, cabaret, erotica, dance, music, spoken word, and comedy. The Queer Arts Festival programs events in partnership with other Vancouver LGBT groups including Screaming Weenie Productions, the Vancouver Pride Festival and the Vancouver Queer Film Festival.

Pride In Art (PiA) began in 1998 as a collective of LGBT visual artists mounting a community art exhibition. In its early years, PiA focused primarily on the visual arts, occasionally presenting performing arts as well within the exhibition space. In 2006, the festival expanded into other disciplines and art forms presented as part of the Queer Arts Festival. The current Artistic Director is Mark Takeshi McGregor who succeeded co-founder SD Holman in 2021.

== Mission statement ==
The Pride in Art Society fosters inclusion, equality and a strong political voice for the local queer community, including the historical contributions of queer artists. We combat homophobia by building greater public awareness and acceptance of individuals and groups outside sexual and gender norms.

== 2010 ==
The theme for the visual art in the 2010 Queer Arts Festival was "Queertopia: The Best Place On Earth?". Artists were asked to imagine the ultimate queer community.

Performing artists include pianist Sara Davis Buechner; JODAIKO taiko drummers; comedians James Howell and Morgan Brayton; and a number of local and international guest performers.

== 2015 ==
In 2015, Vancouver’s Queer Arts Festival showed an exhibition based on the lesbian art collective, Kiss & Tell. Kiss & Tell's groundbreaking 1998 exhibition Drawing the Line was used as inspiration for the 2015 exhibition titled Trigger: Drawing the Line in 2015. The show displayed photographs from the original exhibition alongside new work made by contemporary artists in response to Kiss & Tell's iconic images. The curator, SD Holman, invited Vancouver artists including Afuwa, Bryan Bone, James Diamond, Suzo Hickey, Toni Latour, Jono Nobles, Coral Short, and Jonny Sopotiuk to participate, and the resulting works explored themes like queerness, sexuality, religion, and disability.
