= Owen Underhill =

Canadian composer and flutist

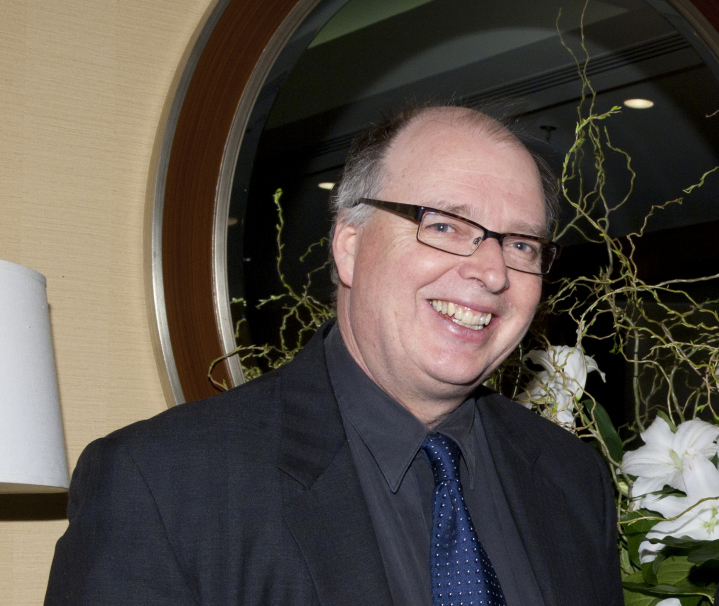
Underhill in 2009

Owen Underhill (born January 26, 1954) is a Canadian composer, flutist and conductor based in Vancouver. He is currently a professor of music at Simon Fraser University. He has been an active contributor to the new music scene on the West Coast, as a flutist, as co-music director of Western Front New Music (1982-3), as the artistic director (1987–2000) of the Vancouver New Music Society, and as a conductor in Magnetic Band and the Turning Point Ensemble, for which he is also currently the Artistic Co-Director.

== Early life and education ==
Underhill studied composition at the University of Victoria with Rudolf Komorous. He completed his master's at Stony Brook University under Bülent Arel. He studied analysis at the Darmstadt Ferienkurse für Neue Musik in 1978, and computer sound synthesis at MIT in 1979.

== Career ==
Underhill was a visiting composer 1976-7 at Wilfrid Laurier University in Waterloo where he taught from 1977–81, creating a composition program and founding an electronic music studio. Since 1981, he has taught at Simon Fraser University in Burnaby.

In 1994 Underhill won first prize in the Winnipeg Symphony's Canadian Composer Competition. In 2000 he released an album of his own compositions, Celestial Machine.

In 2012 Underhill's compositions were featured in the album Still Image – Music by Owen Underhill, performed by the Quatuor Bozzini ensemble along with François Houle and Jeremy Berkman .

The Turning Point Ensemble, with Underhill as conductor, released the album Curio Box in 2018.

== Selected works ==
- The Celestial Machine (1988)
- Lines of Memory (1993)
- Hinge (1996)
- Cantilena (2002)
- The Star Catalogues (1994)
- Orpheus (2002)
- World of Light (2007)
- Trombone Walking (2010)
