= Down and Outlaws =

American rock and roll band

Down And Outlaws
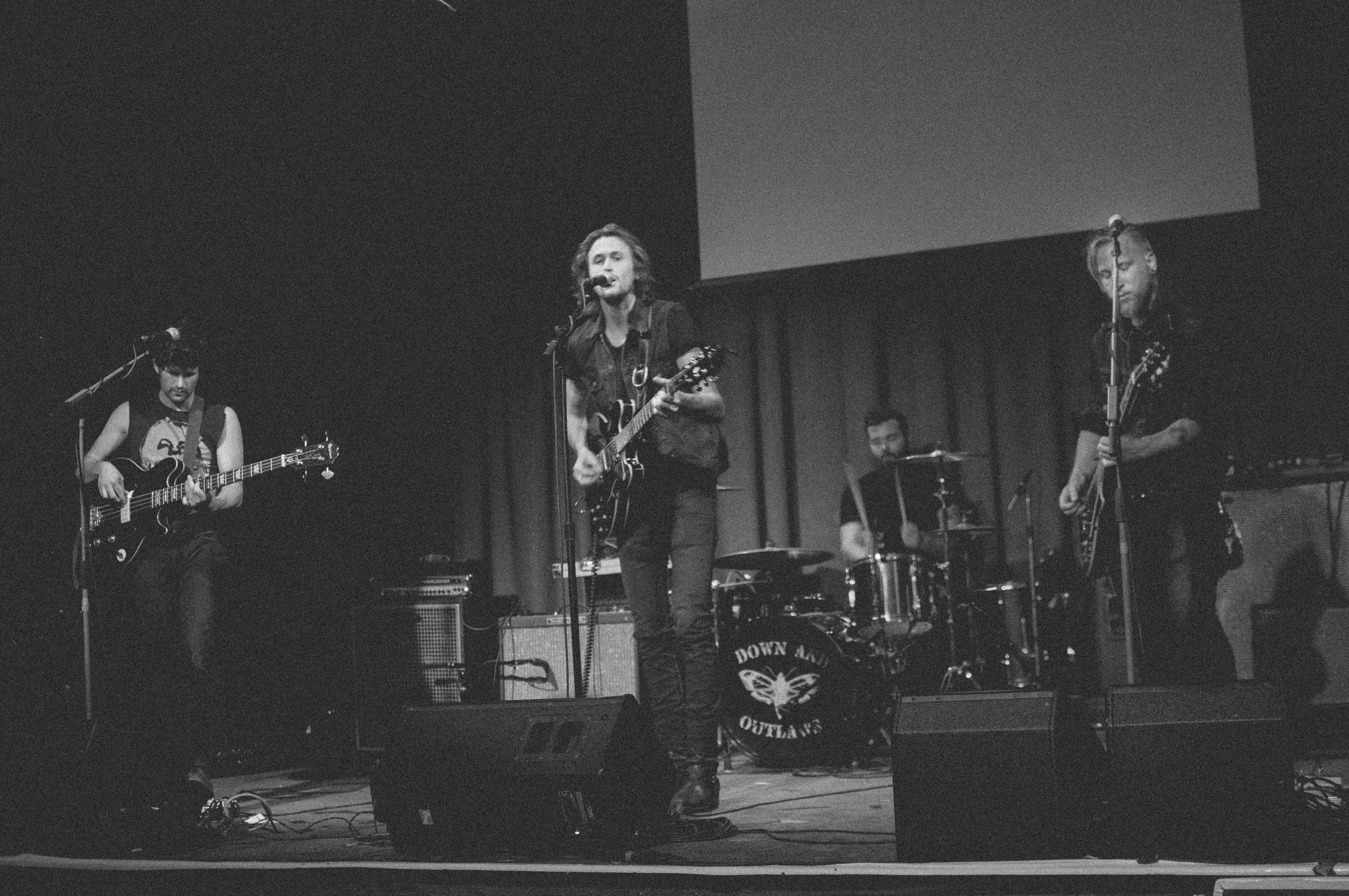

Background information
- Origin: San Francisco, California, United States
- Genres: Alternative rock; garage rock; hard rock
- Years active: 2010–2019
- Labels: A Diamond Heart Production
- Members: Peter Danzig; Chris Danzig; Kyle Luck; Jon Carr
- Website: www.downandoutlaws.com

Down and Outlaws is a four-piece rock and roll band based in San Francisco, California.

== History ==
Down and Outlaws was formed by Peter Danzig (lead vocals and guitar), C.W. Danzig (bass guitar), Kyle Luck (guitar) and Jon Carr (drums) in San Francisco, California in 2013.

The band recorded its debut album Above Snakes at Dave Grohl's Studio 606 (Sound City) in December 2014, with help from producer John 'Lou' Lousteau (Foo Fighters, Teenage Time Killers, Fear, Against Me!, Iggy Pop And The Stooges) and Vanessa Silberman. The debut album was released on July 8, 2016 at The Great American Music Hall. The track "Obsession" was debuted by Guitar Player.

Down and Outlaws made their national television debut on Last Call with Carson Daly.

In September 2015 the band recorded the single "All is Well" with Converse Rubber Tracks Global in Vancouver at The Warehouse Studio with Jason Finkel(Green Day, Kanye West, Yellowcard).

The band has toured and played with acts including: Billy Idol, The Stone Foxes, Reignwolf, Black Pistol Fire, The Silent Comedy, Cancer Bats, Alex Mass of The Black Angels (band).

Down and Outlaws have played festivals including South by Southwest, Echo Park Rising, and most recently, Outside Lands Music and Arts Festival (LCD Soundsystem, Radiohead, Lana Del Rey).

== Discography ==
=== Studio albums ===
- Above Snakes (A Diamond Heart Production 2016)
- Gas Money (2019)

=== Extended plays ===
- Backwards from the Dead (2013)

=== Singles ===
- All is Well (Converse Rubber Tracks Global 2015)
