= Julie-Anne Derome =

Canadian musician

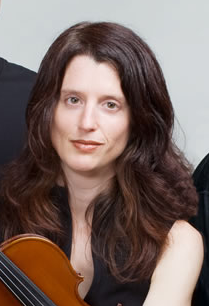

Background information
- Born: Montreal, Quebec, Canada
- Genres: Classical
- Occupation: Violinist
- Instrument: Violin
- Website: www.julieannederome.net

Julie-Anne Derome is a Canadian violinist who was born in Montreal, Quebec.

== Early life and education ==
Julie-Anne Derome started playing the violin at the age of three. She has studied with Taras Gabora and Sonia Jelinkova at the Montreal Conservatoire, Christopher Rowland at the Royal Northern College of Music in the UK and Mitchell Stern at the Hartt School in the USA.

== Awards and recognition ==
- Virginia Parker Prize 2003
- Loan of a Pressenda violin from the Canada Council for the Arts instrument bank from 2003–2006
- Loan of a Rocca violin from the Canada Council for the Arts instrument bank from 2000–2003
- Loan of an Amati violin from the Royal Northern College of Music from 1992–1995
- Prix opus in 2001 with Trio Fibonacci (shining abroad )
- Mendelssohn Trust Award, UK, in 1995
- Special prize for "Anthèmes" by Pierre Boulez at the Yehudi Menuhin competition, Paris, France in 1991

== Career ==
Julie-Anne Derome prioritizes a scintillating technique, a rigorous bow and original poetic colours.

Julie-Anne Derome gave the world première of the revised version of the Berg Violin Concerto with the symphony orchestra of the RNCM in 1992, which triggered her passion for 20th-century music. She regularly premieres concertos by Canadian composers and solo works with ensembles.

In 1998 Julie-Anne founded the Trio Fibonacci. The group plays music for piano trio of all eras, being particularly recognised for its brilliant performances of contemporary repertoire. The group has played on all continents with the exception of Oceania and premiered over fifty works by Canadian and International composers such as Mauricio Kagel, Enno Poppe, Michael Finnissy, Pascal Dusapin and Jonathan Harvey.

== Partial discography ==
- CD of New Canadian piano trios (Centrediscs Label), 2009
- Trio of composer Benoît Mernier, (Cypres label), 2006
- British music (NMC label, London, Angleterre), 2005
- Monographic CD dedicated to composer Denis Bosse (Cypres label), 2004
- CD dedicated to composer Harry Crowl (Rio Arte label, Brazil), 2003
- Jonathan Harvey (Atma label), 2001
- Anthology of Rio de Janeiro composers (Rio Arte label, Brazil), 2000
- Volando by Isabelle Panneton with SMCQ Ensemble (Atma label, 1999)
- Nouvelle musique montréalaise vol. 2 – (SNE label), 1999
- Corale by Luciano Berio with SMCQ Ensemble (Analekta label), 1997
- « Solo » - Contemporary works for solo violin with world premiere recording of Anthèmes de Pierre Boulez (Atma label), 1996
