= The Dilettantes =

American alternative rock band

- Origin: San Francisco Bay Area, San Francisco, United States
- Genres: Alternative rock
- Labels: Happy Parts
- Members: Brock Galland; Joel Gion; KC Kozak; Nick Marcantonio; Jefferson Parker

The Dilettantes are an American alternative rock band based in San Francisco Bay Area. They consist of Brian Jonestown Massacre member Joel Gion (vocals, tambourines, and maracas), Jefferson Parker (guitar, vocals), Brock Galland (guitar, vocals), KC Kozak (drums), and Nick Marcantonio (bass guitar). To date they have released one studio album, 2007's 101 Tambourines, which received mixed reviews.
