= André Ristic =

Canadian classical pianist and composer (born 1972)

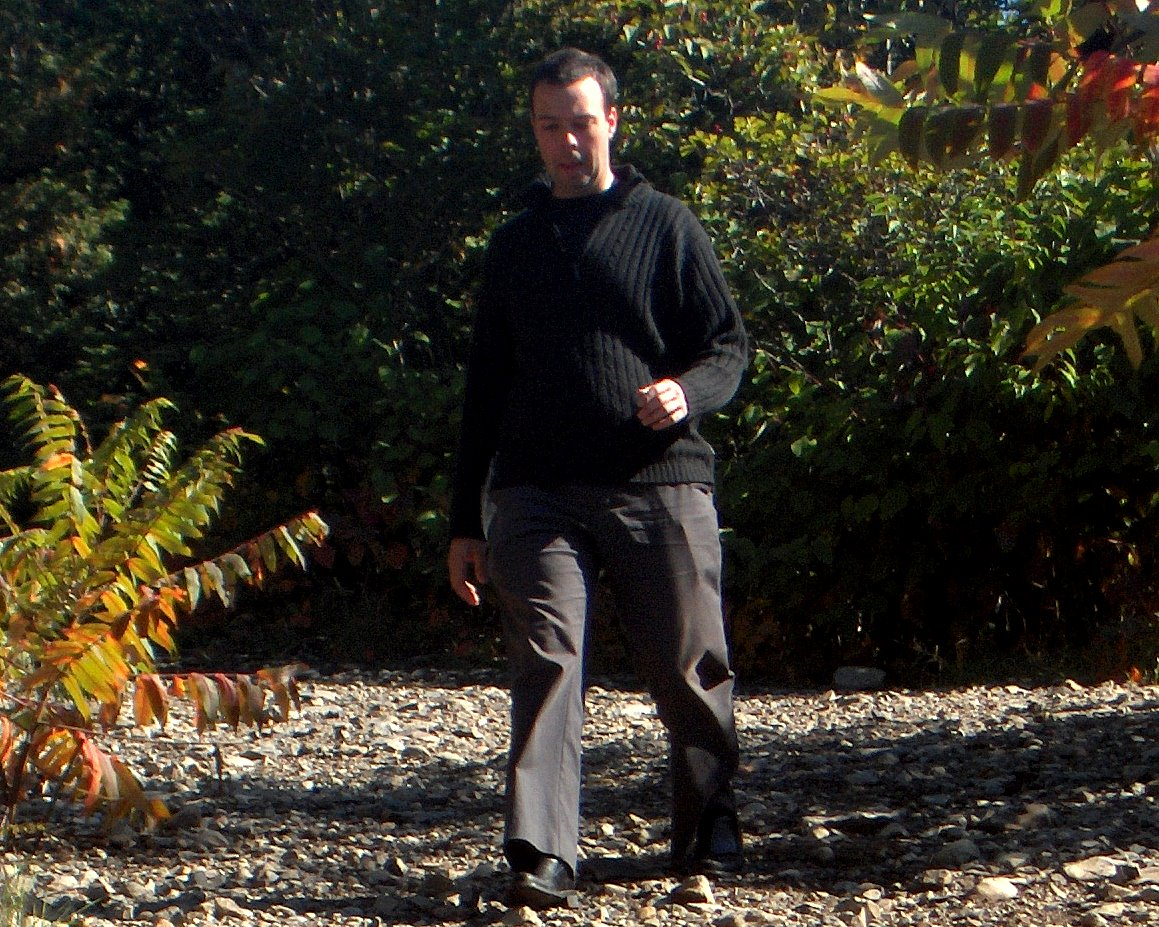
- Ristic in 2005

Background information
- Born: December 19, 1972 (age 53); Quebec City, Canada
- Genres: Classical music
- Occupations: Composer; musician; music theorist
- Instruments: Piano; harpsichord; accordion

André Ristic (born December 19, 1972) is a Canadian composer, pianist, accordion player, and music theorist. He has won several awards, including the Jules Léger Prize for New Chamber Music in 2000 for his work Catalogue de bombes occidentales, the Prix Opus for Composer of the Year in 2002, and the Prix Québec-Flandre in 2003.

== Life and career ==
Born in Quebec City, Ristic's parents originated from Poland and Montenegro. He began his professional studies at the Université du Québec à Montréal in mathematics, and at the Conservatoire de musique du Québec à Montréal, where he studied piano, harpsichord, and musical composition. His background in mathematics has influenced his work as a music theorist, with a particular interest being the mathematical representation of sound. In the early 1990s, he applied himself to research in video synchronisation by the algorithmic numerical analysis of audio data. Later on, the use of mathematical models in his compositions took various forms, usually mixing simple musical material with sophisticated systems such as the Lotka–Volterra equations.

In the mid-1990s, Ristic served as the pianist for the Ensemble contemporain de Montréal. In 1998, he co-founded the chamber ensemble Trio Fibonacci with Gabriel Prynn and Julie-Anne Derome, performing and composing music for the group until 2006. The ensemble notably won the Prix Opus in 2001. As a pianist, he is regularly invited by many contemporary music festivals and Canadian orchestras. He has also commissioned or premiered a number of works from both Canadian and international composers, especially those of his generation.

Ristic played for many years with the KORE Ensemble in Montreal (2000–2007). In 2004, he moved to Brussels to join the piano faculty at the Institut Jaques-Dalcroze (Brussels). Ristic quit the Fibonacci Trio in 2006. In Belgium, he performs with the ensemble Musiques Nouvelles in Mons.
