= Howard Bashaw =

- Born: 1957; White Rock, British Columbia, Canada.
- Occupation: composer

Howard Bashaw (born 1957 in White Rock, Canada) is a composer of acoustic music; and a professor of music at the University of Alberta.

Bashaw graduated as a Master of Music in 1984 and a Doctor of Musical Arts in 1989 from the University of British Columbia. He also attended the Banff Centre for the Arts where he won the Banff Centre Concerto Competition in 1992. He teaches composition, orchestration, music theory and analysis at the University of Alberta, previously having taught at the University of British Columbia, and at the Université Canadienne en France, Nice.

Bashaw composes music for orchestras, ensembles, and piano soloist performances. He has released some of his own work on CD. The Alberta Foundation for the Arts, Canada Council for the Arts, and CBC Radio Music Department have commissioned his work.

Bashaw is an Associate Composer of the Canadian Music Centre and a member of the Canadian League of Composers.

== List of works ==
Piano

- 15 (2012)
- Minimalisms II (2005)
- Form Archimage (2001)
- Preludes Book 2 (2000, revised 2003)
- Preludes Book 1 (1996, revised 2007)
- Hosu (1986, revised 2011)

Chamber

- Music for Trumpet and Piano (2007)
- Music for Alto Saxophone and Piano (2006)
- Music for Trombone and Piano (1998)
- Music for Organ and Piano (1995–96, revised 2007)
- Music for Tuba and Piano (1984, revised 1989)
- 10M-5P-17m (2005) piano, violin, cello, clarinet, percussion
- 4T-XMP-14m (2002) Four Toccatas for Xylophone (or marimba) and Piano
- 12M-4P-15m (2001) piano, violin, cello, clarinet
- Eolian Braid (1995) two pianos, marimba, vibraphone
- seven spheres (1996) piano, clarinet, bass clarinet, trumpet, violin, cello, percussion
- New Rage for Now Age (1996) piano, trumpet, trombone, percussion, saxophone
- Timepieces (1993, revised 2006) piano, violin, cello, trumpet

Orchestra and large ensemble

- Scratch-Scorch (2008), for Big Band, featuring amplified violin
- TMHRO (2006) Three Movements for the Hard Rubber Orchestra, Big Band, featuring amplified piano
- Concerto for Two Pianos and Two Percussion (1999) with full orchestra
- Minimalisms (2003) 14 instruments – chamber concerto for piano and percussion
- Music for the Cycle of Strength (2003) for 14 instruments
- Double Entente (2002) for 13 instruments – featuring tuba and trombone
- Horos (1994) 6 guitars and 6 double basses, or 1 guitar and 1 double bass with recorded tracks

Voice

- Seven St. Maur Poems (2008) for soprano, violin, cello, piano and percussion
- The Chapel (2007) for SATB choir
