= James Harley =

Canadian composer, author and professor of music

- Occupations: Composer, author, professor of music

James Harley (born 1959) is a Canadian composer, author, and professor of music born in Vernon, British Columbia. His creative output consists of orchestral, chamber, solo, electroacoustic, and vocal music.

== Studies ==
Harley studied at Western Washington University (B.Mus., magna cum laude, 1977–1982), Royal Academy of Music (1983–1985), Université de Paris (1986–1987), Fryderyk Chopin Academy of Music, Warsaw (1987–1988), and McGill University (D.Mus., 1988–1994).

== Teaching ==
He has taught at the Faculty of Music at McGill University (1989–1995), Wilfrid Laurier University (1995–1996), California Institute of the Arts (1997), University of Southern California (1997), and Minnesota State University Moorhead (1999–2004). In 2004, he took up a tenure-track position in music at University of Guelph, where he is associate professor.

Harley is also the author of the book Xenakis: His Life in Music. His areas of expertise and specialization include digital music, composition, contemporary music analysis, and history of electronic/computer music. Music and research by James Harley is represented by Art Music Promotion.

== List of works ==
Orchestra

- Along the Riverrun (1983) 10 min.

Version I: 1111/1100/timp/66643
Version II: strings (20220 concertante/66644 orchestra)

- Overture Divertimento (1984) 8 min. 2222/2220/timp/strings
- Windprints (1989) 15 min. 2222/4221/3 perc/pf/strings
- Kekula (Memories of a Landscape – III) (1992) 15 min. 2222/4221/strings
- N(ouvelle)aissance (1994) 16 min. 1202/2000/1 perc/44321
- Old Rock (1996) 10 min. 2222/4221/timp/strings

Ensemble

- Sabbath (1981) 20 min. jazz ensemble (5 saxophones, 5 trumpets, 4 trombones, electric guitar, electric bass, piano, drums)
- The Tail of Pinky Oozgreen and the Mossbrains (1983) 20 min. jazz ensemble (5 saxophones, 5 trumpets, 4 trombones, electric guitar, electric bass, piano, drums)
- Stillness Dancing (1983, revised 1984) 10 min. 11 players (1111/1000/1 perc/pf/10111)
- Mobile (1984) 18 min. 10 trombones (8 tenors, 2 bass), 2 percussion
- Prelude (Under the Thin Rainfall) (1985) 7 min. flute, clarinet, horn, harp, violin, cello
- Tapisse(reve)rie (1986) 13 min. 11 players (1111/1110/10111)
- Memories of a Landscape – II (1988) 15 min. 13 strings (44221)
- Daring the Wilderness (1991) 12 min. percussion ensemble (5 players)
- Etude pour une Fete (Jazz II) (1991) 6 min. alto saxophone (or clarinet), trumpet, trombone, cello, double bass, piano
- Neue Bilder (Der Holle Rache) (1991) 10 min. piccolo, oboe, E♭ clarinet, trumpet, percussion, viola, cello, double bass
- Wine of Dragons (1993) 7 min.

Version I: Taiko ensemble – 9 performers
Version II (1997): percussion ensemble (9 players)

- Kaleidarray (Jazz III) (1994) 15 min. violin/bass violin, clarinet/bass clarinet, trumpet, Thai gongs, vibraphone, marimba, piano
- Cuimhneachan Urramach (1995) 15 min. solo cello and 14 players (1111/1110/1 perc/pf/11111)
- Octane-VX (1996) 8 min. flute, oboe, clarinet, bassoon, horn, trumpet, trombone, double bass
- Can(y)on (1997) 3 min. clarinet, trumpet, vibraphone, marimba, piano, violin, double bass
- bien serré (1999) 20 min. jazz ensemble (4 saxophones, 4 trumpets, 4 trombones, electric guitar, electric bass, keyboard, drums)
- KappaMusik (2002) 13 min. jazz ensemble (4 saxophones, 2 trumpets, 2 trombones, 2 electric guitars, drums)
- aXis (2006) 12 min. 13 players (1111/1111/11111)
- soundskein (2006) 15 min. two string quartets

Chamber music

- Images (1983) 17 min. flute, vibraphone, violin, viola, cello
- Encounters – II (1984) 10 min. percussion duo
- String Quartet (1984) 10 min. 2 violins, viola, cello
- Jazz (1985) 7 min. saxophone quartet (soprano, alto, tenor, baritone)
- Here the Bird (1993) 13 min. viola, piano
- Épanoui (1995) 12 min. flute, cello, piano
- Tyee (1995) 13 min. bass flute and percussion
- Consort: Dances of the Borealis (1998) 15 min. two pianos, two percussion
- Cachées (2000) 11 min. guitar and cello
- nmaya (Kokopeli II) (2002) 12 min. percussion and piano
- TreDue Sextet (2010) 10 min. flute, clarinet, marimba/vibraphone, piano, violin, violoncello.

Instrumental

- Exposures (1984) 7 min. horn
- Portrait (1984) 8 min. flute
- Piano (1989) 14 min. piano
- Variations (1989) 21 min. piano
- Song for Nobody (1990) 8 min. B♭ clarinet (alternative version for B♭ bass clarinet with extended low register)
- Ma'dhanah (1990) 12 min. Accordion
- flung loose into the stars (1995) 10 min. piano
- Exh... (1999) 5 min. piccolo
- Édifices (naturels) (2001) 10 min. piano
- pLayer8a (2007) 5 min. player piano

Vocal and choral

- Five Poems by Richard Brautigan (1981) 8 min. mezzo-soprano, flute, cello, percussion, piano
- Soft Morning (1983) 7 min. (text by James Joyce) soprano solo (alternative version for mezzo-soprano)
- Singing a silence of stone (1983) 6 min. (text by e.e. cummings) soprano, harp, 2 percussion
- Two Psalms (1986) 14 min. Lullaby (Psalm 23), Jubilate Domino (Psalm 100) SATB chorus, harp
- Jubilate Domino (Psalm 100) SATB chorus, harp
- Reflections on a Prayer of Saint Augustine (1987) 13 min. (text in Latin from St. Augustine's Confessions, and The Song of Songs) SATB chorus (36 parts, 9 groups)
- one winter after(a flower)noon (1987) 8 min. (text by e.e. cummings). soprano, bass clarinet, cello, piano
- Cantico delle Creature (1993) 23 min. (text by St. Francis of Assisi) mezzo-soprano, choir (SSAATTBB), chamber orchestra (2222/2220/3 perc/piano, celeste/22222), soundfiles
- re: Hallelujah (2005) 5.5 min. (text by Leonard Cohen) soprano and chamber orchestra (1111/1111/perc/piano/11111)

Electroacoustic

- Sonnet Sonore (1985) 14 min. oboe and stereo electroacoustic
- Voyage (1986) 15 min. 4-channel electroacoustic
- Per Foramen Acus Transire (1987) 15 min. flute/bass flute and stereo electroacoustic
- Night-flowering ... not even sand – I (1989) 12 min. bassoon and electroacoustic
- Night-flowering ... not even sand – II (1990) 9 min. stereo electroacoustic
- Spangled (1996) 5 min. stereo electroacoustic
- Jardinages – I (2000) 6 min. electric guitar and tape
- Jardinages – II (2000) 6 min. stereo electroacoustic
- On Frogs (2000) 13 min. reciter, interactive electronics (3 players)
- Anasazi: Kokopeli I (2001) 11 min. amplified piccolo and electronics
- Xmix (2001) 12 min. stereo electroacoustic
- Chaotika (2001) 12 min. percussion and interactive electronics
- jem (2003) 3 min. 4-channel electroacoustic
- Wild Fruits: Prologue (2004) 16 min. 8-channel electroacoustic (alternate version with slides)
- Wild Fruits: Installation (2004) open duration keyboard controller, sampler, stereo electroacoustic
- Mashup: Derome vs Oliveros (2005) 7 min. stereo electroacoustic
- Wild Fruits 2: like a ragged flock, like pulverized jade (2006) 11 min. amplified alto flute, live electronics, 8-channel electracoustic
- blueBob (Dylan Remix) (2006) 5 min. stereo electroacoustic
- Ariel Fragments (2007) 17 min. SSSAAA choir, 8-channel electroacoustic
- pLayer8b (2008) 5 min. 8-channel electroacoustic
- re:Nude (2008) 4.5 min. stereo electroacoustic
- re:Nude:ty (2008) 1 min. stereo electroacoustic
- Wild Fruits 3: Chestnuts (2008) 13 min. 8-channel electroacoustic
- re:Reckoner (2009) 4.5 min. stereo electroacoustic
- Duol (2009) 7 min. violin, guitar, soundfiles
- Raindown (MegMix) (2009) 4.5 min. stereo electroacoustic

Educational music

- Dance Set (2009) 8 min. two cellos, Grade 4 level

Music theatre

- Scenes From a Theatre on Mars (1984) 15 min. (Text: James Harley, adapted from The Last Days of Mankind by Karl Kraus) 2 speaking/acting roles (1 male, 1 female), 2 cl (2nd doubles sax), tp/flugel, vn/vl, vc.

== Affiliations ==
James Harley is an Associate Composer of the Canadian Music Centre, and a board member of the Canadian League of Composers. He is also a member of the American Composers Forum, the Canadian Electroacoustic Community, and the International Computer Music Association.

== Selected performers ==
Arraymusic, Codes d'Accès, Composers' Orchestra, Continuum, Corey Hamm Marc Couroux, ECM, Hammerhead Consort, Kappa, Kore, Kovalis Duo, Duo Vira, Groundswell, Hammerhead Consort, Lafayette String Quartet, McGill Contemporary Music Ensemble, McGill Symphony Orchestra, Elizabeth McNutt, New Music Concerts, Patricia O'Callahan, Oshawa-Durham Symphony, Open Ears Festival, Penderecki String Quartet, Polish Society for New Music, Brigitte Poulin, Prince George Symphony, Ben Reimer, SMCQ, Transmission, Trio Phoenix, Trio Fibonacci, Alain Trudel, University of Guelph Women's Chamber Choir, Vancouver Bach Choir, Ellen Waterman.
