= Paul Steenhuisen =

Canadian composer (b.1965)

Paul Steenhuisen (born 1965 in Vancouver, British Columbia) is a Canadian composer working with a broad range of acoustic and digital media. His concert music consists of orchestral, chamber, solo, and vocal music, and often includes live electronics and soundfiles. He creates electroacoustic, radio, and installation pieces. Steenhuisen's music is regularly performed and broadcast in Europe, Asia, Australia, and North America. He contributes all audio content and programming to the Hyposurface installation project, based in Cambridge, Massachusetts.

== Education ==
Steenhuisen obtained his Doctor of Musical Arts degree in composition from the University of British Columbia, where he studied with Keith Hamel. Between academic degrees, he studied with Louis Andriessen and Gilius van Bergeijk at the Royal Conservatory of The Hague. While living in Amsterdam, he worked with Michael Finnissy in Hove, England. He was one of ten composers selected to take part in the Cursus de Composition et Informatiques at IRCAM (Paris, 1996/97), where he had lessons with Tristan Murail. He attended master classes and individual lessons with Mauricio Kagel, Helmut Lachenmann, Jean-Claude Risset, Luciano Berio, Pierre Boulez, Brian Ferneyhough, Frederic Rzewski, Magnus Lindberg, and others.

== Career ==
During his student years, Steenhuisen was laureate of more than a dozen national and international awards for his music. These include four prizes in the Canadian Broadcasting Corporation Young Composers Competition, seven in the PROCAN/SOCAN Competition, first prize in the Vancouver New Music Composers Competition, and the Governor General of Canada Gold Medal as the outstanding student in all faculties (UBC, 1990). Music by Steenhuisen was selected for competition at the Gaudeamus Music Week. After a winter residency at the Banff Centre for the Arts, Steenhuisen became Associate Composer in Residence with the Toronto Symphony Orchestra (1998–2000). At the behest of the TSO, he wrote the chamber work Ciphering in Tongues, and orchestral pieces Airstream and Pensacola (a melodrama for orchestra, computer, and spatialized brass). Pensacola has been performed by the Esprit Orchestra, Montreal Symphony Orchestra, and the Winnipeg Symphony Orchestra. During this time, Bramwell Tovey and the Vancouver Symphony Orchestra commissioned another orchestral piece, Your Soul is a Bottle Full of Thirsting Salt.

Wonder, for orchestra, tape, and soprano, was commissioned by the CBC for the CBC Radio Orchestra, and was selected to represent Canada at the International Rostrum of Composers (UNESCO, Paris). It was ranked third in the world, and ascribed the honour of recommended work, with subsequent broadcasts in twenty-five countries. As a result, the Austrian Radio Philharmonic performed the work and commissioned Bread for Sylvain Cambreling and Klangforum Wien to perform at MuzikProtokoll in Graz, Austria. Bread was also performed at the 2001 ISCM World Music Days in Yokohama, Japan, by the Tokyo Ensemble COmeT, and at the BONK festival (Tampa, Florida), where Steenhuisen was a frequent guest. In 2003, Dr. Steenhuisen was appointed assistant professor of composition at the University of Alberta, where he was the founder of the Electroacoustic Research Studios (UA-EARS). He served as director of the new studios until his resignation in 2007. In early 2009, the University of Alberta Press published its first music text, Steenhuisen's Sonic Mosaics: Conversations with Composers, a collection of interviews with thirty-two composers.

In 2011 Steenhuisen was awarded the Victor Martyn Lynch Staunton Award as the outstanding mid-career artist in music by the Canada Council.

== Affiliations ==
Steenhuisen is an associate composer of the Canadian Music Centre, served on the Council of the Canadian League of Composers (2000–2008), and was president of the International Society for Contemporary Music, Canadian Section (2003–2008). He serves on the editorial board of the World New Music Magazine.

== Writing ==
Since 1987, Paul Steenhuisen has made contributions to numerous magazines and journals, including Discorder (CiTR Radio, Vancouver), MusicWorks, Circuit, Wholenote Magazine, Anjelaki: Journal of the Theoretical Humanities, Contemporary Music Review, and others. Sonic Mosaics: Conversations with Composers (UA Press, 2009) is a 314-page collection of interviews with composers.

== Works ==
Orchestral
Pensacola (2001/2002) Orchestra, spatialized brass, computer
Your Soul is a Bottle Full of Thirsting Salt (2001) large orchestra
Airstream (1999) orchestra
Wonder (1996) orchestra, tape, soprano
Exegesis (1990) string orchestra

Ensemble
Intaglio sulla cervello (2010) piano trio
Copralite Culture and Analysis Results #1–20 (2008–09) percussion and piano
Material / Ultramaterial (2005) eight instruments and soundfiles
Sommes-nous pilotées par nos genes? (2005) septet
Vorwissen (2004) piano trio
Hobo Action Figures (2003) jazz quintet and soundfiles
Bread (1999) thirteen instruments and soundfiles
Ciphering in Tongues (1998) twelve instruments
Mycenaean Wound (1992) quintet
Your Golden Hair Margarethe ... (1991) two violas
Corpus Inconnu (1991) octet

Solo
Revolutions per Minute (2009–2010)
Every Joy Pop Turbo (2008–09) piano
Toneland Security (2005) bass flute
Recipes for the Common Man (2001) oboe and CD
Cette obscure clarté qui tombe des étoiles (2000) flute and CD
Pomme de terre (1999) piccolo or E-flat clarinet
Now Is a Creature (1997, revised 2003) trombone and live electronics
Plea (1995) piano
Huskless (Freedman Etudes) (1994) 12' bass clarinet
Tract (1992) harp
Foundry (1990) flute
Amaranth (1989) cello

Voice
Les enfers éternels des gens désespérés (2003) four male voices and electronics
A Book From The Harbour, Chapter III (1995) soprano and piano
On a Pin's Point My Love is Spinning (1994) women's choir
A Book From The Harbour, Chapter II (1994) soprano and piano
Between Lips and Lips There Are Cities (1993) two 8-part antiphonal choirs
Millennia (1991) soprano, violin, piccolo
Two Rivers (1989) choir
A Book from the Harbour, Chapter I (1988) soprano and piano

Electroacoustic and installation works
LoK8Tr internet project (2010) audio and video with live telematic improvisation
Blueblood (2008) soundtrack for art installation
Hyposurface Interactive Audio (2007–) architectural installation
dECOi I (2006)
Frank O. Lunaire #10: Raub (2005)
There's a Glacier in our Sink (2004) radio documentary
Circumnavigating the Sea of Shit (1996)
Poland is Not Yet Lost (1992)
Tube Shelter Perspective (1991)
Enclaves intèrieures (1990) three percussionists and tape
Deep Mountain (1989)
