= Great Fire of Quebec City =

Urban conflagration on October 14, 1866 in Quebec City, Canada

The Great Fire of Quebec City or the Fire of 1866 in Quebec City was an urban conflagration that raged on October 14, 1866, in Quebec City, in the Province of Canada. Even more intense than the conflagrations of 1845, this conflagration burned in one day around 2,500 to 3,000 buildings of three faubourgs (Today Saint-Roch and Saint-Sauveur). Seven people died in the conflagration and 20,000 people lost their homes in one day, which makes it the worst catastrophe that the city has ever known.

== Timeline ==
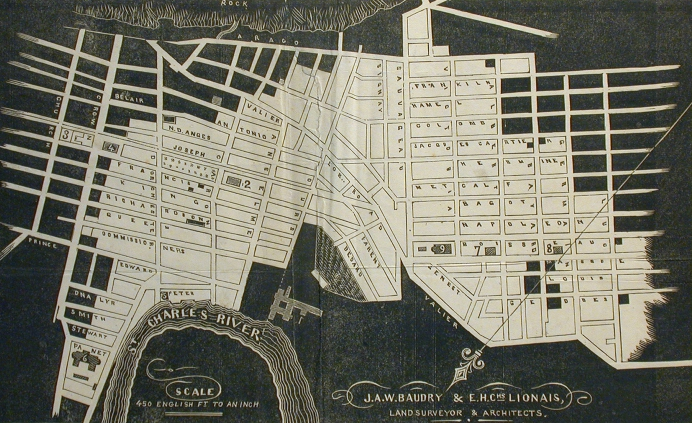
Map of burnt lots

The fire began at 4 a.m. in the home of a grocer of Saint-Joseph Street, right next to the Gabrielle-Roy Library. Firefighters did not have enough water and were unable to control the fire, which began to spread due to a north-easterly wind. The blaze later spread from the Saint-Charles River to the hillside of Sainte-Geneviève. The faubourg Saint-Sauveur was almost completely engulfed in flames by 4 p.m. while Saint-Roch was slightly less affected. At 5 p.m. the fire stopped.

== Gallery ==
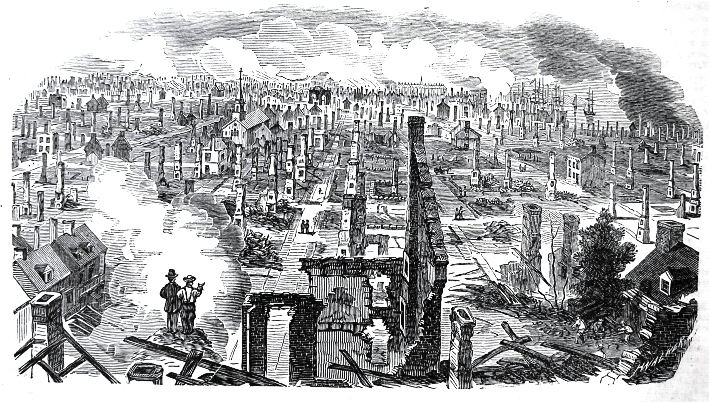
Sketch of John Henry Walker.

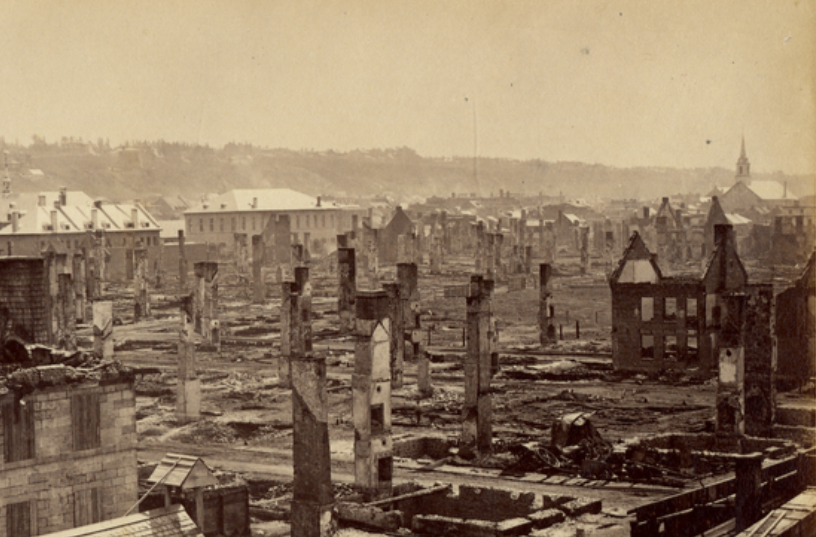
Photograph of William Leggo.

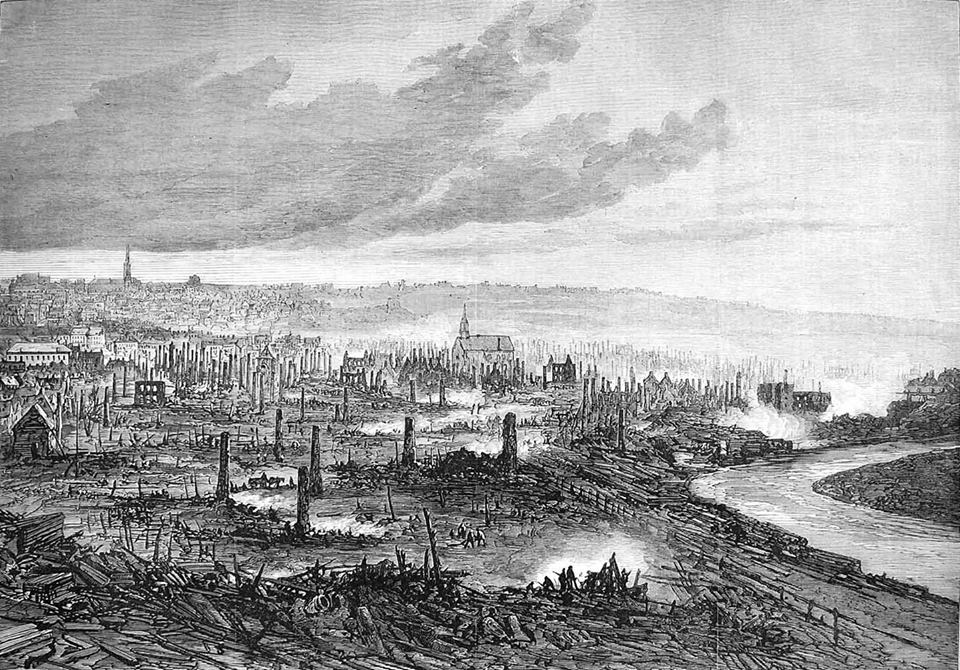
Sketch based on the photograph of William Leggo.
