= Saint-Sauveur, Quebec City =

Neighborhood in Québec City, Canada

Coordinates: 46°48′28″N 71°14′43″W

Saint-Sauveur (French pronunciation: [sɛ̃ sovœʁ]) is one of the 35 neighbourhoods of Quebec City, and one of the six that are situated within the borough of La Cité–Limoilou. It is one of the neighbourhoods which form the Lower Town of Quebec City. The neighbourhood is named after Jean Le Sueur.

== History ==
=== Founding and settlementation ===
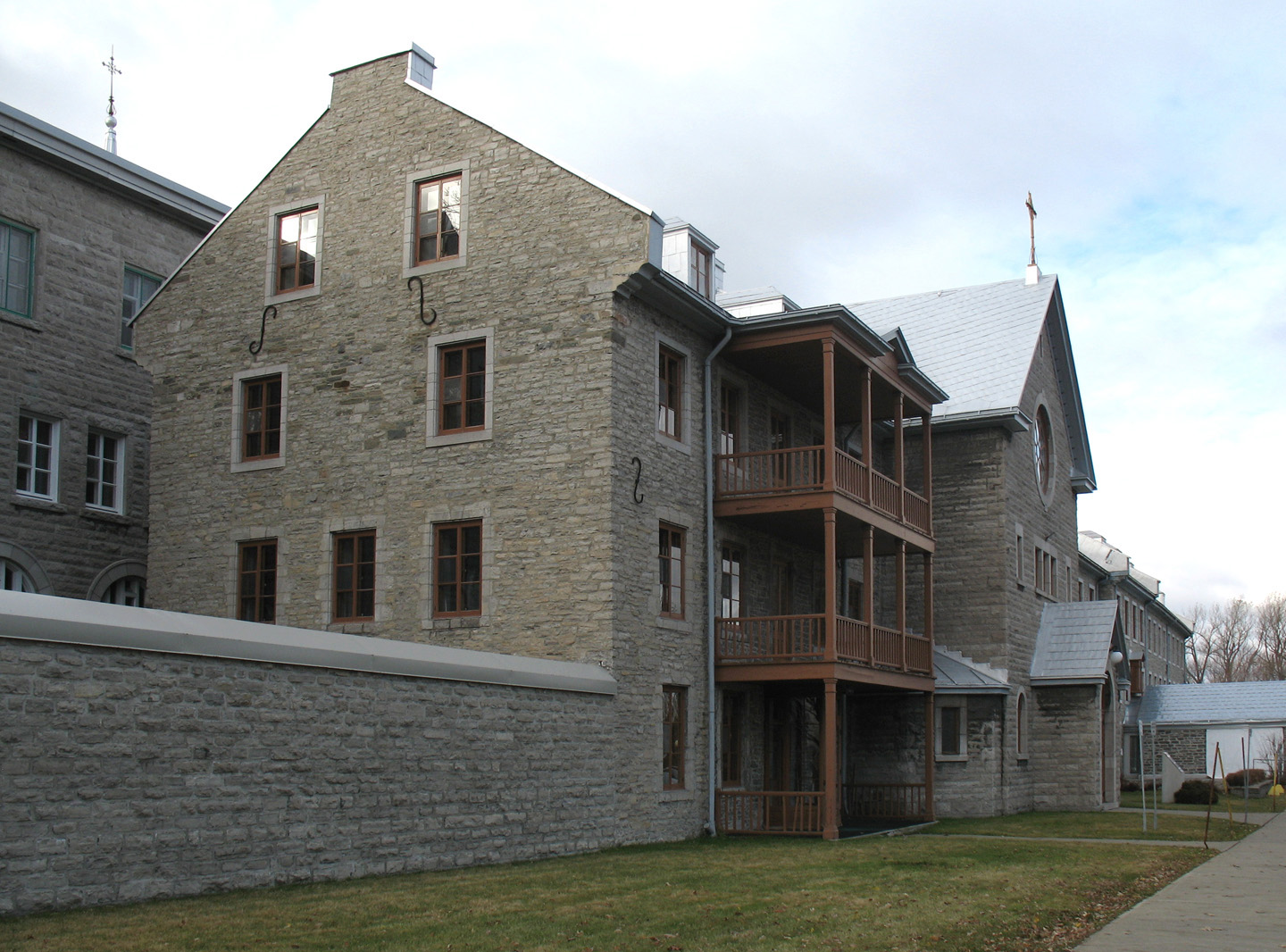
L'Hôpital général de Québec, founded in 1692, is located in the north of the neighbourhood.

In the complete beginning of the French regime, the lowlands of the plain bordering the Saint Charles River, where Saint-Sauveur would be founded, were set aside as communal lands. In 1618, Samuel de Champlain proposed to settle a town named "Ludovica". This project was never realized; the idea was abandoned in around 1638 and a town that would eventually become Vieux-Québec was settled instead around the Fort St. Louis. The land was then granted. In 1653, Jean le Sueur, the first secular priest to come to New France, received a concession from the Hôtel-Dieu de Québec extending to the river the one he already owned on the hillside. Jean le Sueur was previously the priest of Saint-Sauveur-de-Thury-Harcourt in Normandy, and was nicknamed "Monsieur de Saint-Sauveur" (Mister of Saint-Sauveur). The neighbourhood owes its name to him; his nickname extended to the land he owned, which were the eastern and western boundaries of the Durocher and Montmagny streets respectively.

The Recollects arrived in Quebec in 1615 and were granted a concession on the banks of the Saint Charles River. Their land stretched from the Sainte-Geneviève hill to the river, between what are now the Caron and Mazenod streets. They built a chapel and convent dedicated to Notre-Dame-des-Anges. Chased out of Quebec in 1629 by David Kirke, they did not return until 1670. They rebuilt a convent and chapel, which still exist today, as part of the Hôpital général.

The faubourg, which at the time formed part of the suburbs of Quebec City, was initially sparsely populated. In the 1840s, the neighbourhood is split into 4 big properties. The fief of the Recollects, which belonged to the Hôpital Général, along with the Domaine Bois-Bijou (Boisseauville), the land of the Hôtel-Dieu, and one plot which belonged to the Ursulines.

In circa 1845, Boisseauville was founded as a result of surveying work. In the beginning, the Domaine Bois-Bijou was owned by Michel Sauvageau; it included a villa surrounded by a large garden, several barns and a pond. Michel Sauvageau had the first subdivision plan drawn up in 1810, and the first row of building lots was established on rue Sauvageau, towards the Faubourg Saint-Jean. After his death, Pierre Boisseau proceeded to subdivide the land on which Boisseauville would be built.

This was followed by the construction of the first church and a town hall.

=== Working-class neighbourhood and urban development ===
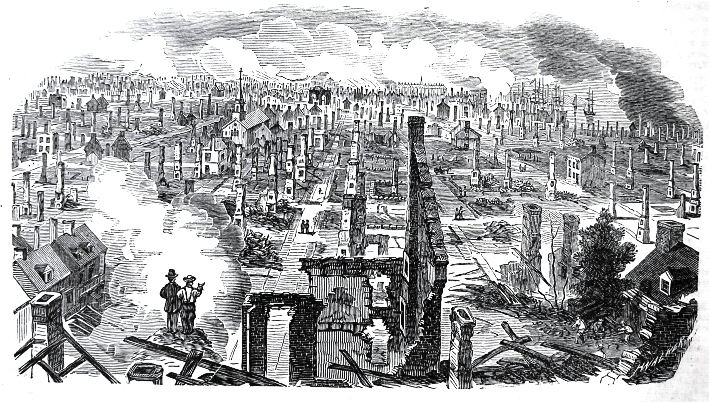
The neighbourhood was razed in 1866 by the Great Fire of Quebec.

Near the beginning of the 19th century, the success of the shipyards, timber trade and port activity led to the rapid development of Saint-Sauveur. The high demand for labour led to the construction of a large number of houses. Since 1840, Saint-Sauveur had become home to a large number of poor workers, because the building regulations in this area allowed for the construction of houses that were not fireproof. From 1845, Saint-Sauveur was considered a suburb of Quebec City. The fire that destroyed Saint-Roch in 1845 caused the population to migrate to Boisseauville.

The new municipal code of 1855 forced the small villages and towns of Quebec to assign themselves a municipality. Saint-Sauveur was grouped together with Limoilou to form a municipality known as the "suburb of Saint-Roch" until 1862. From a religious perspective, the Archbishop of Quebec transformed what had been a service of the parish of Saint-Roch into a fully-fledged parish in 1853. He entrusted its management to the congregation of the Missionary Oblates of Mary Immaculate. The neighbourhood obtained an autonomous municipal charter in 1862, and changed its official name from Saint-Roch Nord (North Saint-Roch) to Saint-Sauveur in 1872.

In 1866, Saint-Sauveur was razed by the Great Fire of Quebec City. That same year, the Langelier Boulevard was enlarged to prevent the fire from spreading between Saint-Roch and Saint-Sauveur.

In 1888, the Marché Saint-Pierre was built on the site of today's Habitations Durocher. Named in the honor of Pierre Boisseau, it became the property of Quebec City when it annexed the village of Saint-Sauveur in 1889. The red brick hall was 51.82 meters long, the same size as Montcalm Hall. It escaped the conflagration of 1889, which razed the neighbourhood to the ground. Closed in 1915, the building was rented out to Œuvres de Jeunesse, it then burned down in 1945.

Another conflagration destroyed 600 homes on May 16, 1889. It was a devastating fire, that nearly destroyed the neighbourhood, and left around 5,000 people homeless.

This reopened the debate on annexing the neighbourhood into Quebec City. The main issue was the installation of a water distribution network, which is essential for fighting fires. Talks between the two municipalities began in June 1889. The citizens of Saint-Sauveur ratified the agreement in a referendum held on September 26 and 27, 1889. The Quebec City authorities moved into the neighbourhood, building sewers and pavements, along with paving and lighting streets.

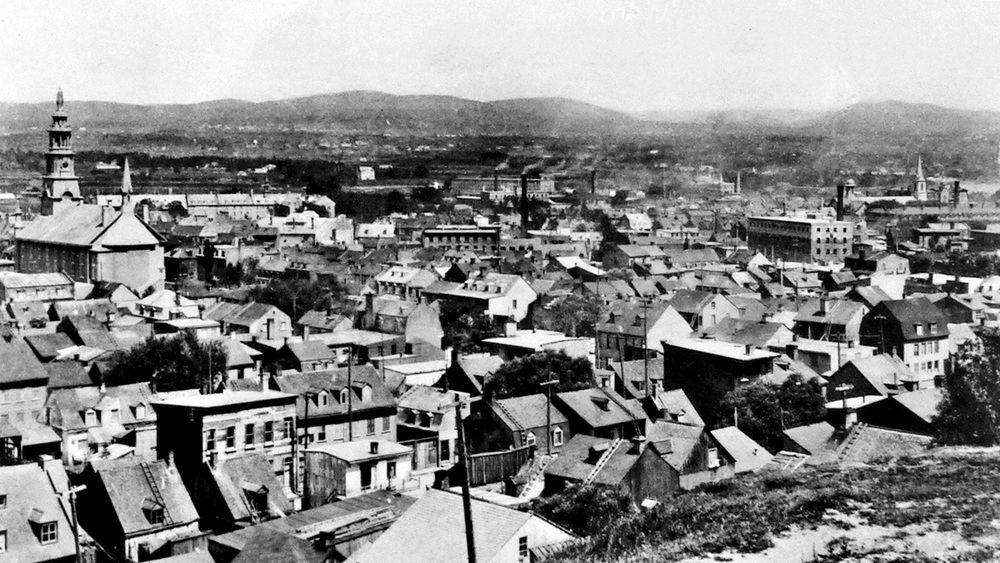
The neighbourhood as seen from the Upper Town, in 1899.

The transformation was quick. Charles Baillargé, the city's engineer, described it as "the most magical transformation any city has ever witnessed". In less than three years, the neighbourhood was catching up with the rest of the city in terms of urban facilities. The neighbourhood extended across Saint-Vallier Street. At the time, Saint-Ours Street, later renamed Langelier Boulevard, was seen as the city's most beautiful thoroughfare.

In 1914, Jules Gingras founds the Laiterie de Québec on Sacré-Cœur Avenue, later to become Laiterie Arctic (named after Captain Joseph-Elzéar Bernier's ship). It is the first dairy company in Quebec to pasteurize its milk. The dairy company later moved to West Charest Boulevard in 1956.

On April 1, 1918, the neighbourhood is a theatre in the Quebec City riot of 1918. That same year, the Spanish flu kills 500 people in Quebec City. 80% of the victims were in the Lower Town, especially in the poorer neighbourhoods. That being, Saint-Sauveur and Saint-Malo.

=== Revitalization ===
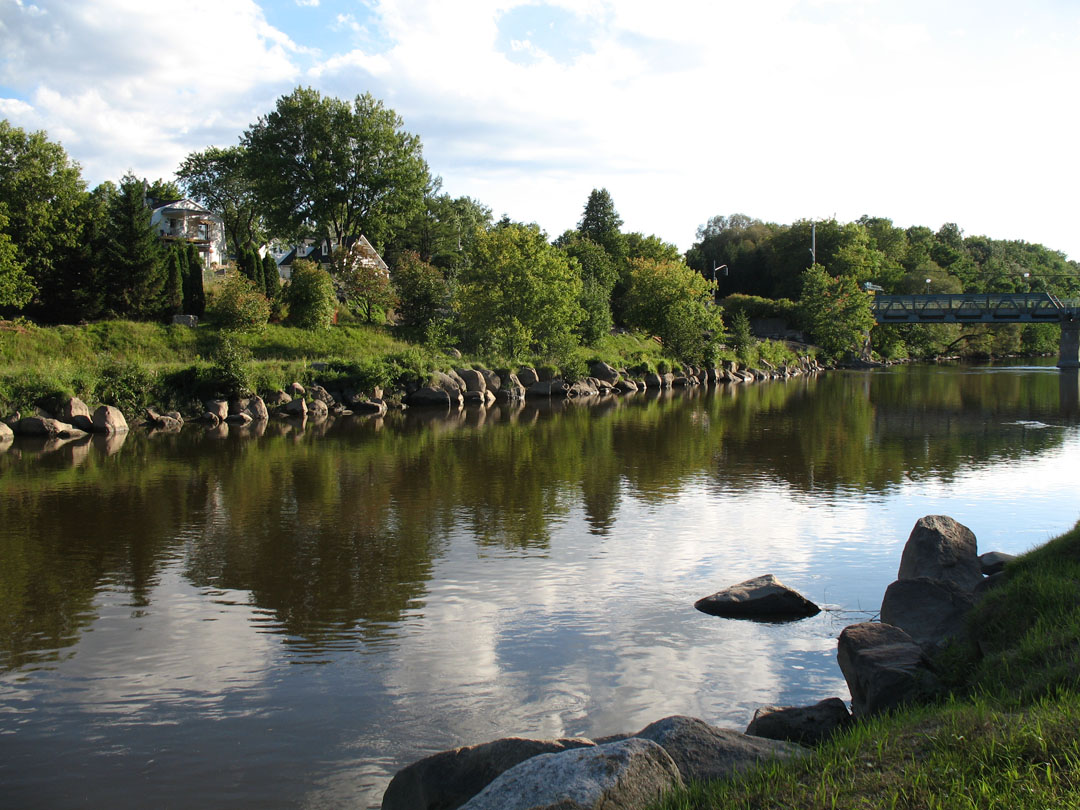
The Saint-Charles River in Saint-Sauveur near Scott Bridge.

In 1971, a campaign was launched to dismantle the railroad that ran through part of the neighbourhood and cut it off from the Parc Victoria. The tracks were finally removed in 1974.

From 2006 to 2008, Quebec City undertook the project to completely remake the Charest Boulevard in between the Langelier Boulevard and the Saint-Sacrament Avenue. The thoroughfare underwent a major 2.5-kilometer overhaul, with the widening of sidewalks and the planting of trees. Several residential construction projects were also started in the same area.

The Saint-Charles River, to the north of the neighbourhood, underwent renaturalization work on its banks in 2007. The Parc Victoria is also transformed by the construction of a water retention basin, along with the demolition of the Victoria Arena and the relocation of a chapel.

== List of mayors of Saint-Sauveur ==
- 1855–1858: Louis Falardeau
- 1858–?: Pierre Giroux
- ?–?: William Cook
- ?–?: François Falardeau
- 1870–1883: François Kirouac
- 1883–1884: Marcel Rochette
- 1884: Pierre Boutin
- 1885–1887: Michel Fiset
- 1887–1889: François Kirouac
- ?1901–1904: Émile Tourangeau

== Gallery ==
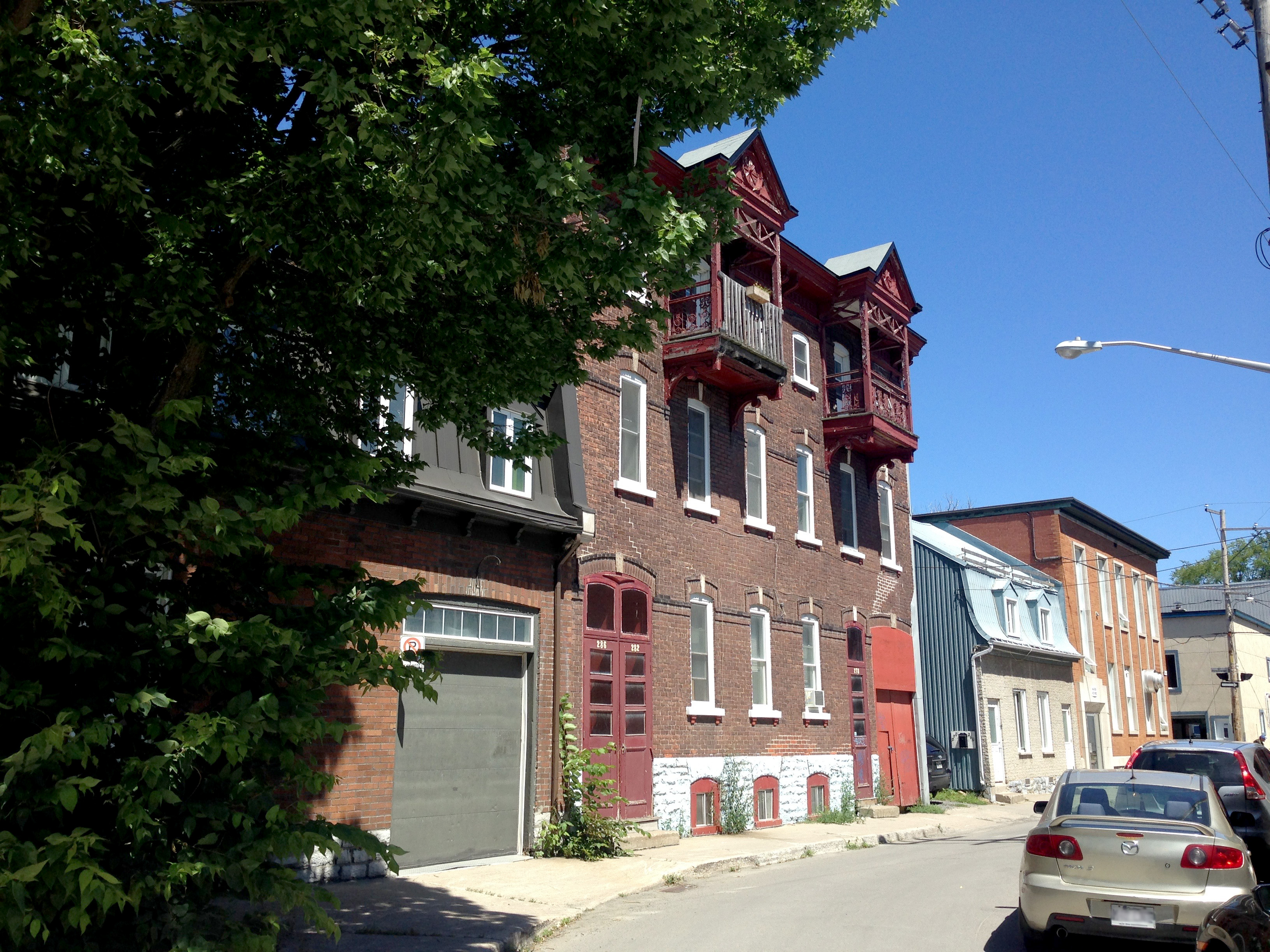
Chénier Street, near the Durocher Park.

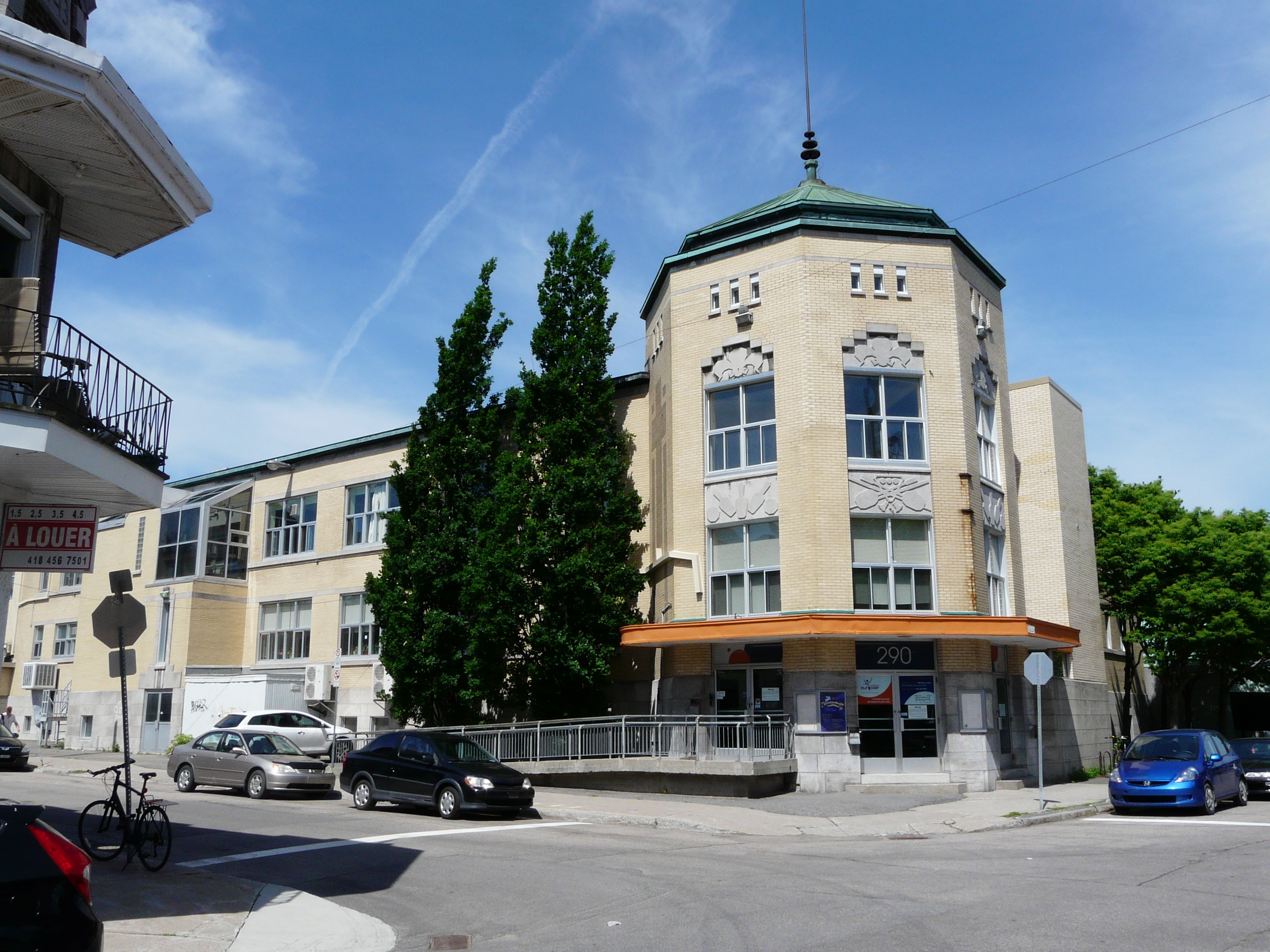
Now-demolished building formerly occupied by the Durocher Community Center from 1950 to 2014.

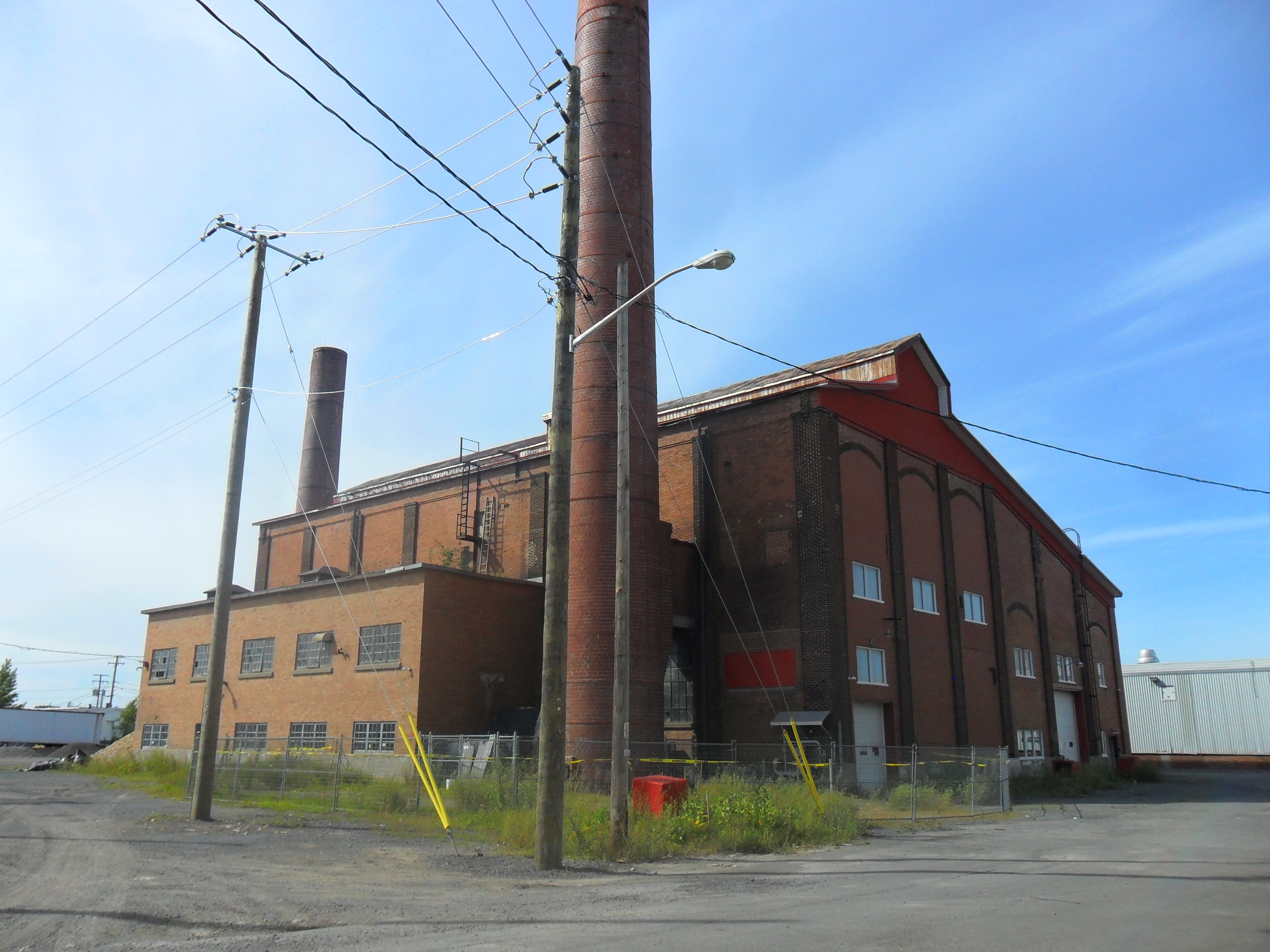
Saint-Malo Heating Plant, in the industrial park of the same name.

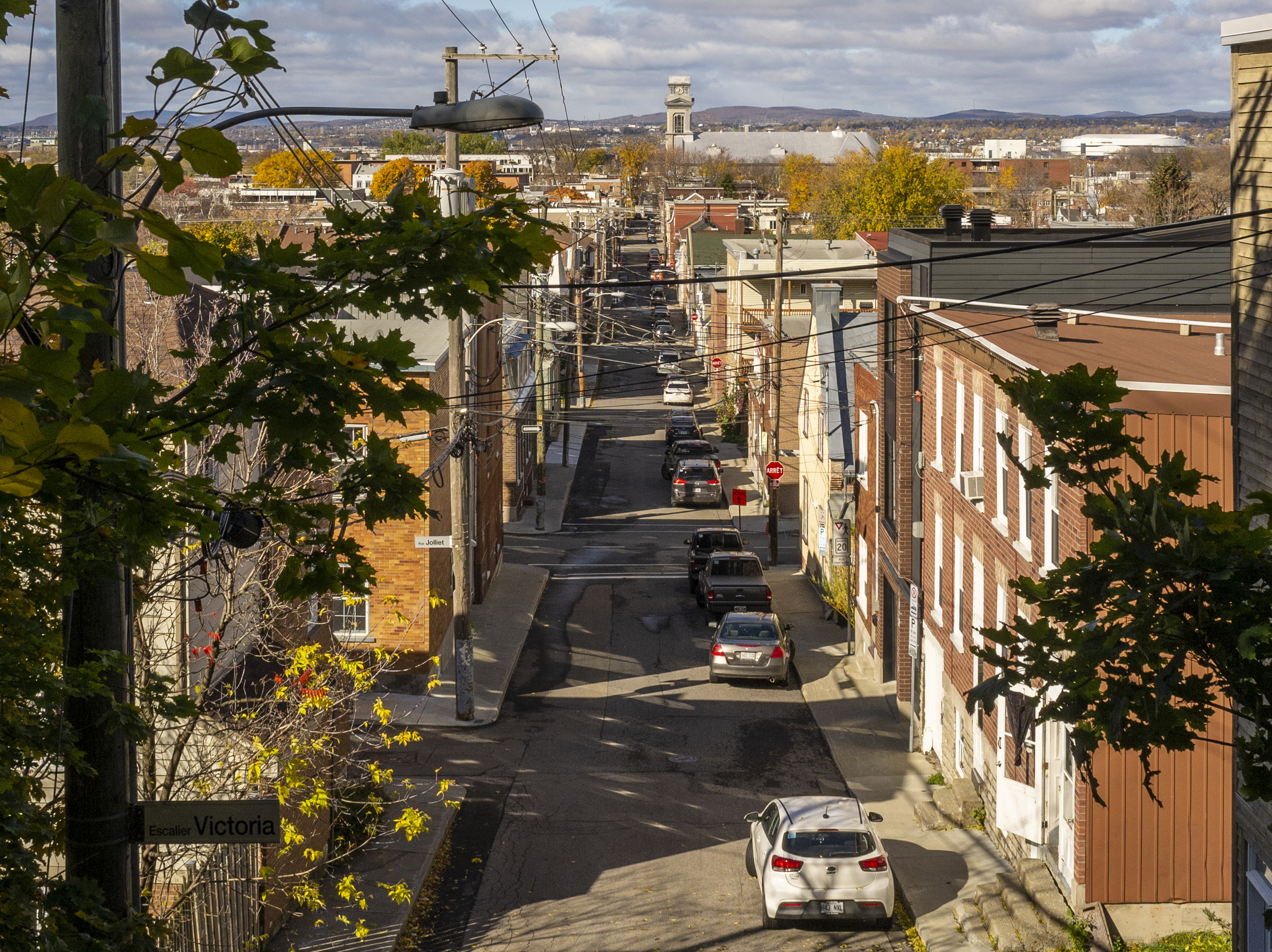
Perspective from the Victoria Staircase.
