= Lower Town of Quebec City =

The Lower Town of Quebec City is one of the two geographical and historical sectors of the borough of La Cité-Limoilou in Quebec. It is located at sea level as opposed to the Upper Town, which is located on the promontory of Quebec (whose highest point is 105 meters above sea level). This sector includes the Saint-Roch and Saint-Sauveur neighborhoods as well as some of the traditional neighborhood of Old Quebec.
