= Marie-Madeleine Maufils de Saint-Louis =

Religious Hospitaller and painter (1671– 1702)

- Born: Quebec
- Baptised: 21 December 1671
- Died: 1702
- Occupation: Painter, nun

Marie-Madeleine Maufils de Saint-Louis (baptised December 21, 1671 – buried December 5, 1702) was a Religious Hospitaller at the Hôtel-Dieu de Quebec and an early painter in New France.

Marie-Madeleine Maufils was born in Quebec, the daughter of Pierre Maufils and Madeleine Poulain. She joined the Religious Hospitallers in 1687. She was taught to painted and is documented as having painted and sketched a number of landscapes on paper, as well as painted landscapes on the panelling in the chapel of the Hôpital-Général de Québec. Her extant work is thought to have been destroyed in a fire in 1755.

She died tending to patients at the Hôtel-Dieu during the smallpox epidemic of 1702.
