= Louis-Joseph de Montcalm =

French Royal Army officer (1712–1759)

Lieutenant General Louis-Joseph de Montcalm-Gozon Marquis de Montcalm de Saint-Veran
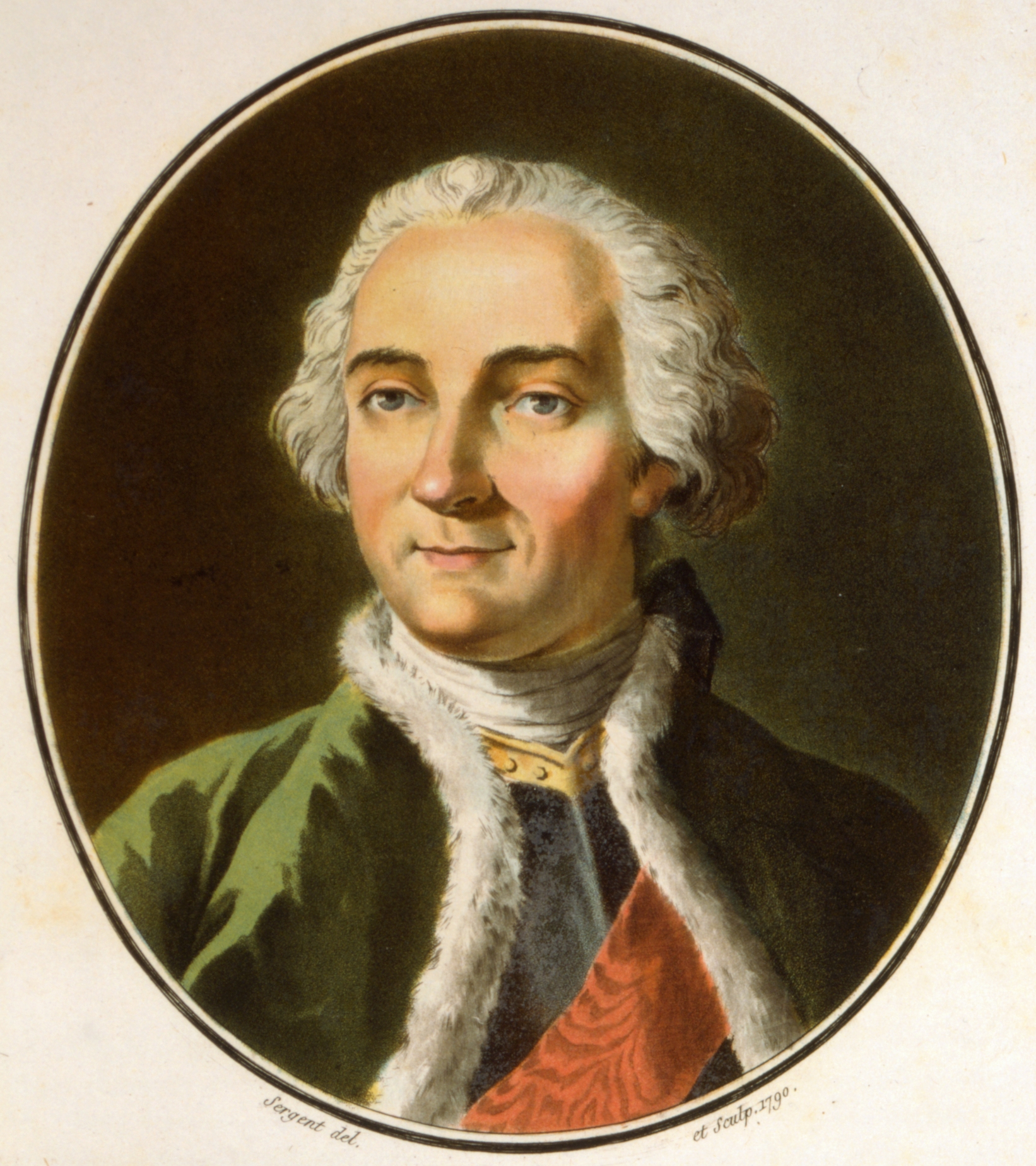
- Portrait by Sergent-Marceau
- Born: 28 February 1712; Chateau de Candiac, near Nîmes, Languedoc, France
- Died: 14 September 1759 (aged 47); Plains of Abraham, Quebec City, New France (now Quebec, Canada)
- Burial place: Cimetière de l'Hôpital-Général de Québec, Notre-Dame-des-Anges, Quebec
- Spouse: Angelique Louise Talon du Boulay
- Military career
- Allegiance: Kingdom of France
- Branch: Royal French Army
- Service years: 1721–1759
- Rank: Lieutenant General
- Commands: Regiment d'Auxerrois; Regiment de Montcalm; Commander-in-chief, New France
- Conflicts: War of the Polish Succession; Siege of Kehl; Siege of Philippsburg; War of the Austrian Succession; Siege of Prague; Battle of Piacenza; Battle of Assietta; Seven Years' War; Battle of Fort Oswego; Battle of Fort William Henry; Battle of Carillon; Battle of Beauport; Battle of the Plains of Abraham †
- Awards: Order of Saint Louis

Lieutenant-General Louis-Joseph de Montcalm-Gozon, Marquis de Montcalm de Saint-Veran (28 February 1712 – 14 September 1759) was a French Royal Army officer best known for his unsuccessful defence of New France during the French and Indian War.

Montcalm was born in Vestric-et-Candiac near Nîmes to an aristocratic family, and joined the French army at a young age. He served in the War of the Polish Succession and the War of the Austrian Succession, where his service resulted in a promotion to brigadier general. In 1756, King Louis XV sent him to New France to lead its defence against the British in the Seven Years' War. Montcalm met with notable successes in 1756, 1757 and 1758, but British mobilisation of large numbers of troops against New France led to military setbacks in 1758 and 1759 (when, in January, he was promoted to lieutenant general), culminating in Montcalm's death at the Battle of the Plains of Abraham.

Montcalm's service in New France was marked by conflict between himself and the Governor General of the colony, Pierre de Rigaud, marquis de Vaudreuil-Cavagnial. These men were the leaders of the war effort in New France during the Seven Years' War. Montcalm has been much memorialized, especially in France, Quebec and parts of New York and Lower Michigan. Military historians have praised and criticized his decisions in defending Quebec.

== Early life ==
Louis-Joseph was the son of Marie-Thérèse de Pierre and Louis-Daniel de Montcalm, of the House of Montcalm, a family of the Noblesse de Robe of Nîmes, at the family residence, the Chateau de Candiac, near Nîmes in southern France. He joined the French Royal Army in 1721, as an ensign in the Régiment d'Hainault. On the death of his father in 1735, he became the Marquis de Saint-Veran, inheriting the honours, rights, and debts of that position. His finances improved soon after by his marriage to Angelique Louise Talon du Boulay. Despite their marriage being initially arranged for money and influence, they were a devoted couple. They made their home at Candiac and had a large number of children of whom five survived to adulthood. (Note: The total number of children is usually said to be either ten or twelve; some sources indicate that six children survived.)

His father purchased a captaincy for him in 1729 and he served in the War of the Polish Succession, seeing action at the 1733 Siege of Kehl and the 1734 Siege of Philippsburg. When the War of the Austrian Succession broke out in 1740, his regiment was stationed in France, so Montcalm, seeking action, took a position as an aide-de-camp to Philippe Charles de La Fare. Montcalm and François Gaston de Lévis (who later served under him in New France) were both in the Siege of Prague. He was promoted to colonel of the Régiment d'Auxerrois in 1743. He took part in Marshal de Maillebois' Italian campaigns, where he was awarded the Order of Saint Louis in 1744 and taken prisoner in the 1746 Battle of Piacenza after receiving five sabre wounds while rallying his men. He was released on parole after several months' imprisonment, and promoted to Brigadier for his actions during the 1746 campaign. After prisoner exchanges made possible his return to active service, he joined the Italian campaign again in 1747. He was wounded again by a musket ball in the Battle of Assietta, and assisted in raising the Siege of Ventimiglia in October. When Marshal Belle-Isle retired that winter, his army was left under the command of its brigadiers, including Montcalm. The war came to an end in 1748 with the signing of the Treaty of Aix-la-Chapelle. In 1749 he was awarded a rare opportunity to raise a new regiment in peacetime; the Regiment de Montcalm was a cavalry regiment that Montcalm occasionally inspected.

== Defence of New France ==
When the Seven Years' War spread to New France, King Louis XV sent Brigadier General Montcalm to the colonies as Commander-in-Chief, with Colonel Chevalier de Levis now as his second-in-command and Capitaine Louis Antoine de Bougainville as his new aide-de-camp.

=== Battle of Fort Oswego ===
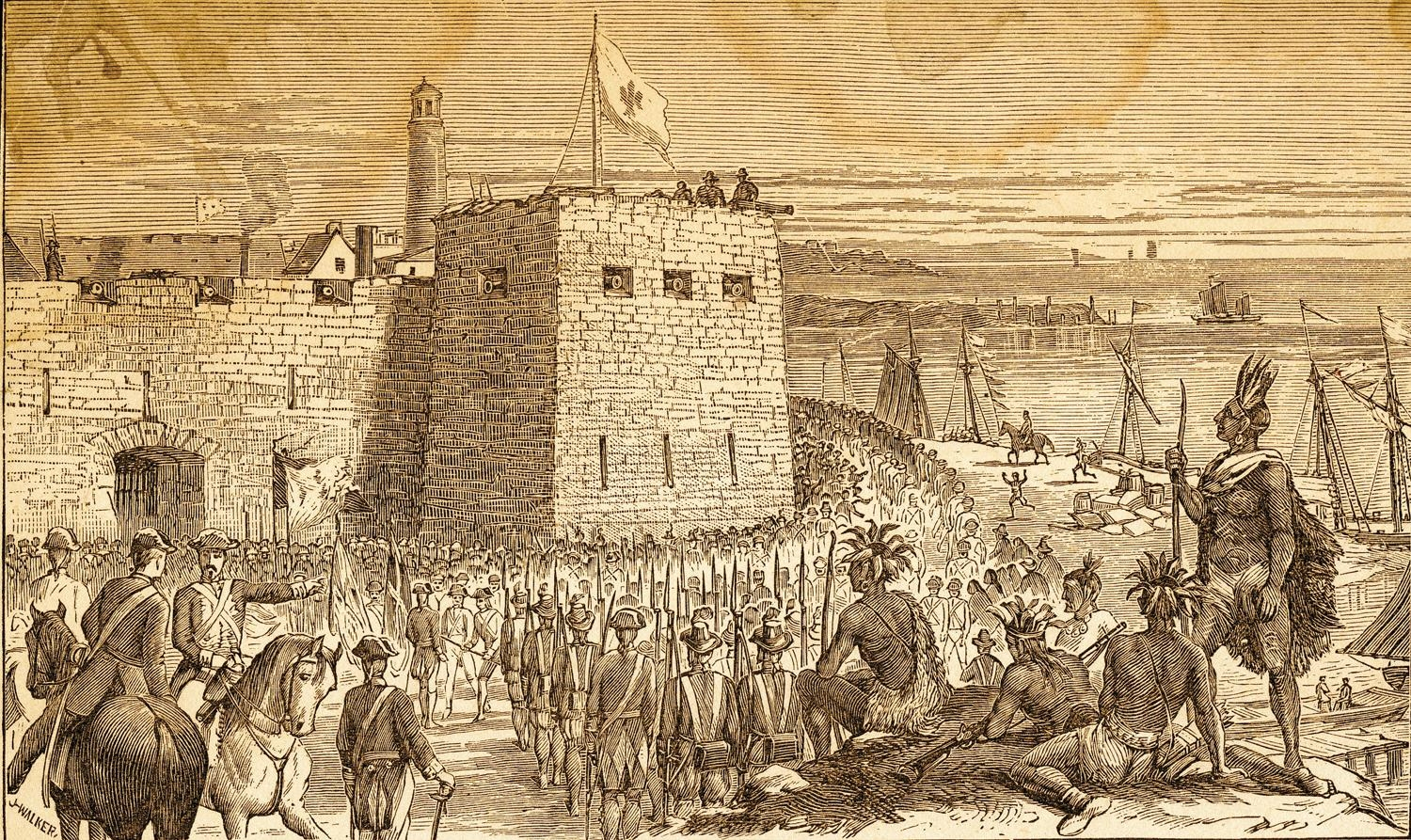
Battle of Fort Oswego

Upon Montcalm's arrival in Montreal, he was immediately apprised of the situation along the border with British North America. Concerned by the number of British troops amassing near the border, Montcalm left to visit Fort Carillon to inspect the defenses while the governor general, Pierre de Rigaud, Marquis de Vaudreuil-Cavagnial, began to prepare troops at Fort Frontenac for a potential assault on Oswego, a British fort across Lake Ontario. Montcalm's assemblage of troops at Fort Carillon distracted the attention of the British, and upon receiving positive reports from scouts, Vaudreuil and Montcalm decided to make an approach and try to take the fort. When Montcalm returned to Fort Frontenac, he found a force of 3,500 men assembled, being regular French troops, Canadian militia, and Native Americans. On August 9, the forces crossed the lake and rapidly besieged the British fort. By the morning of August 13, the French had set up nine cannons and began to fire towards the fort while reinforcements surrounded the opposite side. The British commander was killed during the offensive, and the fort was quickly surrendered soon thereafter. 1,700 prisoners were taken, including 80 officers, as well as money, military correspondence, food provisions, guns, and boats, and the fort burnt and razed to the ground. Upwards of 100 prisoners were massacred in the wake of the surrender by Montcalm's Indian allies. Montcalm's first victory in North America came relatively quickly and easily, and signified to the British that the French now had a capable general heading their army. Despite the victory, Montcalm held reservations concerning the offensive strategy employed by Vaudreuil, and questioned the military value of the Canadian militias. This marked the beginning of the increasingly antagonistic relationship between Vaudreuil and Montcalm, which would prove to be crucial later on.

=== Battle of Fort William Henry ===
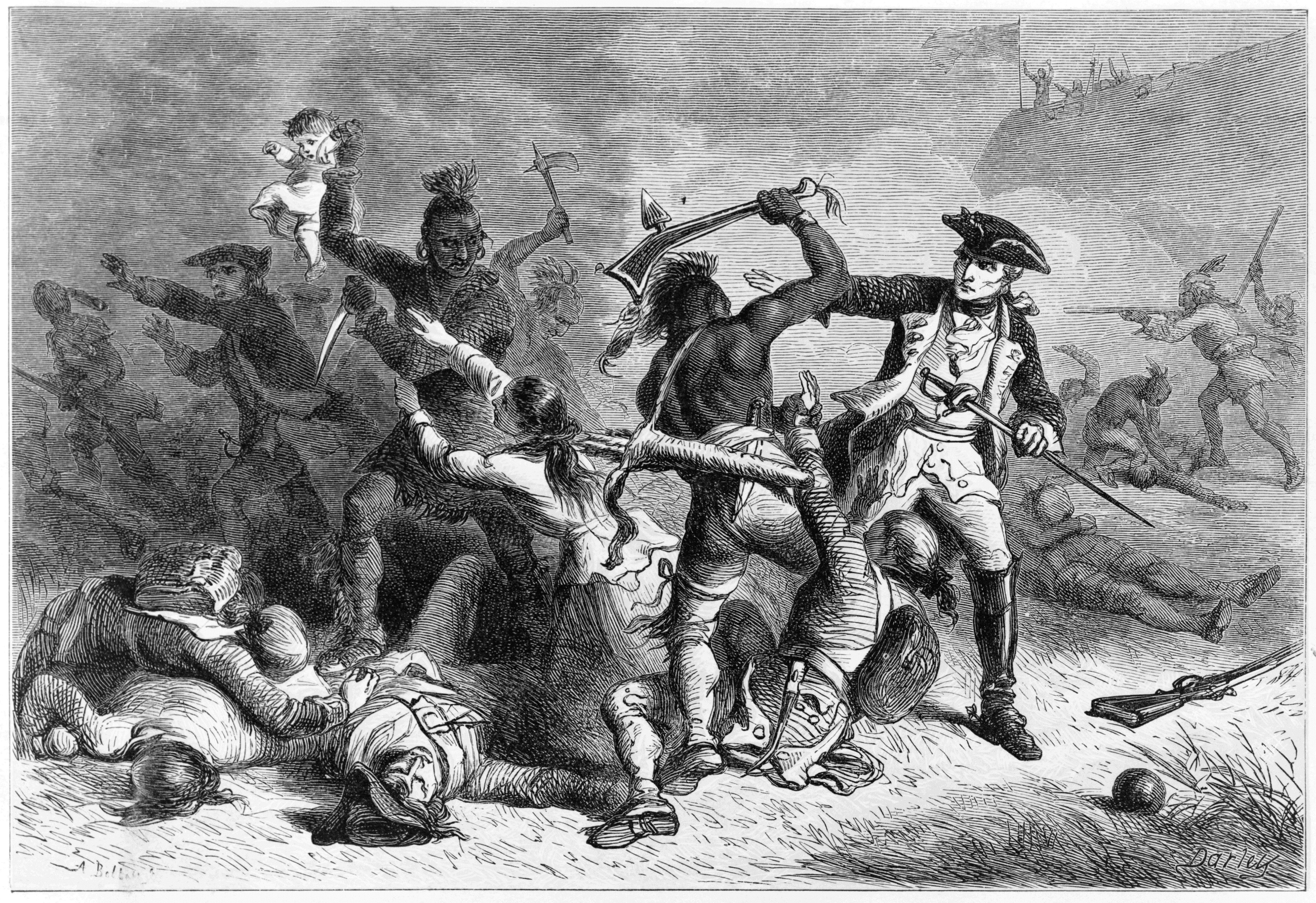
Montcalm trying to stop Native Americans from attacking British soldiers and civilians as they leave Fort William Henry

The following year, Montcalm achieved his greatest military success to date with the taking of Fort William Henry. Vaudreuil drew up plans for Montcalm that ordered him to march south and take the British bases south of Lake Champlain, Fort William Henry and Fort Edward a few miles further south. From Fort Carillon, Montcalm and a force of 6,200 regulars and militia, along with 1,800 natives set upon Fort William Henry on 3 August 1757. The fort was besieged for three days before surrender. Under the terms of the surrender, the garrison was to be escorted by French troops back to Fort Edward, where they would be barred from serving against the French for 18 months, and all British prisoners were to be returned to the French, who also kept all the stores and ammunition. As the garrison left Fort William Henry, however, they were attacked by Montcalm's native allies, and around 200 of the 2,000 prisoners were killed, breaching the terms of surrender. Montcalm decided not to advance on to Fort Edward despite the demoralization of the British forces and the proximity of the fort, claiming the road was too bad for his heavy guns and that the garrison would be reinforced before they arrived. This decision infuriated Vaudreuil, furthering the deterioration of their relationship.

=== Battle of Carillon ===
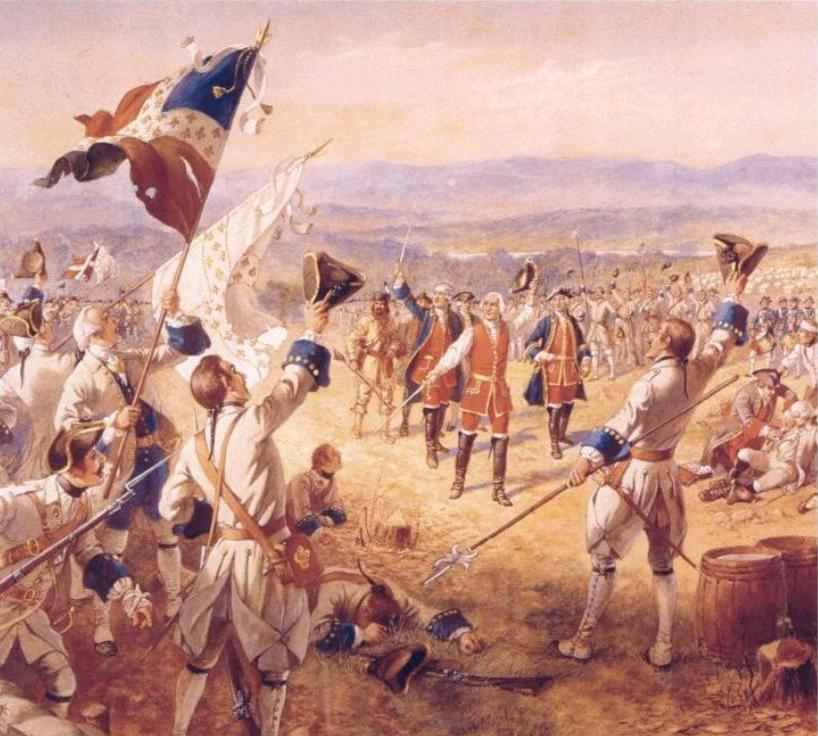
The Victory of Montcalm's Troops at Carillon by Henry Alexander Ogden

In July 1758, Vaudreuil sent Montcalm to block a British push near Fort Carillon, on Lake Champlain. The British force gathering under Major-General James Abercrombie was much larger than expected, with 6,000 British regulars and 9,000 provincial militiamen. On July 5, the British began to set upon the fort, but the killing of the British second-in-command held them up long enough for Canadian reinforcements to arrive and bring Montcalm's total force to over 3,600. Despite the relative insecurity of this particular fort and the overwhelming number of enemy troops, the French were able to hold the garrison due to a series of costly errors by the British general Abercrombie. By not waiting to bring up his heavy guns to blast the weak wooden defenses and failing to capitalize on a major flaw in the French lines, which would have allowed the British troops to easily outflank the garrison, Abercrombie enabled the French to sustain steady musket fire and hold off the attack. The battle was a major success for the French and a major setback for the British, and greatly added to the reputation of Montcalm, who boasted of his victory and often exaggerated his claims in writings back to France while disparaging the efforts of the Canadian and native fighters. Montcalm also accused Vaudreuil of purposely sending his troops, and Montcalm specifically, into a slaughter based on the size of the respective forces, a claim quickly refuted by Vaudreuil, who subsequently requested that Montcalm be recalled to France and that the Chevalier de Lévis be appointed to succeed him.

=== Quebec ===
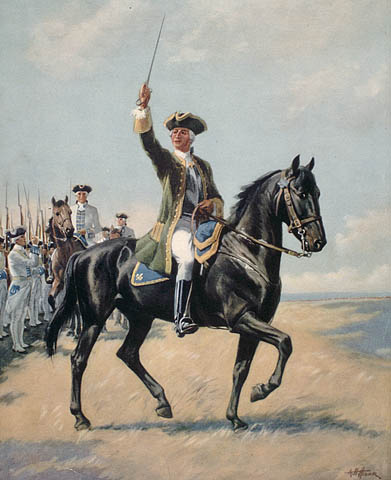
Montcalm leading his troops at Quebec

In the second half of 1758, the British began to take the upper hand in North America, due in part to the massive resources they organized against the French and in part to the lack of reinforcements and supplies from France to support its colony, which was already on the brink of starvation following a catastrophic harvest. Louis XV therefore ordered the colony to reduce its defensive perimeter to the valley of the Saint Lawrence River, evacuating all forts in Ohio along with those around Lake Ontario and Lake Champlain. The French Minister of War nonetheless expressed his full support to Montcalm, confident that despite the odds, he would find a way to frustrate the enemy's plans, as he had done at Fort Carillon. This news, along with the threat of impending attack by the British, crushed Montcalm's spirit, who had lost all hope of holding the city in case of a siege.

Wolfe's forces reached Quebec in late June, 1759, and taking position on the opposite shore, started bombarding the city on July 12, reducing the city to rubble over the course of two months. Montcalm, on many occasions, managed to repel attempted landings by the British forces, most notably at the Battle of Beauport, on 31 July 1759. After spending the month of August ravaging the countryside, the British would once again attempt a landing on September 13, this time at l'Anse au Foulons, catching the French off guard. Before Montcalm could react, Wolfe's forces had already reached the plains outside the city, and were ready for battle.

In a decision largely considered to be Montcalm's greatest mistake, the general decided to attack the British with what forces he had rather than wait for the forces garrisoned along the shore to come and bolster his numbers. The marquis believed that if he allowed the British to fortify their position, he would not be able to defeat them, and the attack therefore could not wait. In the ensuing Battle of the Plains of Abraham, the French forces were defeated.

== Death and burial ==
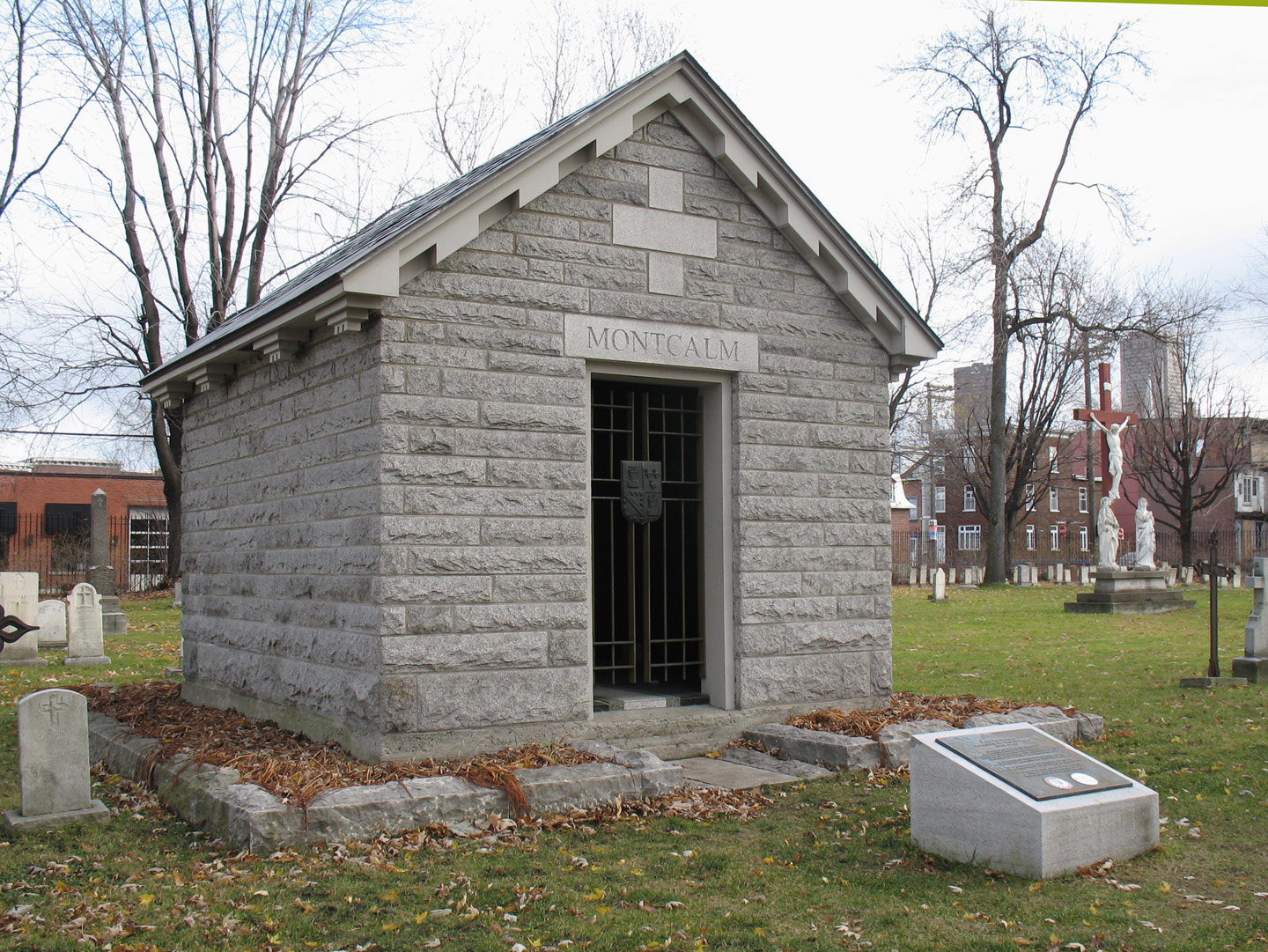
Montcalm's mausoleum in the cemetery of the Hôpital-Général de Québec

While riding back towards the city, General Montcalm was hit in the back by a musket shot. Assisted by three soldiers, he regained the city, where he was taken before a surgeon, who announced Montcalm would not live through the night. During the afternoon, the general drew on his last reserves of strength and signed his last official act as commander of the French army in Canada. In a letter addressed to General Wolfe, who unbeknownst to him had also fallen in battle, Montcalm attempted to surrender the city, despite the fact he did not hold the authority to do so. He died at around 5:00 am on 14 September 1759. At 8:00 am, he was buried in a shell hole under the choir of the Ursuline church. His death marked the end of French rule in Canada. On October 11, 2001, the remains of Montcalm were removed from the Ursuline convent and placed into a newly built mausoleum in the cemetery of the Hôpital-Général de Québec.

== Conflict between Montcalm and Vaudreuil ==
Montcalm's service in New France was marked by conflict with the Governor General of the colony, Pierre de Rigaud, Marquis de Vaudreuil-Cavagnial. The sources of the conflict were twofold.

=== Personal conflict ===
Firstly, Montcalm and Vaudreuil represented distinct martial services. Montcalm was a soldier in the army (troupes de terres), while Vaudreuil was a marine in the navy (compagnies franches de la marine). That meant that the former reported to the Ministry of War, but the latter reported to the Naval Ministry. According to the historian Christian Crouch, "Separate ministries meant separate career networks, separate routes to power, and separate patrons.... Jealously protective of their spheres of influence, the leaders of the war effort…were soon at odds." That led Montcalm to keep writing to the Minister of War, Comte d'Argenson, to complain about Vaudreuil's relative inexperience as a military strategist, among other things, in the hope of replacing him as chief strategist. Similarly, Vaudreuil would consistently write to the minister of the navy to complain about Montcalm's insubordination in the hope of having him replaced; Montcalm having been made subordinate to the former by the royal council in the hope of avoiding any disagreements over strategy, despite otherwise holding equivalent ranks. Thus, the first source of conflict between Montcalm and Vaudreuil was very much personal.

=== Societal conflict personified ===
However, the historian Guy Frégault, on the conflict between Montcalm and Vaudreuil, has said, "The conflict has been the subject of much debate. But the division that split the high command was more than a personal quarrel. It involved societies – and what it is that causes societies to arm themselves to endure." Thus, the second source of conflict between Montcalm and Vaudreuil was that they represented distinct societies and martial cultures. Montcalm represented the culture of the French metropolitan officer, and Vaudreuil represented that of the Canadian colonial officer. The culture of the French metropolitan officer led Montcalm and others like him to see the Seven Years' War in terms of a defence of their own and their kingdom's honour, regardless of what it meant for New France. Conversely, the culture of the Canadian colonial officer led Vaudreuil and others like him to interpret the war in terms of a defence of the territorial integrity of New France and thus its very existence.

The differences in interpretation led to differences in opinion about how the war should be waged. Montcalm was of the opinion that "colonial methods had had their day, and now war was established 'on a European footing, with planned campaigns, armies, artillery, sieges, battles....'" Waging the war that way would ensure the preservation and extension of French military honour, which was of particular importance to the king and his government after the loss of Fort Beauséjour at the outset of the war. Conversely, Vaudreuil was of the opinion that the war should be waged as based on established "colonial methods," which meant extending fortifications, consistently repelling British incursions, "defending the soil of our frontiers foot by foot against the enemy," fighting defensively, raiding extensively, and (most importantly) securing and relying heavily on Native participation. Montcalm was particularly disparaging of the last method since he thought that it would diminish French honour. Some French metropolitan officers saw Native military methods as boundlessly cruel and scalping as particularly revolting. After his victory at Carillon, he even went as far as saying to a delegation of Native leaders, "You have come at a time when I have no more need of you. Have you only come to see dead bodies? Go behind the fort and you will find them. I do not need you to defeat the English."

The conflict between Montcalm and Vaudreuil would be largely solved or at least rendered irrelevant when, in 1758, the former was promoted to the rank of lieutenant general, thus outranking the latter, and acquiring a virtually free hand in the determination of military strategy.

== Honours ==
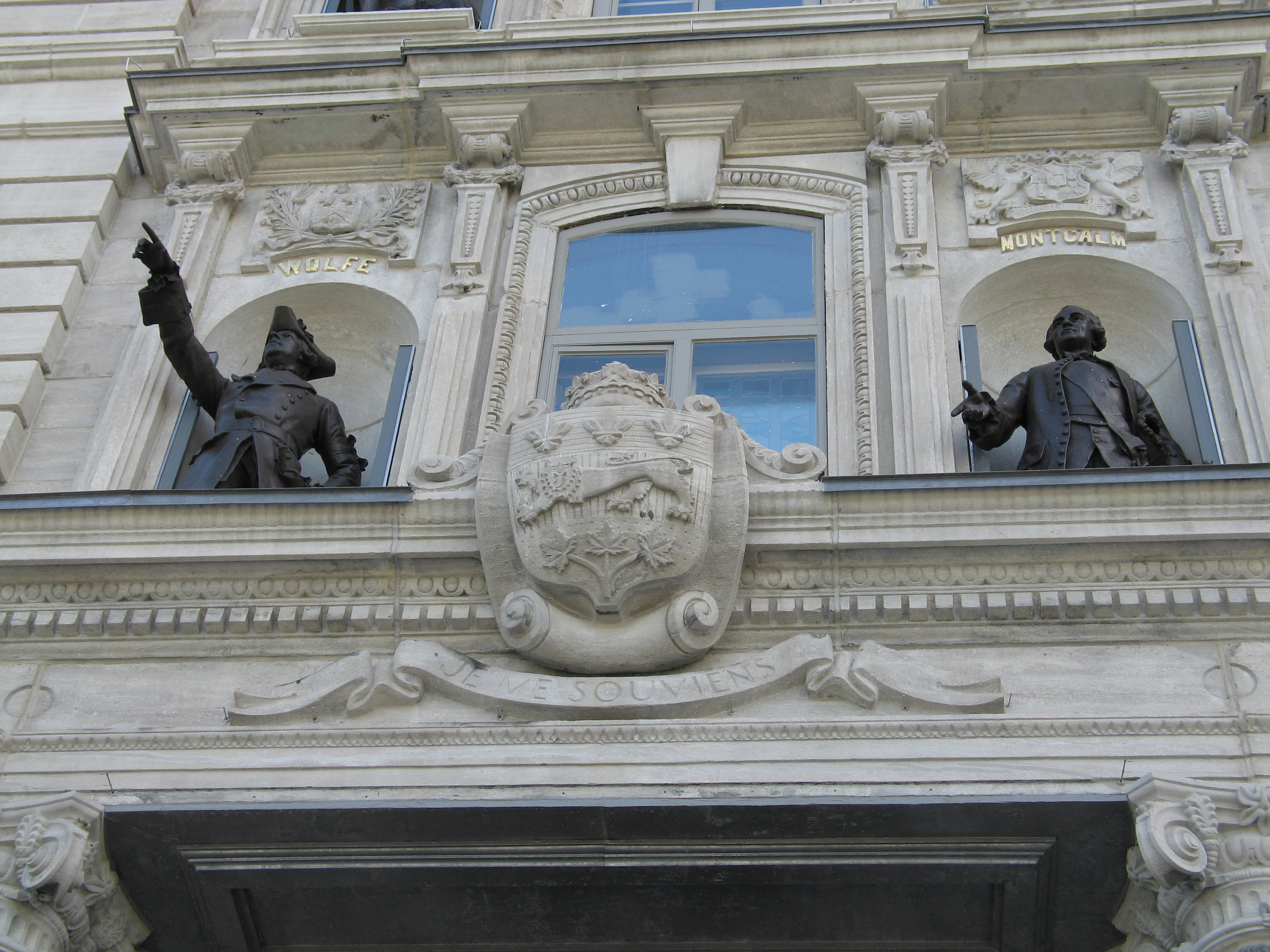
Sculptures of James Wolfe and Marquis de Montcalm in front of Parliament Building (Quebec)

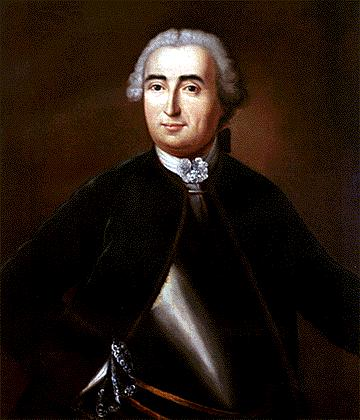
Louis-Joseph de Montcalm (1712–1759) by Théophile Hamel

Four vessels of the French Navy have been named in his honour:

- An Alma-class ironclad (1865–1891)
- An armoured cruiser (1898–1926)
- A La Galissonnière-class cruiser (1933–1969, served in the Free French Naval Forces)
- An F70 type frigate (1975–2017)
- The Montcalm Squadron of cadets at the Royal Military College of Canada was named in his honour

Many sites and landmarks were named to honour Montcalm. They include:

- Palais Montcalm, Quebec City, Quebec
- Rue Montcalm, Montreal, Quebec
- Montcalm Avenue, Plattsburgh, New York
- Montcalm, New Hampshire
- Montcalm Secondary School, London, Ontario
- Rue Montcalm, Paris, 18th arrondissement of Paris, Caen, Clermont-Ferrand, La Rochelle, France
- Rue Montcalm (Montcalm Street), Hull, Quebec
- Montcalm Crescent, Calgary, Alberta
- Montcalm Street, Detroit, Michigan
- Montcalm Avenue, St. Catharines, Ontario
- Montcalm Street, Vancouver, British Columbia
- Montcalm Street, Ottawa, Ontario
- Montcalm Street, Ticonderoga, New York, named in 1933
- Montcalm Avenue, Buffalo, New York
- Montcalm Park, on the site of the former Fort George, Oswego, New York
- Montcalm Avenue (originally "Avenue du Montcalm"), in the historically French city of Plattsburgh, New York, 18 miles south of the Canada-US border
- Montcalm High School, Montcalm, West Virginia, although the area is not historically connected to France or the French and Indian War
- Montcalm Avenue, Brighton, Massachusetts
- Lake Montcalm, Montcalm County, Michigan
- Montcalm County in western Michigan. General Wolfe bears no place names in Michigan, while Montcalm names a county and a lake.
- Montcalm Close, Orewa, Auckland, New Zealand
- Montcalm Avenue, Baie-Comeau, Quebec
- Montcalm Road, Warfield, British Columbia
- Montcalm Street, Lake George (village), New York
- Montcalm Road, Charlton, London, England
- Rue Montcalm, Montpellier, France
- Montcalm Secondary School, in the Thames Valley District School Board in London, Ontario, Canada

== In popular culture ==
In James Fenimore Cooper's 1826 novel The Last of the Mohicans, Montcalm appears as an antagonist and ally of the Huron warrior Magua. In the 1936 film adaptation, he is played by William Stack, and by Patrice Chéreau in the 1992 adaptation.

== See also ==
- Military of New France
- French colonization of the Americas

== Notes ==
=== Bibliography ===
- Anderson, Fred (2005). The War that Made America. New York: Viking. ISBN 0-670-03454-1.
- Casgrain, Henri-Raymond (1891). Montcalm et Levis. Québec: Imprimerie de L.-J. Demers & Frère.
- Casgrain, Henri-Raymond, ed. (1895). Louis-Joseph de Montcalm, Journal du Marquis de Montcalm: Durant ses Campagnes en Canada de 1756-1759. Québec: L.-J. Demers & Frère.
- Casgrain, Henri-Raymond (1905). Wolfe and Montcalm. Morang. ISBN 9780722269794. OCLC 192112046.
- Casgrain, Henri-Raymond (1964) [1884]. Wolfe and Montcalm. Toronto: University of Toronto.
- Chartrand, René (2000). Ticonderoga 1758: Montcalm's Victory Against All Odds. Oxford: Osprey Publishing. ISBN 1-84176-093-5.
- Crouch, Christian A. (2014). Nobility Lost: French and Canadian Martial Cultures, Indians, and the End of New France. Ithaca: Cornell University Press.
- Eccles, W. J. (1974). Montcalm, Louis-Joseph de, Marquis de Montcalm. Vol. 3. Toronto: University of Toronto.
- Frégault, Guy (1955). La Guerre de la Conquête. Montréal: Fides.
- Frégault, Guy (1969). Canada: the war of the conquest. Toronto: Oxford University Press.
- MacLeod, D. Peter (2008). Northern Armageddon: the Battle of the Plains of Abraham. Vancouver: Douglas & MacIntyre.
- Nester, William R. (2000). The First Global War: Britain, France, and the Fate of North America, 1756–1775. Westport, CT: Praeger.
- Sommervogel, Carlos (1872). Comme on servait autrefois: le marquis de Montcalm, le maréchal de Bellefonds (in French). J. Albanel. OCLC 25446420.
