= Faubourg =

Ancient French word for part of a city

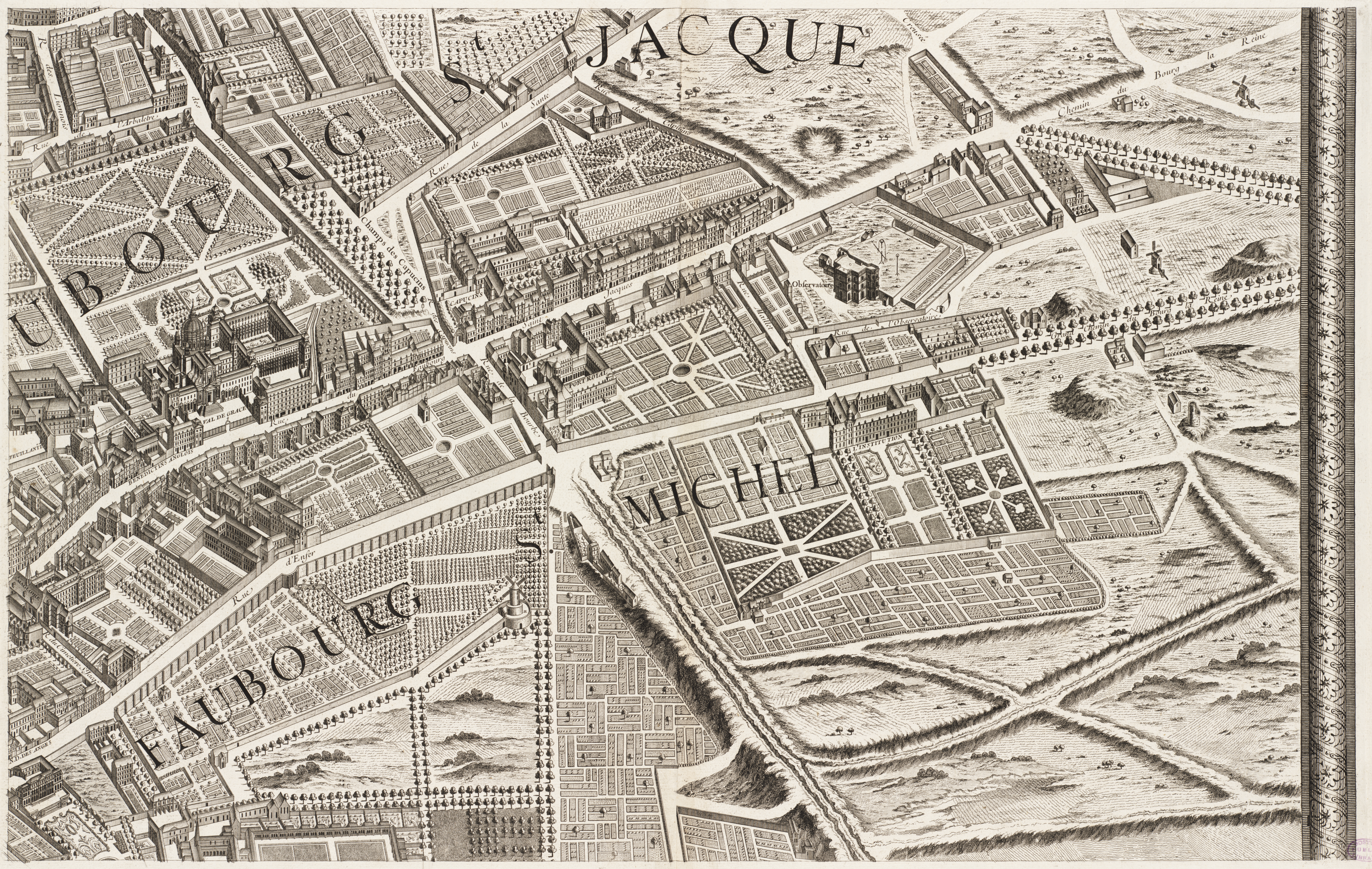
Turgot map of Paris (1734–1736), showing part of the Faubourg Saint-Michel and Faubourg Saint-Jacques

"Faubourg" (French: [fo.buːʁ]) is an ancient French term historically equivalent to "fore-town" (now often termed suburb or banlieue). The earliest form is forsbourg, derived from Latin forīs, 'out of', and Vulgar Latin (originally Germanic) burgum, 'town' or 'fortress'. Traditionally, this name was given to an agglomeration forming around a throughway leading outwards from a city gate, and usually took the name of the same thoroughfare within the city. As cities were often located atop hills (for defensive purposes), their outlying communities were frequently lower down. Many faubourgs were located outside the city walls, and "suburbs" were further away from this location (sub, "below"; urbs urbis, "city").

Faubourgs are sometimes considered the predecessor of European suburbs, into which they sometimes evolved in the 1950s and 1960s, while others underwent further urbanisation. Although early suburbs still preserved some characteristics related to faubourgs (the back alleys with doors, little break margins for houses, etc.), later suburbs underwent major changes in city planning, primarily in residential density.

Besides many French cities, faubourgs can still be found outside Europe in such places as the Canadian province of Quebec and the American city of New Orleans. The cities of Quebec and Montreal contain examples, but Montreal, with its far greater divergences in banlieues, has more similarity to Ontarian and American suburbs.

== Paris ==
Faubourgs were prominent around Paris from the 16th century. At that time, Paris was surrounded by a city wall. But even outside the Louis XIII wall there were urbanised areas, and those were called faubourgs. In 1701, these faubourgs were annexed to the city, and at about the same time, the wall was demolished; where it once stood, there is now the chain of Great Boulevards that leads from Place de la Bastille via Place de la République and Place de la Madeleine to Place de la Concorde. The border of the city was transferred a few kilometers outwards, and the new borderline, which was in force until 1860, is now marked by the outer circle of boulevards passing through Place Charles de Gaulle in the west and Place de la Nation in the east.

In 1860, the border of the city was once more transferred a few kilometers outwards to where it still is. Haussmann's renovation of Paris erased many traces of ancient faubourgs and the term banlieue was then coined.

Many Parisian streets have retained their ancient denomination in spite of city growth; today it is still possible to discern pre-1701 delimitations in Paris by marking the point where a thoroughfare's name changes from rue to rue du faubourg. For instance, the rue du Faubourg Saint-Denis used to be located outside of the city wall and was an extension of the rue Saint-Denis within the walls. The rue du Faubourg Saint-Honoré came about in a similar manner.

== New Orleans ==
The term was also used in the early expansion of New Orleans beyond the original city plan, when French was still a common language in the colonial city. Faubourg Tremé and Faubourg Marigny, two of the oldest neighborhoods outside of the French Quarter, are persistent examples. Another examples are Faubourg Ste. Marie, originally (late 18th century) a residential area, which was overtaken by commerce, developing into the modern Central Business District, as well as Duplantier, Saulet, La Course, Annunciation, Nuns, Lafayette, Livaudais, Delassize, Plaisance, Delachaise, Bouligny, Avart, Daunois, Montegut, Montreuil, Duralde, Macarty, Caraby, Lesseps, Andry, and Ursulines

== Montreal ==
Greater Montreal no longer has any actual faubourgs on the main island, as the suburb now refers to the North and South Shores. However, place names such as le Faubourg St-Laurent are still occasionally used to refer to the sections of Ville-Marie.

Furthermore, the term des faubourgs de Montréal ("the Montreal suburbs") is preserved in some place names in the city proper, such as the annexes (branches) of the École des Métiers des Faubourgs-de-Montréal. There was also a Caisse des Faubourgs de Montréal in The Village, which in 2003 was closed down.

== Québec City ==
The term faubourg is still alive in Quebec City, where it is mostly used to designate the Saint-Jean-Baptiste neighbourhood, often called Faubourg Saint-Jean-Baptiste or even le faubourg by its inhabitants. The term also applies to the Saint-Roch and Saint-Sauveur areas, and the three neighbourhoods were, between the 2001 and 2013 municipal elections, comprised in the municipal district of les Faubourgs. The term also refers to the particular urbanistic features of these pre-industrial neighborhoods (like very narrow streets), compared to the other central, but much more recent, neighborhoods of Limoilou and Montcalm, that were mainly developed as 20th century streetcar suburbs.

== See also ==
- Vorstadt, the German equivalent
