= Louise Soumande =

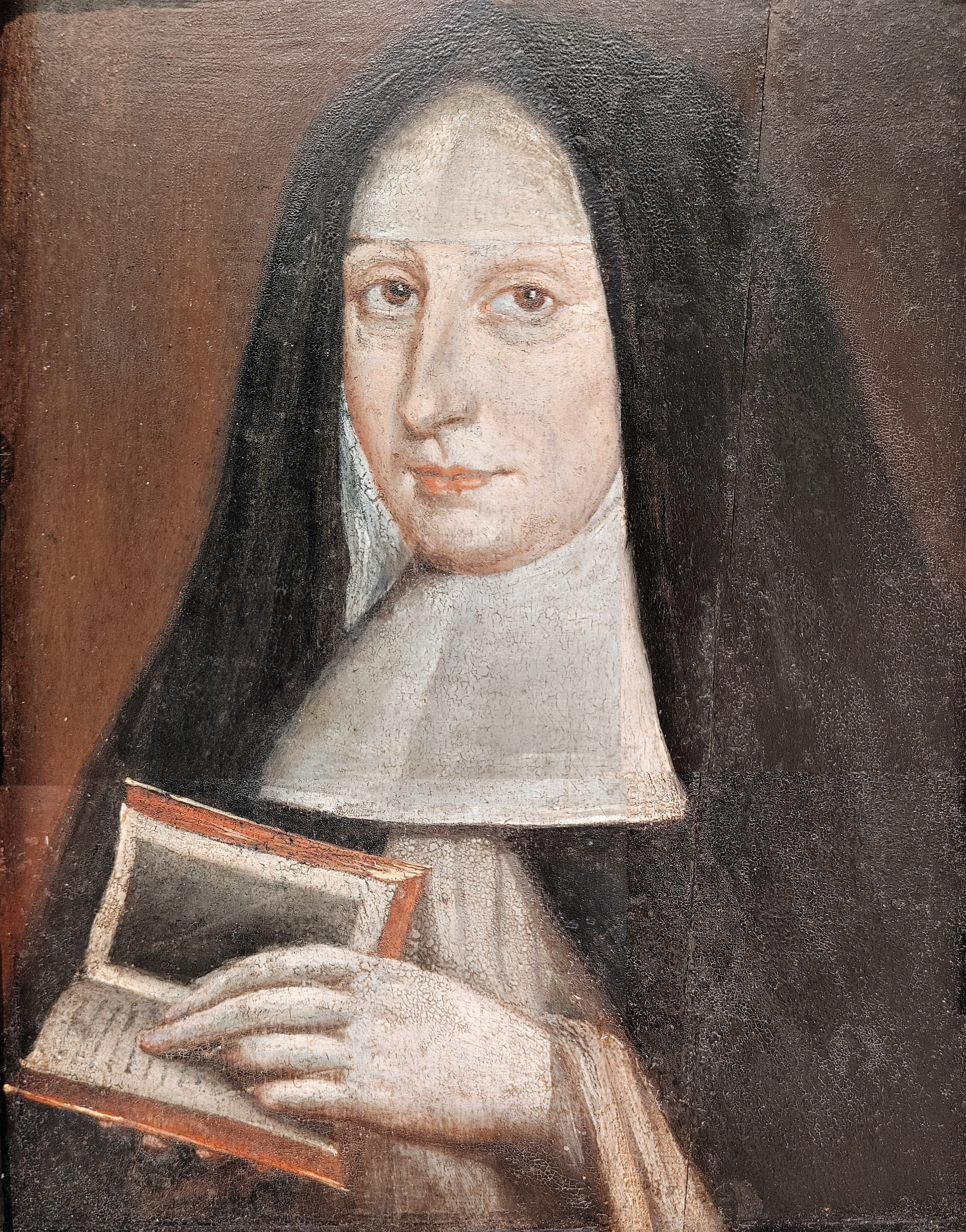
- portrait by Michel Dessaillant de Richeterre
- Born: May 16, 1664; Quebec City
- Died: November 28, 1708 (aged 44); Quebec City
- Occupation: Religious
- Position held: superior (1694–1699), superior (1702–1708)

Louise Soumande de Saint-Augustin (May 16, 1664 – November 28, 1708) was a nun in New France. She was the first mother superior of the Hôpital Général de Quebec.

Louise Soumande was born on May 16, 1664, in Quebec City, the daughter of Pierre Soumande, a master taillandier (maker of edged tools), and Simone Côté. In 1678, she entered the Hôtel-Dieu de Quebec as a noviciate. She went on to serve as Hospitaller, depositary for the poor, and assistant superior.

She and three other nuns from the Hôtel-Dieu were sent to run the Hôpital Général de Quebec. Soumande was elected as the first superior in 1664 and held the post until 1699. She served again as superior from 1702 until May 1708.

Louise Soumande died on 28 November 1708 in Quebec City. Her portrait was painted the day after her death by Michel Dessaillant de Richeterre.
