= Notre-Dame-des-Anges, Quebec =

Notre-Dame-des-Anges
- Parish municipality
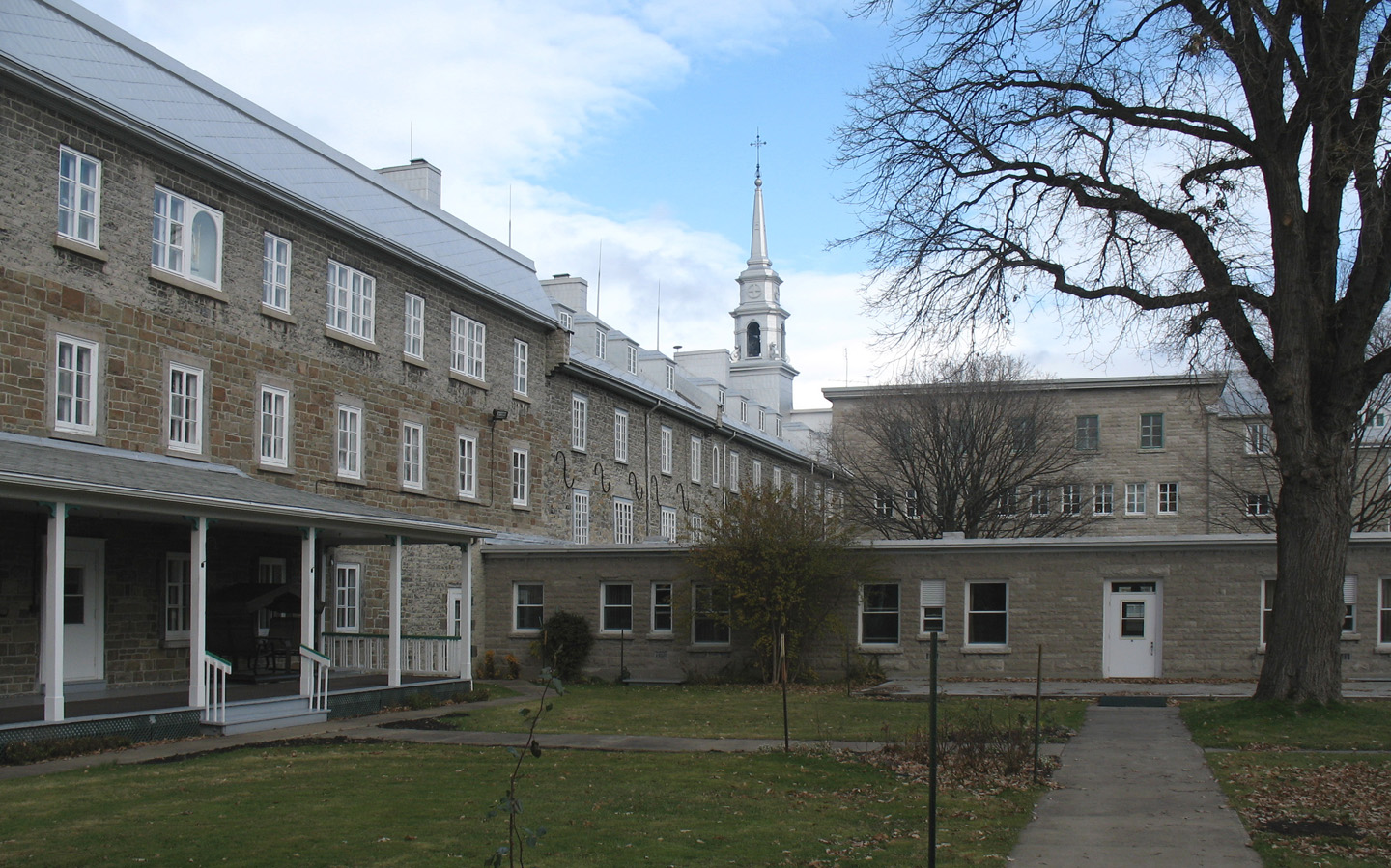

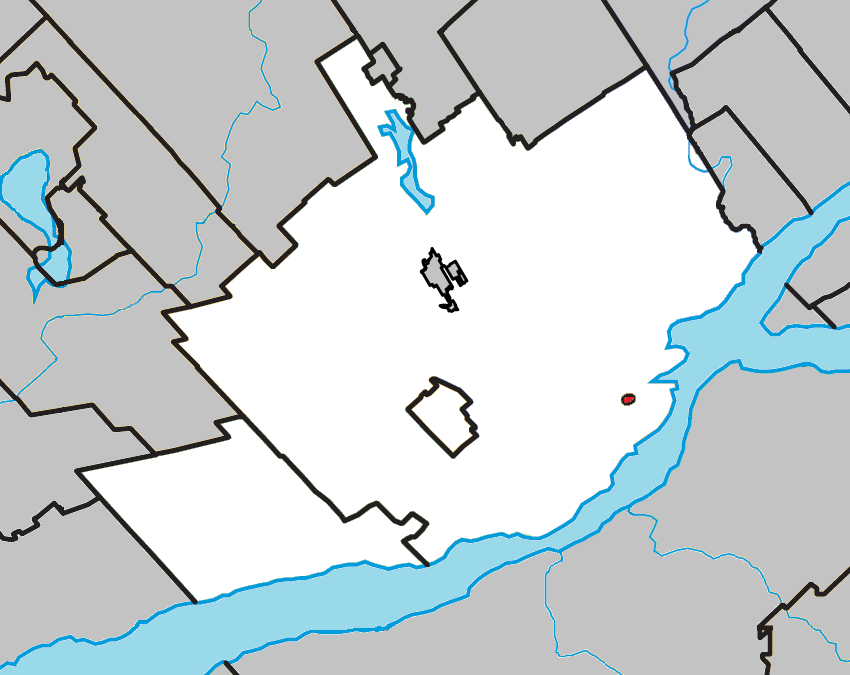
- Location within Quebec TE.

- Location in central Quebec
- Coordinates: 46°49′N 71°14′W
- Country: Canada
- Province: Quebec
- Region: Capitale-Nationale
- RCM: None
- Settled: 1620
- Constituted: July 1, 1855
- Named for: Friary of Our Lady of the Angels

Government
  - Administrator: Soeur Aline Plante
  - Federal riding: Québec Centre
  - Prov. riding: Taschereau

Area
  - Total: 0.04 km^{2} (0.015 sq mi)
  - Land: 0.04 km^{2} (0.015 sq mi)

Population (2021)
  - Total: 241
  - Density: 6,478.5/km^{2} (16,779/sq mi)
  - Pop 2006-2011: ▼24.2%
  - Dwellings: 0
- Time zone: UTC−5 (EST)
  - Summer (DST): UTC−4 (EDT)
- Postal code(s): G1K 5N1
- Area codes: 418 and 581
- Highways: No major routes

Notre-Dame-des-Anges (French pronunciation: [nɔtʁə dam dez‿ɑ̃ʒ]) is a parish municipality in Quebec, Canada, home of the General Hospital of Quebec.

Enclaved within the territory of Quebec City, the municipality has a population of 241 and measures only 6 hectares (15 acres) in area, making it the smallest incorporated municipal entity in Canada.

It lacks any governmental structure and has no mayor but rather an "administrator."

== History ==
The land near the Saint-Charles River was first possessed as a fief by the Recollect Friars Minor, who built the Friary of St. Charles there around 1620. The Recollects were expelled by the British in 1629. The seigneury then passed to the Jesuits in late 1629, after the return of the friars to France following the capitulation of Quebec to the Kirk brothers by Champlain on 14 September 1629. The property was returned to the Recollects upon their return to New France in 1670, at which time they dedicated their house to Notre-Dame-des-Anges (Our Lady of the Angels), so named for the first community of the Franciscan Order.

In 1692, it was purchased by Jean-Baptiste de Saint-Vallier, Bishop of Quebec, to found a hospital, which he did the subsequent year. In 1722, it was established as a civil parish and in 1855, the parish municipality was officially founded with the goal of protecting its sole occupant, the Hôpital général de Québec, from taxes.

== Geography ==
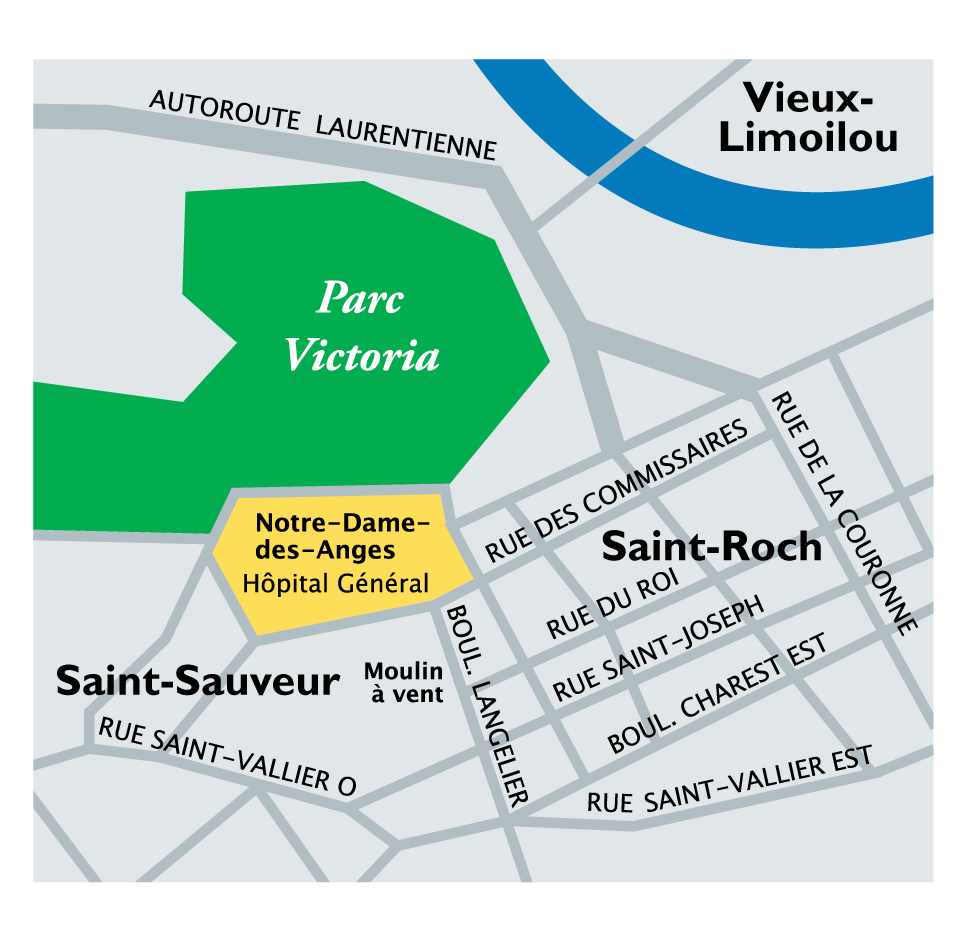

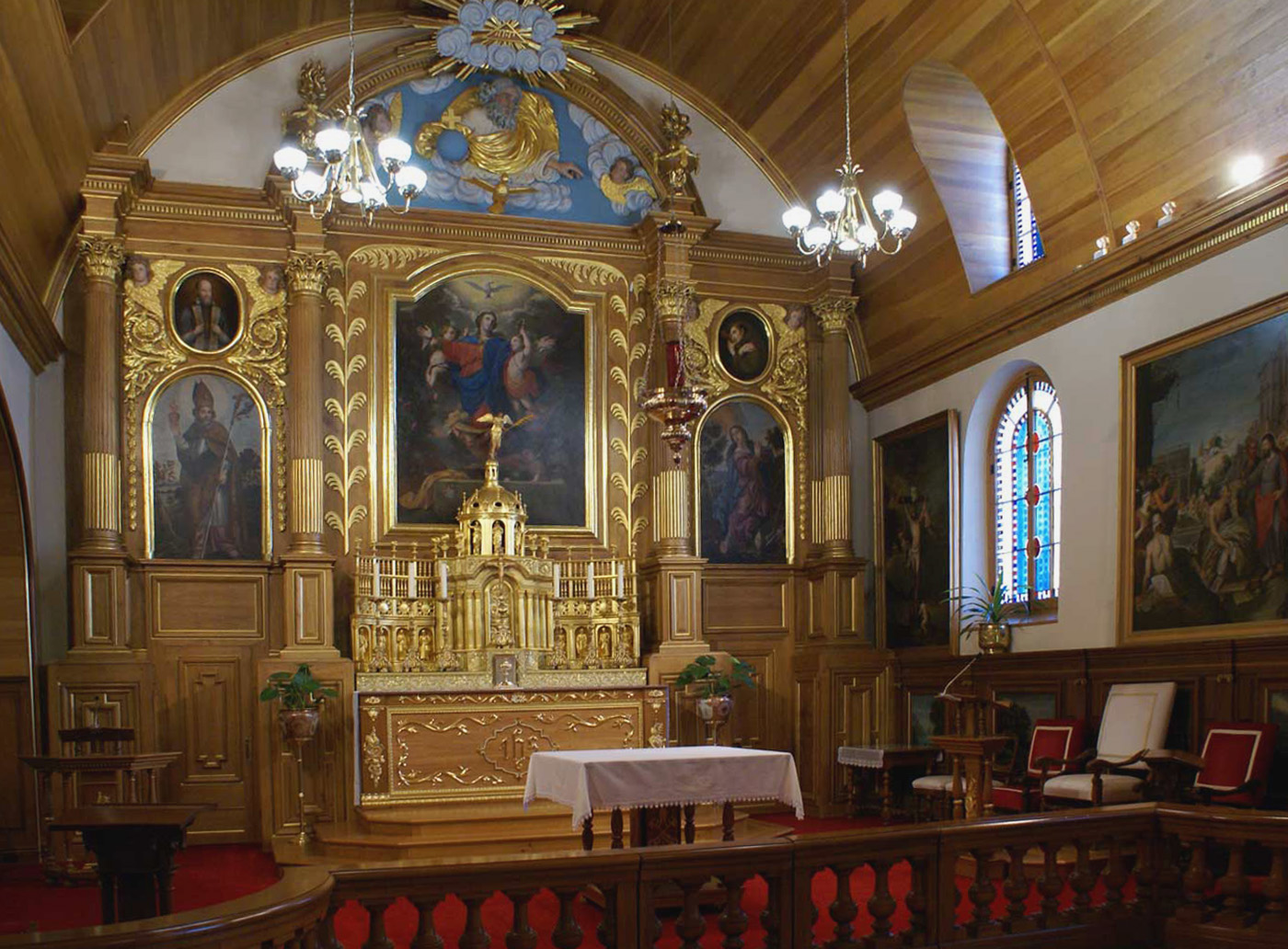

The municipality is situated north of downtown Quebec City, enclaved within the borough of La Cité-Limoilou, bounded by avenue Simon-Napoléon-Parent, rue des Commissaires Ouest, and rue Saint-Anselme.

It is entirely occupied by the Hôpital Général de Québec, including the CLSC Basse-Ville–Limoilou–Vanier, and by the various religious buildings associated with the hospital, including an Augustine monastery, the Église de Notre-Dame-des-Anges (the parish church), and a museum. The hospital is surrounded by a cemetery holding, among others, the remains of General Louis-Joseph de Montcalm.

It is one of two enclaves in Quebec City (along with the Wendake Indian reserve) that was not subject to the municipal mergers in 2002. It is also by far the smallest municipality not included in one of Quebec's Regional County Municipalities.

== Demographics ==
Historical population
Year	Pop.	±%
1991	455	—
1996	370	−18.7%
2001	409	+10.5%
2006	437	+6.8%
2011	394	−9.8%
2016	318	−19.3%
2021	241	−24.2%

In the 2021 Census of Population conducted by Statistics Canada, Notre-Dame-des-Anges had a population of 241 living in 0 of its 0 total private dwellings, a change of −24.2% from its 2016 population of 318. With a land area of 0.04 km^{2} (0.015 sq mi), it had a population density of 6,025.0/km^{2} (15,604.7/sq mi) in 2021.

== See also ==
- Saint-Louis-de-Gonzague-du-Cap-Tourmente
