= Hôpital-Général de Québec =

Coordinates: 46°48′52.2″N 71°13′54.56″W

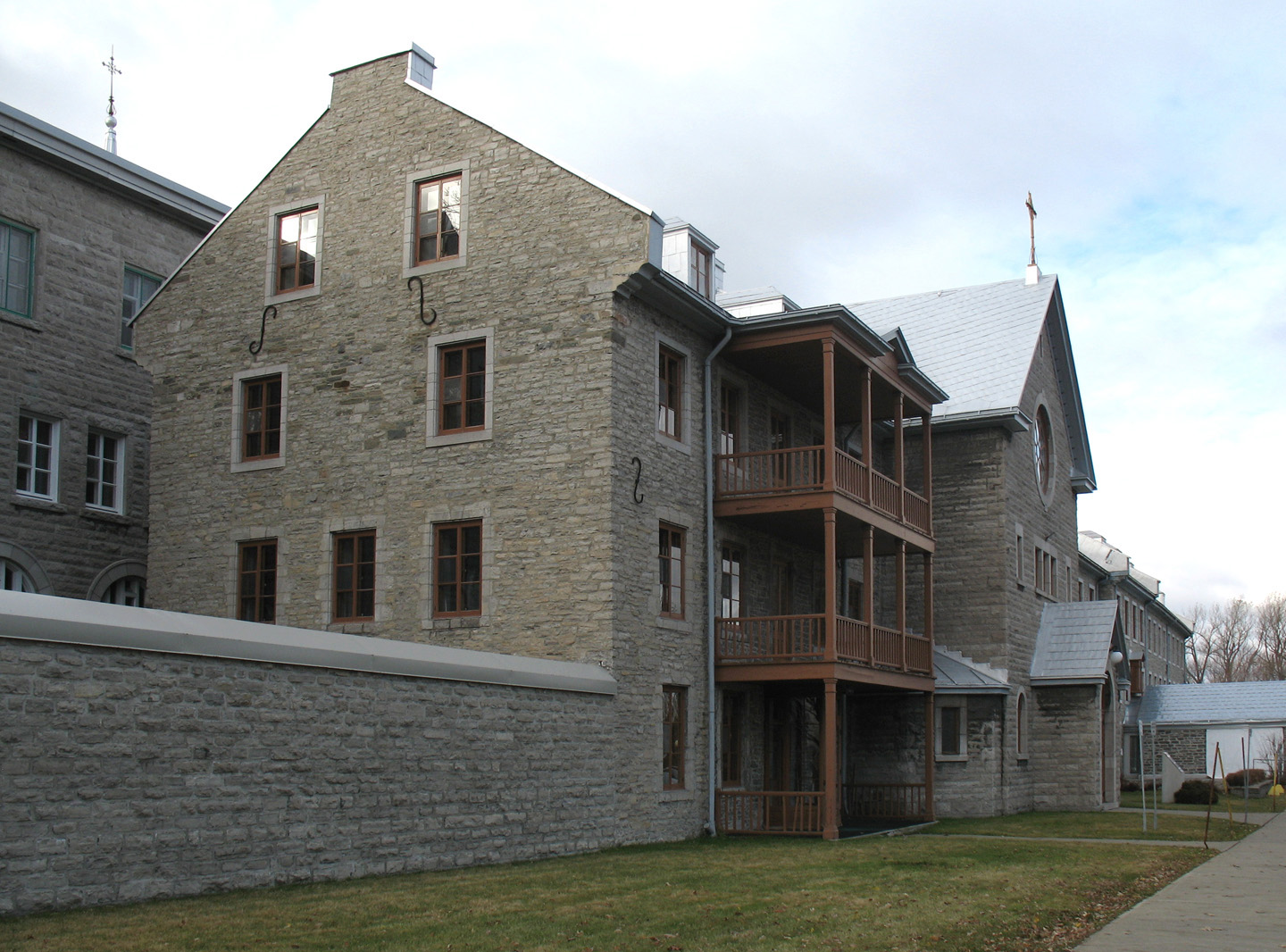
- Hôpital-Général de Québec
- Alternative names: Centre d'hébergement, Quebec General Hospital; HGQ

General information
- Type: Hospital
- Location: Notre-Dame-des-Anges, Quebec, Canada
- Construction started: 1692
- Inaugurated: 1692
- Owner: Centre de santé et des services sociaux de la Vieille-Capitale

Hôpital général de Québec (Centre d'hébergement Hôpital général de Québec)
- Centre de sante et de services sociaux de la Vieille-Capitale

Geography
- Location: Notre-Dame-des-Anges, Quebec City, Quebec, Canada

Organization
- Care system: Public Medicare (Canada)
- Type: Geratric centre

Services
- Beds: 320

History
- Founded: 1692

Links
- Website: http://www.csssvc.qc.ca/services/c_h_HGQ.php
- Lists: Hospitals in Canada

The Hôpital-Général de Québec is a Canadian medical facility located in the tiny municipality of Notre-Dame-des-Anges, Quebec (which consists solely of the hospital), surrounded by the La Cité-Limoilou borough of Quebec City. It was classified as a historic site in 1977 by the Quebec government. Additionally, an archeological site listed on the Inventaire des sites archéologiques du Québec (Register of archeological sites of Quebec) is located there.

The central portion of the hospital cemetery, where over 1,000 French and British soldiers who died in the battles of the Plains of Abraham and Sainte-Foy are interred, is a National Historic Site of Canada. French general Louis-Joseph de Montcalm, killed at the Plains of Abraham, was buried at the cemetery in 2001.

== History ==
The hospital was founded in 1692 by Jean-Baptiste de Saint-Vallier, the second Bishop of Quebec. He had just acquired the Friary of Our Lady of the Angels (Notre-Dame-des-Anges) from the Recollect Friars Minor, who then relocated to the Place d'Armes within the town. The bishop had the friary building converted for use as a hospital, to care for the poor of the region.

The following year, Saint-Vallier requested that the Canonesses of St. Augustine of the Mercy of Jesus, who had founded the Hôtel-Dieu de Québec, send some of its members to Notre-Dame-des-Anges to help in the running of the hospital. In response, four canonesses arrived to take up this work. In 1698 the bishop entrusted the institution completely to the canonesses of the Hôtel-Dieu. The community of the canonesses operating the General Hospital formed an independent monastery in 1701.

Over time, the hospital began to specialize in the chronic care of the aged and poor.

== Current status ==
The Hôpital-Général now serves as a long-term care home for elderly people suffering from cognitive deficits, under the name Centre d'hébergement Hôpital général de Québec. It is operated by the Centre intégré universitaire de santé et de services sociaux de la Capitale-Nationale (CIUSSSCN), the area's health and social services authority.

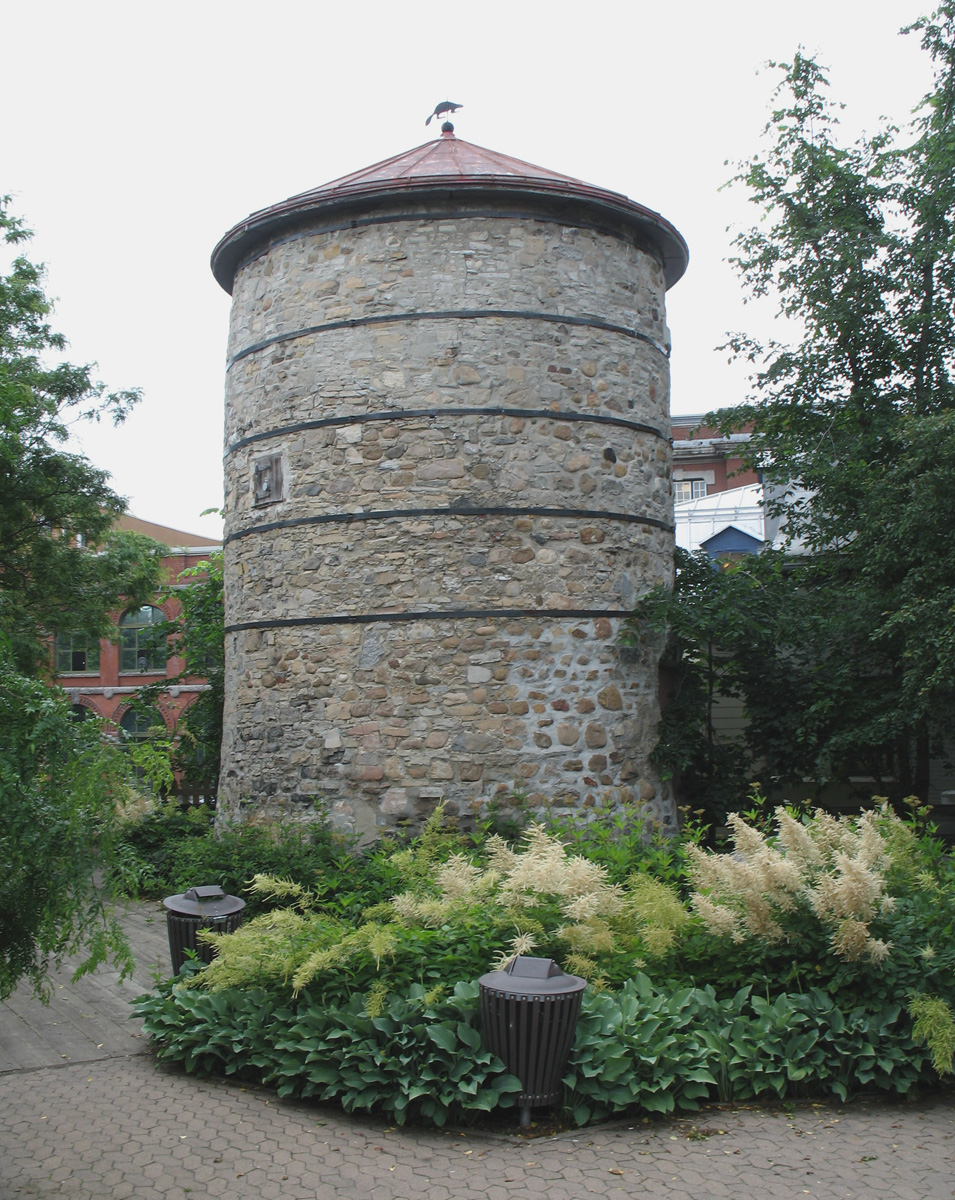
The windmill of the Hôpital-Général de Québec is located outside the main hospital building.

The building includes a museum, which houses many works of art from the 17th and 18th centuries done by local artists. Prominent among them is the work of a member of the community, Mother Marie-Madeleine de Saint-Louis Maufils, O.S.A. (1671–1702), who developed a unique style in painting scenes of the city, and who died from nursing victims of an outbreak of smallpox in the region. The remains of Bishop Saint-Valliers are entombed in the monastery chapel, built by the Recollect friars in 1671.

== Historical publications ==
- Répertoire des mariages de l'Hôpital général de Québec (Paroisse Notre-Dame-des-Anges) - 1693-1961, compiled by Benoit Pontbriand, Société Canadienne de Généalogie (Québec), 35 pages.(in French)

== See also ==
- Notre-Dame-des-Anges, Quebec
- Louise Soumande, first mother superior of the Hôpital-Général de Quebec
