= Promontory of Quebec =

Part of Quebec City

Promontory of Quebec French: Colline de Québec
- Plateau
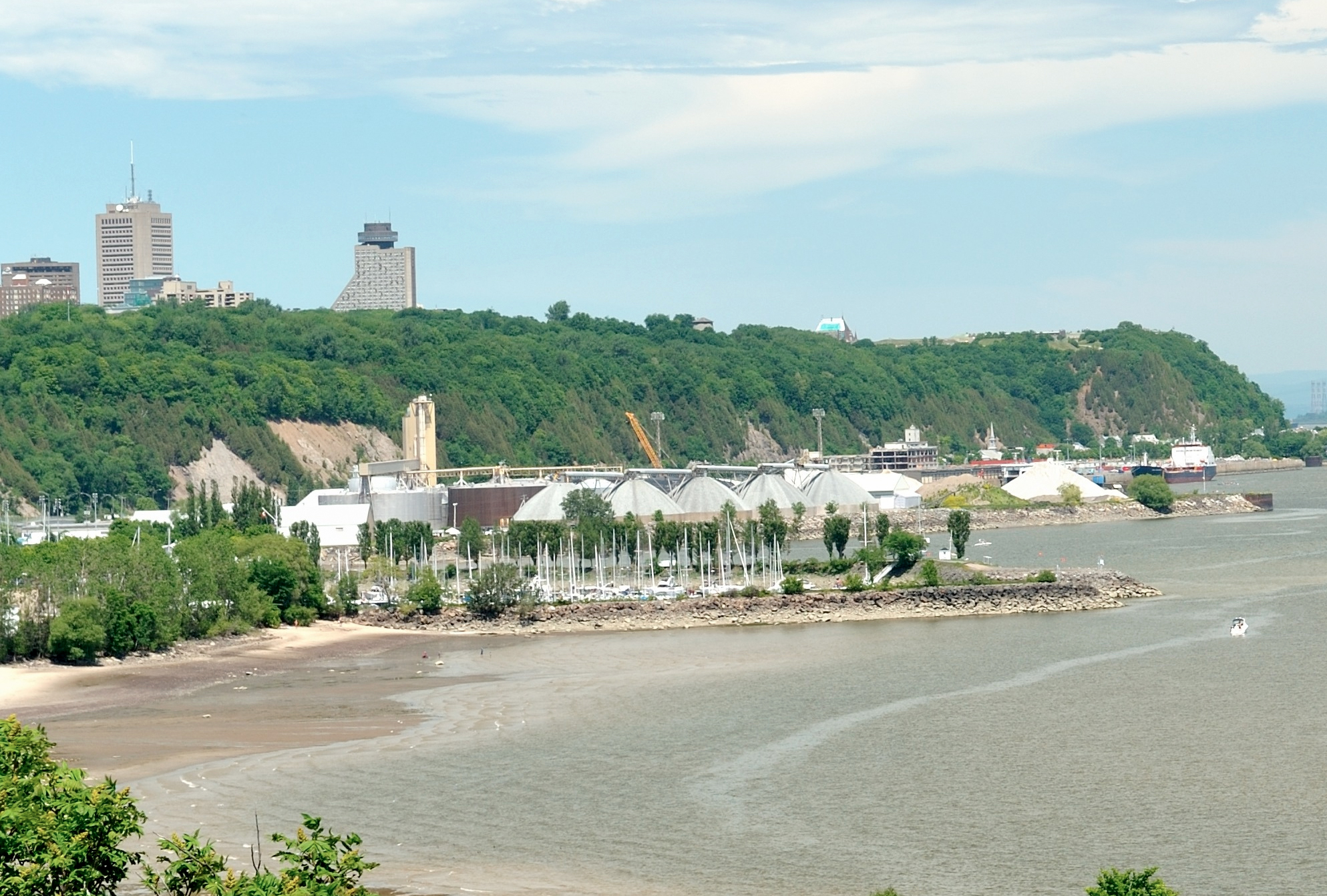
- View from Anse-au-Foulon, with Cap Diamant to the east

- Topographic map of the Promontory of Quebec
- Coordinates: 46°46′19″N 71°18′07″W
- Location: Quebec City, Quebec, Canada
- Orogeny: Appalachian
- Geology: Schist

Dimensions
  - Length: 13 km (8.1 mi)
  - Width: 1–4 km (0.62–2.49 mi)
- Highest elevation: 110 m (360 ft) (Sainte-Foy Summit)
- Topo map: NTS 21L14 Québec

In Quebec City, the term promontory of Quebec refers to the area on which the upper part of the borough of La Cité-Limoilou is built, including Old Quebec (where the promontory is referred to as Cap Diamant). This area covers the eastern half of a larger plateau attested in French as colline or even plate-forme de Québec (Quebec hill). The western portion of this plateau is occupied by upper Sainte-Foy–Sillery–Cap-Rouge (ie. most of this borough — whereas for La Cité-Limoilou, less than half of it is located uptown).

== History ==
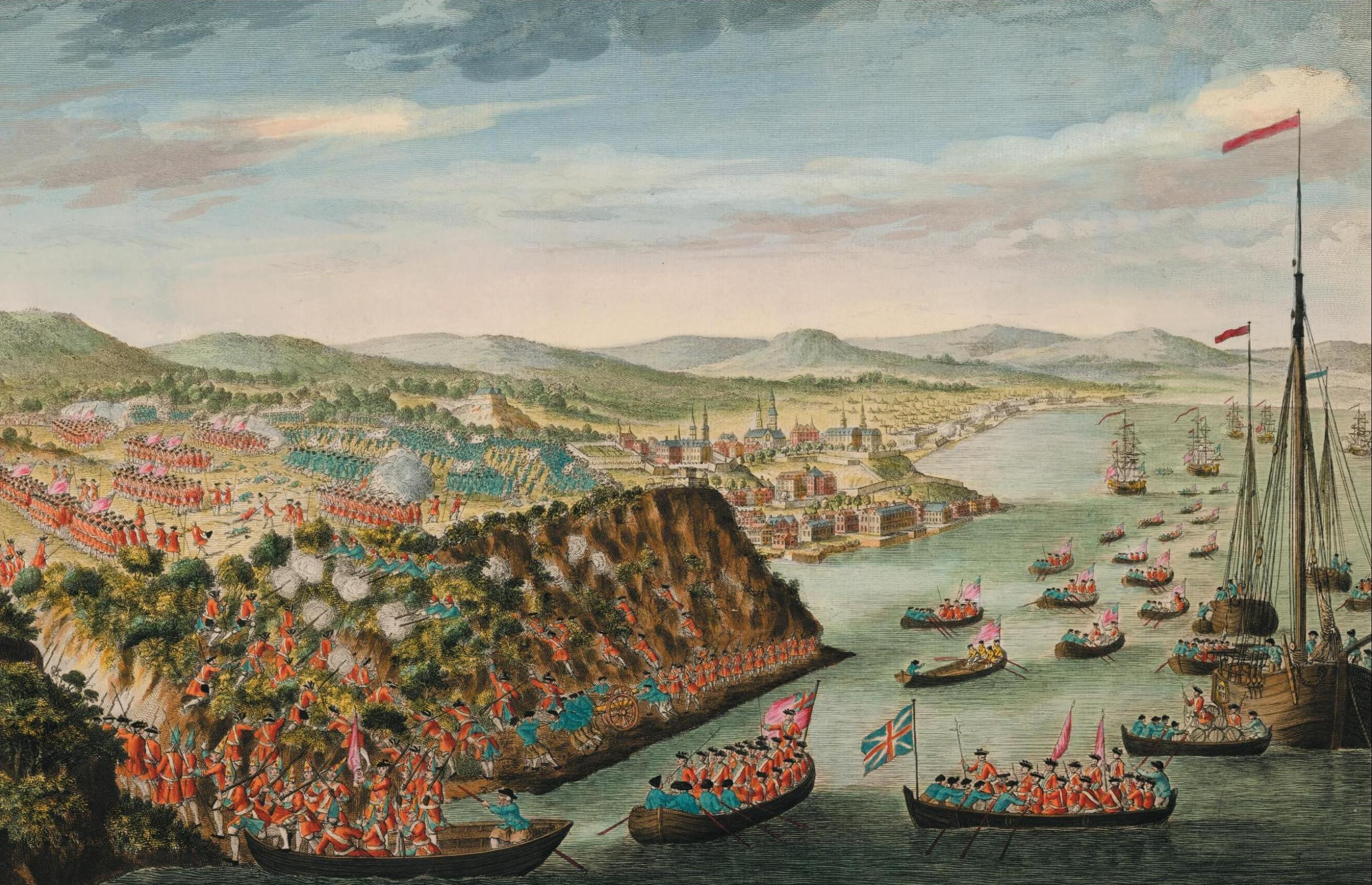
Unrealistic painting of the climbing of the promontory

Although the southern slope is very steep, it was climbed by British soldiers at nighttime in September 1759, so they could take the French by surprise (who were probably expecting Wolfe's troops to arrive through a more convenient path) and engage in the decisive Battle of the Plains of Abraham.

Its escarpments were historically a challenge for the authorities because of the risk of rockfall and the ways of travelling between upper and lower town. Nowadays, roads, a free escalator (named du Faubourg), the Old Quebec Funicular, and 20 stairs with an official toponym connect downtown with its upper counterpart. All of the stairs are within the borough of La Cité-Limoilou. The longest, escalier du Cap-Blanc (398 steps), was designed in wood by noted architect Charles Baillairgé in 1868 (although renovated many times since then) and is the only one that truly goes to the top of the hill, to the south of the Plains of Abraham. On the northern flank of the promontory, where a majority of stairs are found, the highest portion is not steep enough to warrant their need up there. Hence, the second longest is the Franciscains, with 177 steps going up to the neighborhood of Montcalm (fr). The shortest real public stair is the Quai-du-Roi in the Petit Champlain quarter, which has 30 (anti-slip) steps.

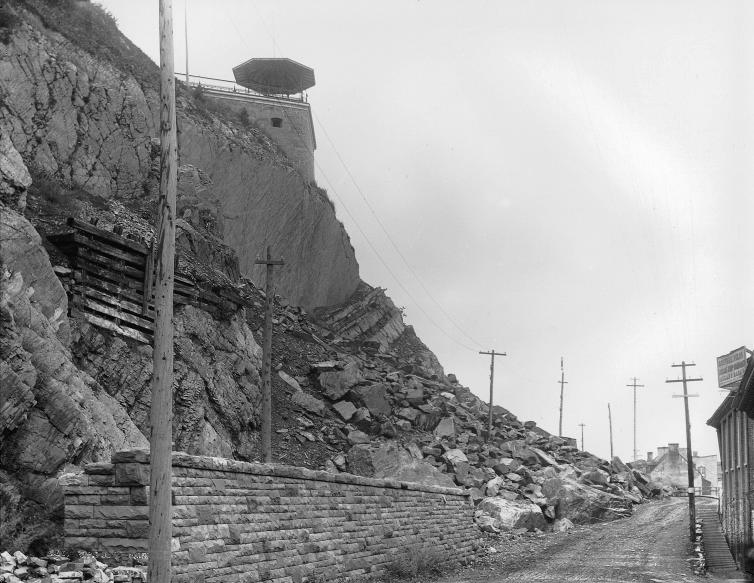
Aftermath of the rockslide of 1889.

53 rockfalls, causing 88 fatalities, 70 injuries and the destruction of 20 houses, have been recorded since 1775. Two events were notable: the rockslide of 1841 (32 deaths) and the rockslide of 1889 (35 deaths), and both seem to have been caused by faulty infrastructure. In 1889, a drain from the moat of the Quebec Citadelle became clogged. The water leaked through a small fracture in the rock but the pressure became too high which led to an implosion in the stone. Mitigation measures such as net fences were however implemented during the 20th century, which drastically reduced the number of incidents.

== Geography of the Quebec hill ==
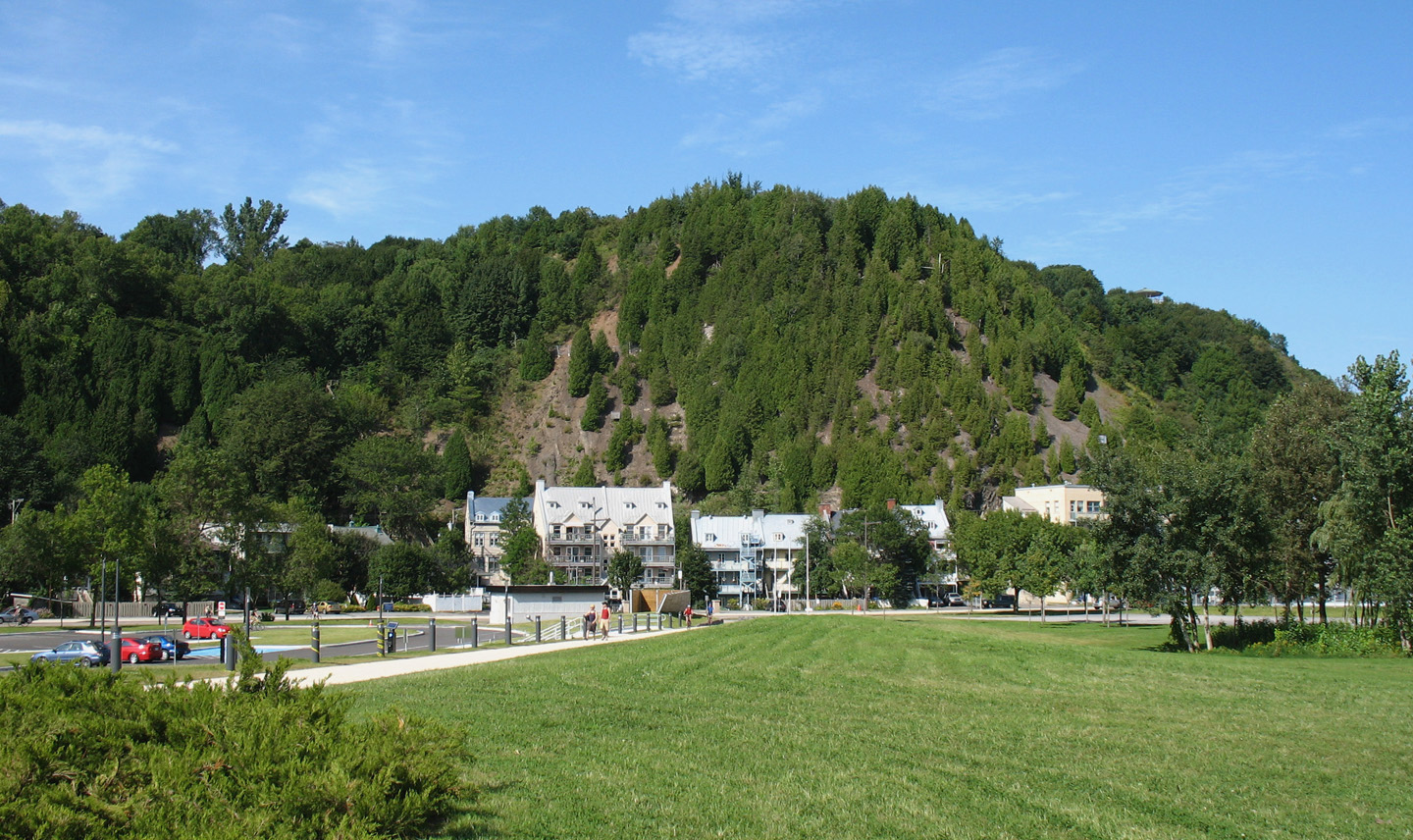
The cedars of Cap-Blanc.

The plateau, which includes the promontory of Quebec, is 13 kilometres (8.1 mi) long, and has its maximum width in the west (4 kilometres (2.5 mi)) while the historical and eastern extremity averages 1 kilometre (0.62 mi). The highest point is located at the centre-west of the hill, in the former city of Sainte-Foy (110 metres (360 ft)). Overall, it is bounded to the northeast by the Saint-Charles River and to the south by the Saint Lawrence River. In the vicinity of the Plains of Abraham, just west of Cap Diamant (100 metres (330 ft)) of altitude), the slopes are notable for containing white-cedars growing directly on the rock. This area is called "Cap-Blanc" (fr) (White Cape), which is possibly a translation of a descriptive Innu toponym. Before the 20th century, there were less trees on this cape, as rockfalls were more frequent, so the greyish colour of the rock was more apparent. Its neutral tint also contrasted with the reddish minerals covering the slopes of the southwestern extremity of the hill, in the locality already named Cap-Rouge (Red Cape).

Geologically, the Quebec hill is a nappe of the Appalachian Mountains as well as its only intrusion on the north side of the Saint Lawrence River. On the northern side of the plateau, runs the Logan's Fault (fr), a prominent area of inactive thrust faulting first documented by William Logan, and marking the boundary between the geologic provinces of the Appalachian and of the Saint Lawrence Lowlands.

The western side of the plateau is mostly made of sandstone and mudstone, while towards Old Quebec the eastern half rests on stony schist. In the early days of the colony, these schist stones were used as building material but this eventually stopped as they were considered to be of poor quality. Sandstone from the hill at Sillery was then used, but also limestone from quarries in nearby Beauport, Sainte-Anne-de-Beaupré and Saint-Marc-des-Carrières. Beneath the plateau, the substrate is mostly made of sand and pebbles originating from the retreat of the post-glacial Champlain Sea.

== Gallery ==
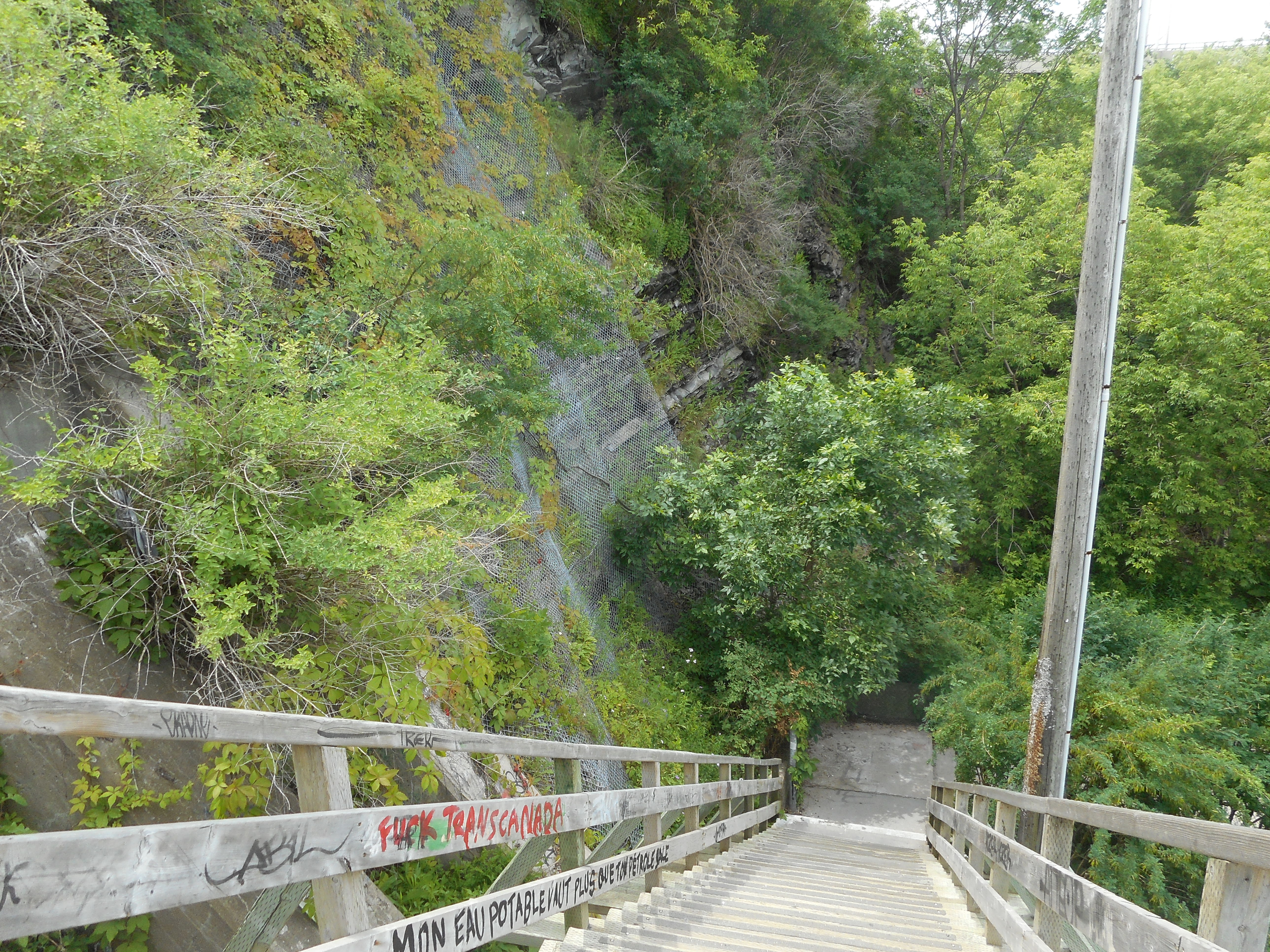
A rockfall net behind des Glacis stairs.

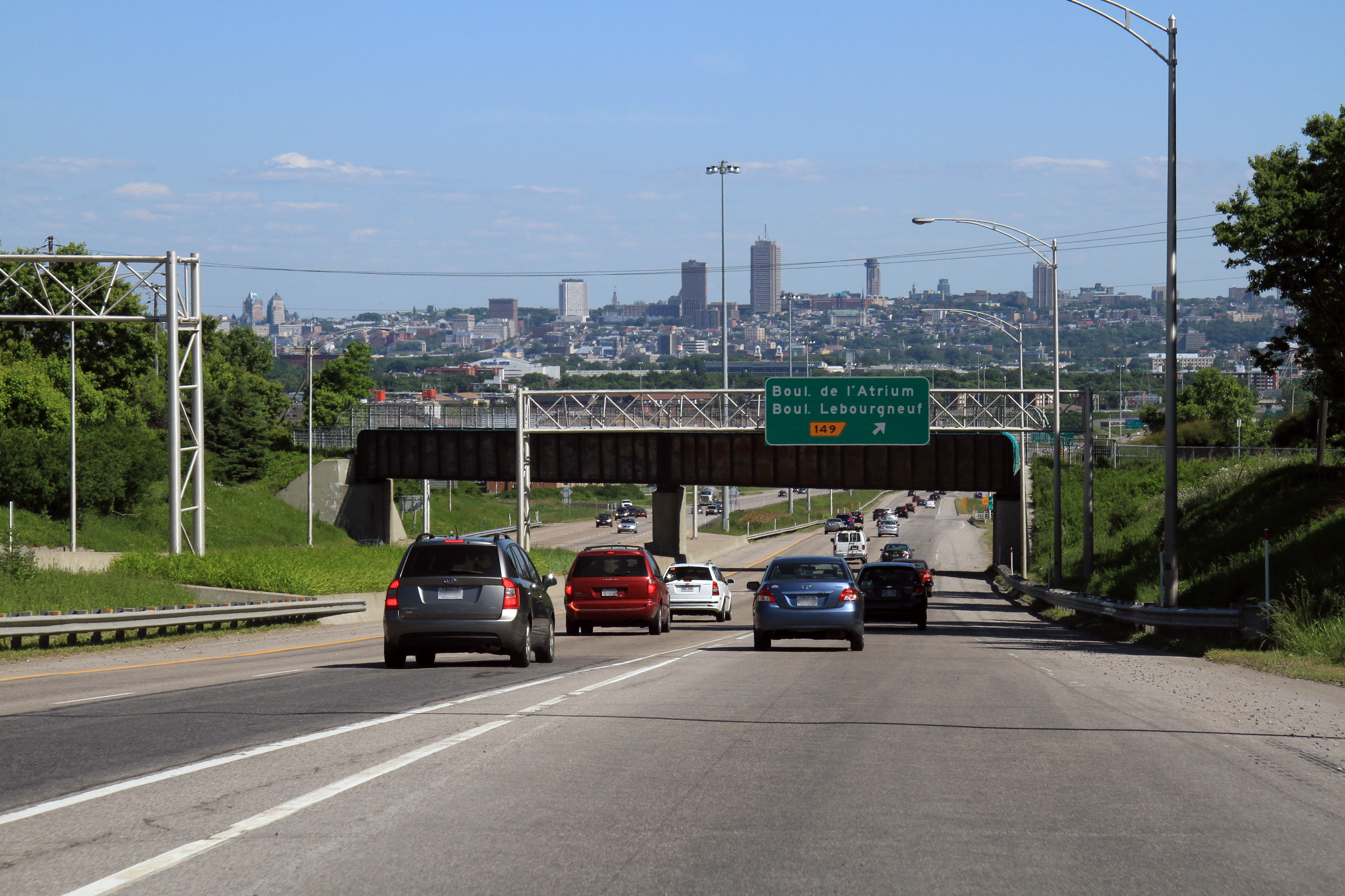
Southward view from Autoroute 73.

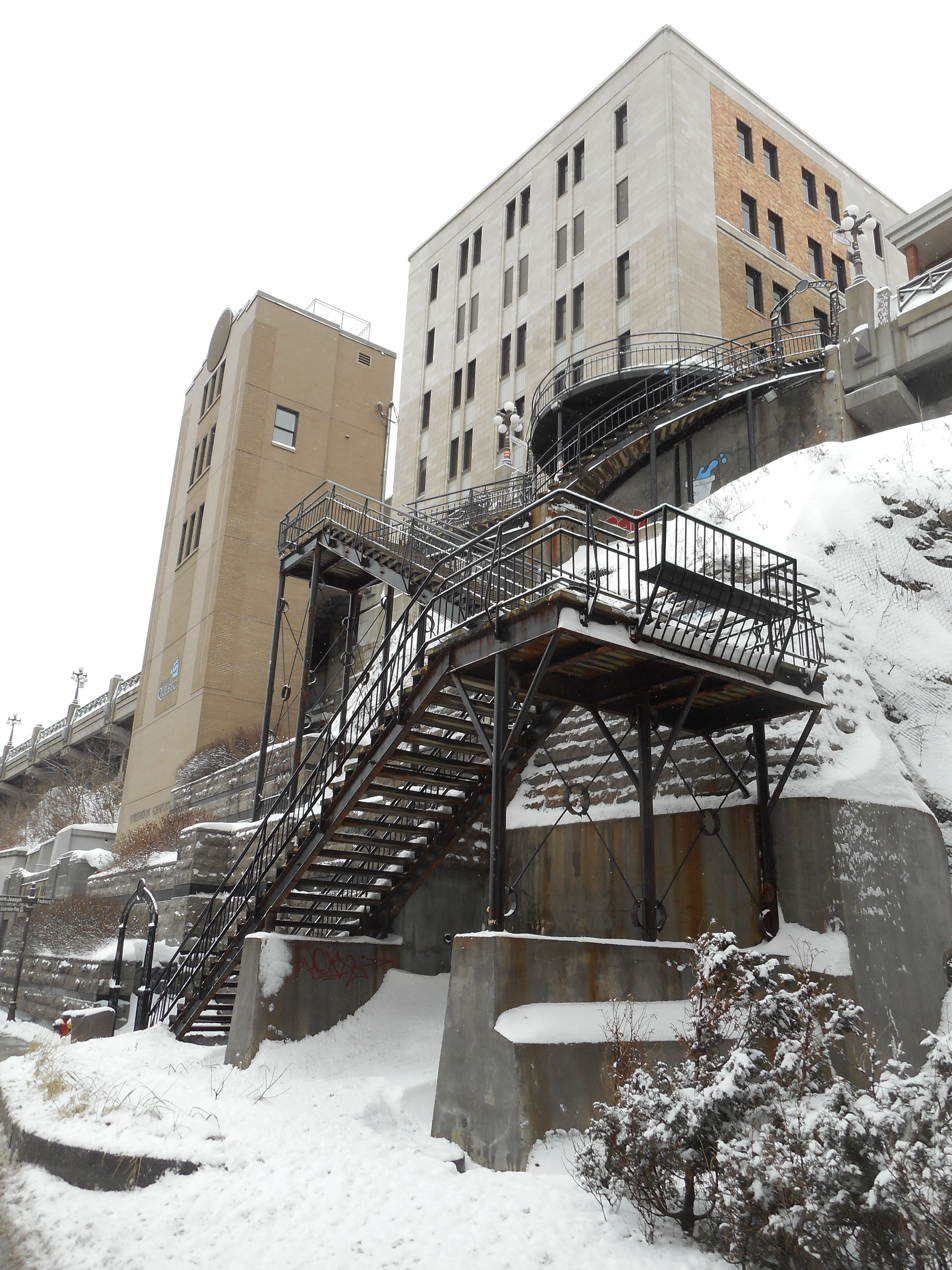
du Faubourg elevator and stairs.

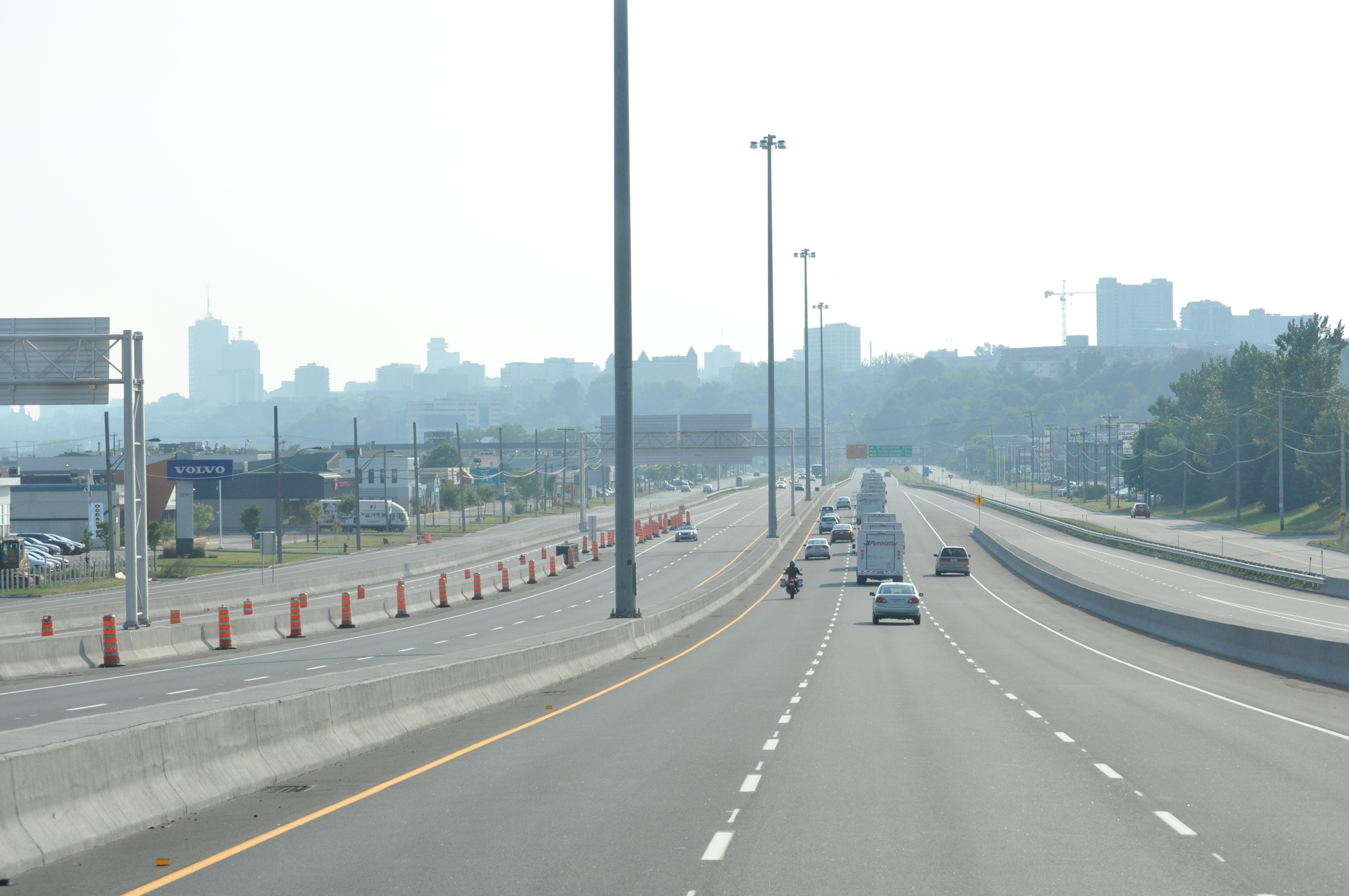
Autoroute 440 runs along the northern flank of the hill.
