= René-Louis Chartier de Lotbinière =

French-Canadian Poet

René-Louis Chartier de Lotbinière (French pronunciation: [ʁəne lwi ʃaʁtje də lɔtbinjɛʁ]; 1641–1709) was a French-Canadian Poet, 1st Seigneur de Lotbinière in New France (1672), Judge of the Provost and Admiralty Courts and Chief Councillor of the Sovereign Council of New France.

== Birth ==
Baptised 14 November 1641, in the Church of Saint-Nicholas-des-Champs in Paris, he was the son of Louis-Théandre Chartier de Lotbinière and Élisabeth d'Amours de Clignancourt (1613–1690), daughter of Louis d'Amours de Louvieres (died 1640), Sieur de Serain, Chief Councillor to King Henry IV of France at the Grand Châtelet, Paris. He was the brother-in-law of Philippe de Rigaud Vaudreuil, Governor General of New France, and the uncle of the last Governor General of New France, Pierre François de Rigaud, Marquis de Vaudreuil-Cavagnal. In 1651, at the age of ten, he arrived with his parents in New France, and was educated at the Jesuit's College in Quebec City.

== Career ==
As an officer in the 1660s he took part in some early campaigns against the Iroquois and Mohawks, soon after composing his first known poem. Following in his father's shoes he was appointed Deputy Attorney-General of New France in 1670. In 1672, he was granted a Seigneury which he named after one of his family's old seigneuries in France, Lotbinière, which had since been passed to the Chateaubriand family of Combourg as a wedding dowry. (Note: Lotbinière's seigneury formed the basis of what is now the municipality of Lotbinière in the Lotbinière Regional County Municipality) Two years later his name was put forward by the Compagnie des Indes Occidentales and appointed a Councillor of the Sovereign Council of New France. The following year he was made a Councillor for life by King Louis XIV, the only such Councillor to hold the appointment by the King. In 1677, he replaced his father as Lieutenant-General for Civil and Criminal Affairs (Judge) of the Provost Court.

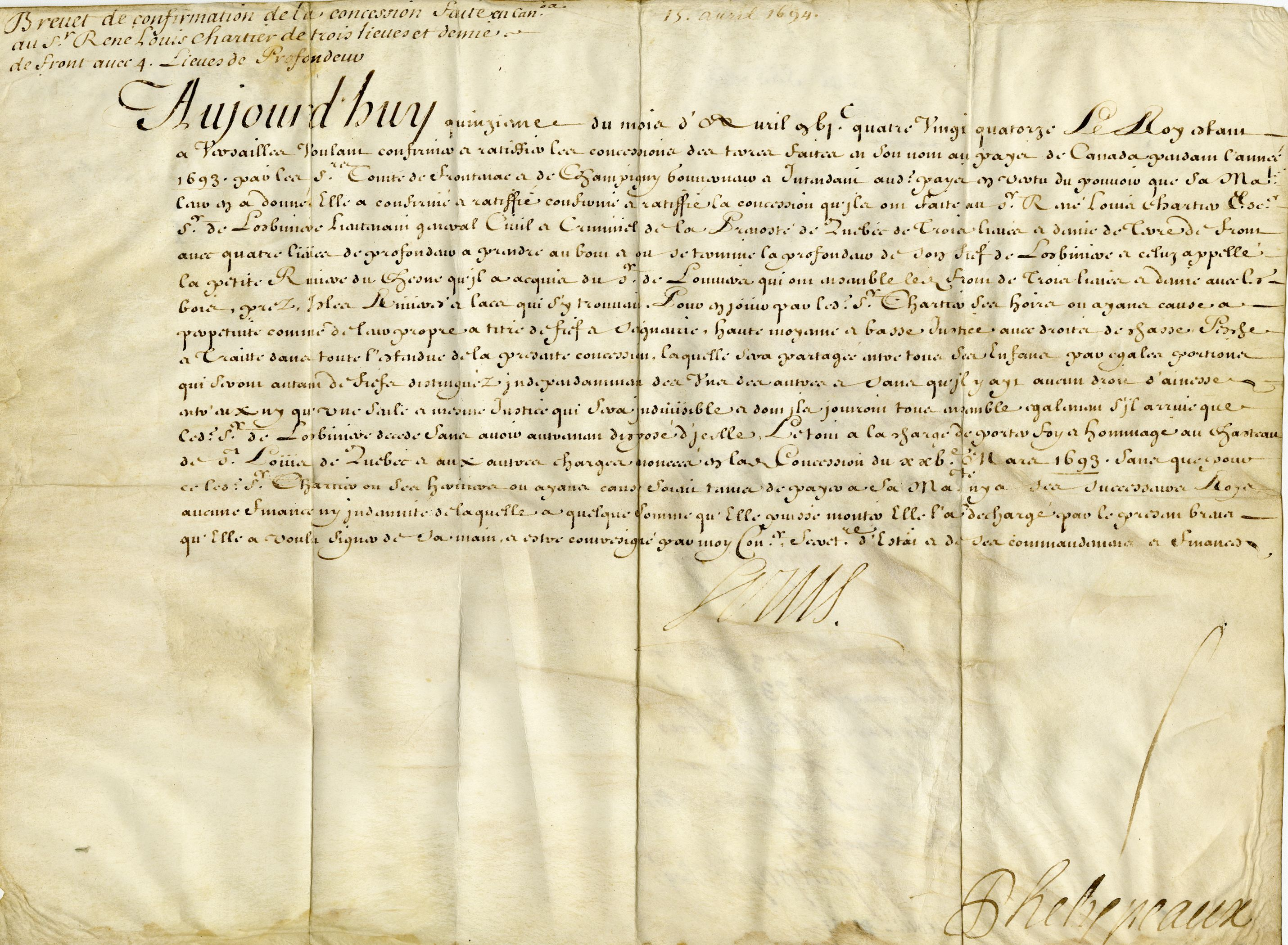
Patent confirming a concession in Canada by the King to René-Louis Chartier de Lotbinière, April 15, 1694.

In stark contrast to his father, he held this position to the great satisfaction of his peers, yet again drawing the praise of Louis XIV for his honesty and competence. In 1698, he was appointed Judge of the Admiralty Court. Bishop Jean-Baptiste de La Croix de Chevrières de Saint-Vallier appointed him a director of the Hôpital général de Québec, and he also intermittently served as subdelegate to the Intendant of New France from 1677 to 1706. In 1703, Louis XIV appointed de Lotbiniere as Chief Counsellor of the Sovereign Council of New France, ranking fourth in the hierarchy of the colony, being preceded only by the governor, the intendant, and the bishop.

== Military ==
De Lotbinière had maintained his connections to the military after his early campaigns against the Iroquois. In 1673, he had been promoted to lieutenant colonel of the Quebec Militia, and in 1684 again accompanied Joseph-Antoine de La Barre in campaigns against the Iroquois as Commander of the Regiment of Quebec. At the Siege of Quebec 1690 he was the colonel of the Quebec militia in the defence of the colony.

== Family ==
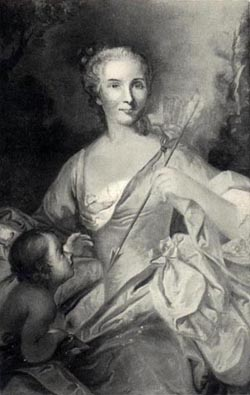
René-Louis's well-known granddaughter, Angelique-Genevieve Renaud d'Avène des Méloizes (1722–1792), c.1754

At Quebec City in 1678, de Lotbinière married Marie Madeleine Lambert du Mont (1662–1695), daughter of Eustache Lambert du Mont (1618–1673), Seigneur and Commandant of the Quebec Militia. After his father returned to France in 1679, they lived at his old house, Maison Lotbinière in Quebec, where all his children were born and where he died. René-Louis and his wife were the parents of seven children,

- Rene-Louis Chartier de Lotbinière (1681–1718), became an officer in the French Royal Army and was killed at Louisiana.
- Antoine Chartier de Lotbinière (1684–1743). His godparents were Joseph-Antoine de La Barre, Governor General of New France; and Madame Charles Aubert de La Chesnaye. He became a Récollet priest and went by the name Valentin.
- Pierre-Alain Chartier de Lotbinière (1686–1713), lived and died at La Rochelle, France.
- Eustache Chartier de Lotbinière, married Marie-Francoise Renaud d'Avène des Méloizes, daughter of Captain François-Marie Renaud d'Avène des Meloizes. They were the parents of Michel Chartier de Lotbinière, Marquis de Lotbinière.
- Louise-Philippe Chartier de Lotbinière (1690–1725). In 1708, she married Captain Francois Mariauchau d'Esgly (1670–1730), of the Dauphin's Regiment and the Governor-General's Guards; King's Lieutenant at Trois-Rivières. They were the parents of Louis-Philippe Mariauchau d'Esgly, 8th Bishop of Quebec.
- Marie-Louise Chartier de Lotbinière (1691–1761). In 1709, she married Captain Louis Denys de La Ronde (1675–1741), Cross of Saint-Louis. He was the brother of Admiral Simon-Pierre Denys de Bonaventure and brother-in-law of Claude de Ramezay of Château Ramezay, Governor of Montreal. They were the grandparents of Major-General Pierre Denys de LaRonde (1762–1824) who commanded the Louisiana militia at the Battle of New Orleans and founded Versailles, Louisiana. They were the great-grandparents of Micaela Almonester, Baroness de Pontalba, who built the Pontalba Buildings in New Orleans and the Hôtel de Pontalba in Paris, where she lived for the last twenty years of her life.
- Angelique de Lotbinière (1692–1772), was married twice. In 1712, she married Jean-Francois Martin de Lino de Chalmette, Attorney General of New France. Their son, Louis Xavier Martin de Lino de Chalmette founded Chalmette, Louisiana, and married the sister of Antoine Philippe de Marigny, grandfather of Bernard de Marigny. The Battle of New Orleans was fought at Chalmette, Louisiana, on the plantation of Louis's son, Ignace Martin de Lino de Chalmette. In 1722, Angelique married Captain Nicolas-Marie Renaud d'Avène des Méloizes (1696–1743), Comte des Meloizes and Chevalier de St Louis, whose sister was married to her brother, Eustache. They were the parents of Angelique-Genevieve d'Avene des Meloizes, the subject of Nadine Grelet's book, La Belle Angelique (2003) and one of the two central figures in William Kirby's classic book, The Golden Dog (1873). She was married to Michel-Jean-Hugues de Pean (directly descended from Hugues de Payens), but better known for her affair with François Bigot. Her brother, Nicolas Renaud d'Avene des Meloizes-Fresnoy (1729–1803), became the Marquis de Fresnoy through his marriage to the heiress Agathe-Louise de Fresnoy.
