= Juchereau =

Juchereau is a surname. Notable people with the name include:

- Charlotte-Françoise Juchereau de St. Denis (1660–1732), French-Canadian feudal countess, fief holder and businessperson
- Louis Juchereau de St. Denis (1676–1744), French Canadian soldier and explorer, developer of the Louisiana (New France) and Spanish Texas regions
- Antoine Juchereau Duchesnay (seigneur) (1740–1806), Seigneur of Beauport, Saint-Denis, Fossambault, Gaudarville, and Saint-Roch-des-Aulnaies
- Antoine-Louis Juchereau Duchesnay (1767–1825), seigneur, soldier and political figure in Lower Canada
- Édouard-Louis-Antoine-Charles Juchereau Duchesnay (1809–1886), political figure in Canada East, Conservative member of the Senate of Canada
- Elzéar-Henri Juchereau Duchesnay (1809–1871), seigneur, lawyer and political figure in Canada East
- Henri-Jules Juchereau Duchesnay (1845–1887), lawyer, farmer and political figure in Quebec
- Michel-Louis Juchereau Duchesnay (1785–1838), Canadian officer, seigneur, and justice of the peace
- Noël Juchereau (1593–1648), early pioneer in New France (now Québec, Canada), and a member of the Company of One Hundred Associates
- Eustache Juchereau de Saint-Denys (1809–1883), lawyer, diplomat, polyglot, correspondent and legislator of French-Canadian origin
- Marie-Jean-Léon Lecoq, Baron d'Hervey de Juchereau, Marquis d'Hervey de Saint-Denys (1822–1892), French sinologist
- Jeanne-Françoise Juchereau de la Ferté de Saint-Ignace (1650–1723), Canadian hospitaller nun of the Order of the Canonesses of St. Augustine of the Mercy of Jesus

== See also ==
- Juchereau Duchesnay surname page
