= Duchesnay =

Duchesnay is a surname. Notable people with the surname include:

- Édouard-Louis-Antoine-Charles Juchereau Duchesnay (1809–1886), Conservative member of the Senate of Canada
- Antoine Juchereau Duchesnay (seigneur) (1740–1806), seigneur and political figure in Lower Canada
- Antoine-Louis Juchereau Duchesnay (1767–1825), seigneur, soldier and political figure in Lower Canada
- Elzéar-Henri Juchereau Duchesnay (1809–1871), seigneur, lawyer and political figure in Canada East
- Isabelle Duchesnay (born 1963), ice dancer who competed for both Canada and France
- Jean-Baptiste Juchereau Duchesnay (1779–1833), Canadian politician, officer, merchant, and seigneur
- Michel-Louis Juchereau Duchesnay (1785–1838), Canadian officer, seigneur, and justice of the peace
- Paul Duchesnay (born 1961), ice dancer who competed for both Canada and France

== Other uses ==
- Duchesnay tourist resort in Quebec
