= Juchereau Duchesnay =

Juchereau Duchesnay is a surname. Notable family members with the surname include:

- Antoine Juchereau Duchesnay (seigneur) (1740–1806), the Seigneur of Beauport, Saint-Denis, Fossambault, Gaudarville, and Saint-Roch-des-Aulnaies
  - Antoine-Louis Juchereau Duchesnay (1767–1825), seigneur, soldier and political figure in Lower Canada, son of Antoine
    - Édouard-Louis-Antoine-Charles Juchereau Duchesnay (1809–1886), political figure in Canada East and a Conservative member of the Senate of Canada, son of Antoine-Louis
      - Henri-Jules Juchereau Duchesnay (1845–1887), lawyer, farmer and political figure in Quebec, son of Édouard-Louis-Antoine-Charles
  - Michel-Louis Juchereau Duchesnay (1785–1838), Canadian officer, seigneur, and justice of the peace, son of Antoine
    - Elzéar-Henri Juchereau Duchesnay (1809–1871), seigneur, lawyer and political figure in Canada East, son of Michel-Louis
