= Duke of Kent House, Quebec =

Coordinates: 46.8116°N 71.2066°W

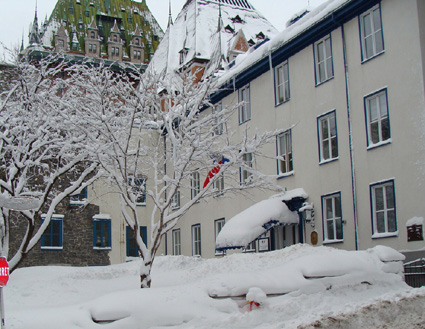
'Kent House', Quebec

Duke of Kent House or Kent House (French: Maison du Duc-de-Kent) is situated on the corner of Rue Saint-Louis and Haldimand, behind the Château Frontenac in Quebec City, named after its most famous resident Prince Edward, Duke of Kent and Strathearn. Though altered and transformed since its original construction, the most part of its foundations and of the first floor walls date back to about 1650, making it one of the oldest houses, if not the oldest house in Quebec City. In 1759, the Articles of Capitulation of Quebec were signed within the house. The present edifice has remained largely unchanged since 1819. It served as the French Consulate from 1980 to 2015.

== Occupants during the French Regime (1650–1763) ==
The first owners of the land on which Kent House stands were Louis d'Ailleboust de Coulonge, 4th Governor of New France from 1648 to 1651, and his wife, Marie-Barbe de Boulogne. Shortly after 1650, they had a house built on this site. Following the death of the late governor's wife in 1665, her property and house on Saint-Louis Street was gifted to the Hôtel-Dieu de Québec.

On May 27, 1671, the Ladies of the Hôtel-Dieu sold the property to Louis-Théandre Chartier de Lotbinière, Lieutenant-General of the Civil and Criminal Courts at Quebec, who at once took up residence there. In 1679, he left for his mother country, never to return to New France, but his widow continued to live there, dying there in 1690. Their son, René-Louis Chartier de Lotbinière, Chief Councillor of the Sovereign Council of New France, lived there from 1679 until his death on June 4, 1709. All of his children were born there (the first cousins of the last Governor General of New France, Pierre de Rigaud, Marquis de Vaudreuil), and after his death they became the joint owners of the property, with the exception of a portion on the east side, which was sold by their father to Madame Vitre in 1674. René-Louis's fourth child, Eustache Chartier de Lotbinière, the first Canadian Dean of Notre-Dame de Québec Cathedral, lived there from 1709 until 1713, until it was agreed to be sold by his brothers and sisters. The Lotbinière house (as it had come to be known) and its dependencies were sold by voluntary decree for 10,000 livres on March 14, 1713, to Jean-Baptiste Maillou, architect and contractor to the King of France at Quebec. The minutes of this sale contain an exact description of the property situated between St. Louis and Mount Carmel streets, and the house, which was said to be:

of masonry erected thereon, measuring about fifty feet in length by thirty in width, consisting oftwo stories, one being the mansard, in which there are four rooms with fire places, a kitchen, two large rooms and two smaller ones, with storerooms underneath and in the attic above, covered with shingles; in front of which house there is vacant ground in which there is a well, also in masonry, and in the rear of the said house are gardens, in which there are a number of fruit trees and an ice house

On Maillou's death in 1753, the house was left to his son, Vital Maillou, who did not live in it but leased it for three years to Michel Chartier de Lotbinière, Marquis de Lotbinière, the son of the previous resident, Eustache Chartier de Lotbinière. The future Marquis de Lotbinière lived there with his wife, the fourth generation of his family to live there.

On June 1, 1758, the house was bought from Maillou by Jean-Baptiste Nicolas Roch de Ramezay, son of Governor Claude de Ramezay and a nephew of Eustache Chartier de Lotbinière's sister, Marie-Louise Denys de la Ronde. De Ramezay had grown up in Montreal at Château Ramezay, built by his father, and had just been promoted King's Lieutenant at Quebec. Following the Battle of the Plains of Abraham, it was de Ramezay who signed the Articles of Capitulation of Quebec before Governor-General James Murray at the house, September 18, 1759. It was the only convenient place at hand which had not suffered from the bombardment of General James Wolfe's artillery.

== Ownership following the Capitulation of New France (1763-1791) ==
Following the British Conquest of New France, de Ramezay maintained ownership of the property until with his permission his wife sold it on August 23, 1763, to John Bondfield, the Quebec merchant who only the following year was forced to flee Canada with his brother, Achlam, because of "an open avowal of the American measures". On August 4, 1764, Bondfield sold the house to London merchant James Strachan, acting for himself and for the London House of Greenwood & Higginson. Strachan sold the property on October 24, 1777, to Hon. Adam Mabane, one of the members of the Executive Council of Quebec under Governor Murray, and Judge of the Quebec Court of Common Pleas. The deed of sale describes the house as of two stories, including the ground story from the St. Louis street side, the entry to which was by a flight of stairs, as exists to-day. It was also stipulated in the deed to leave a free passage of eight feet along the gable of the next house.

== Residence to the Duke of Kent and Madame de St. Laurent (1791-1802) ==
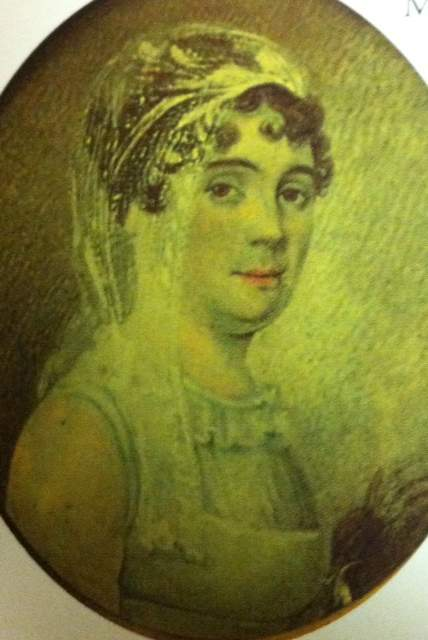
Madame de Saint-Laurent- Mistress of Prince Edward

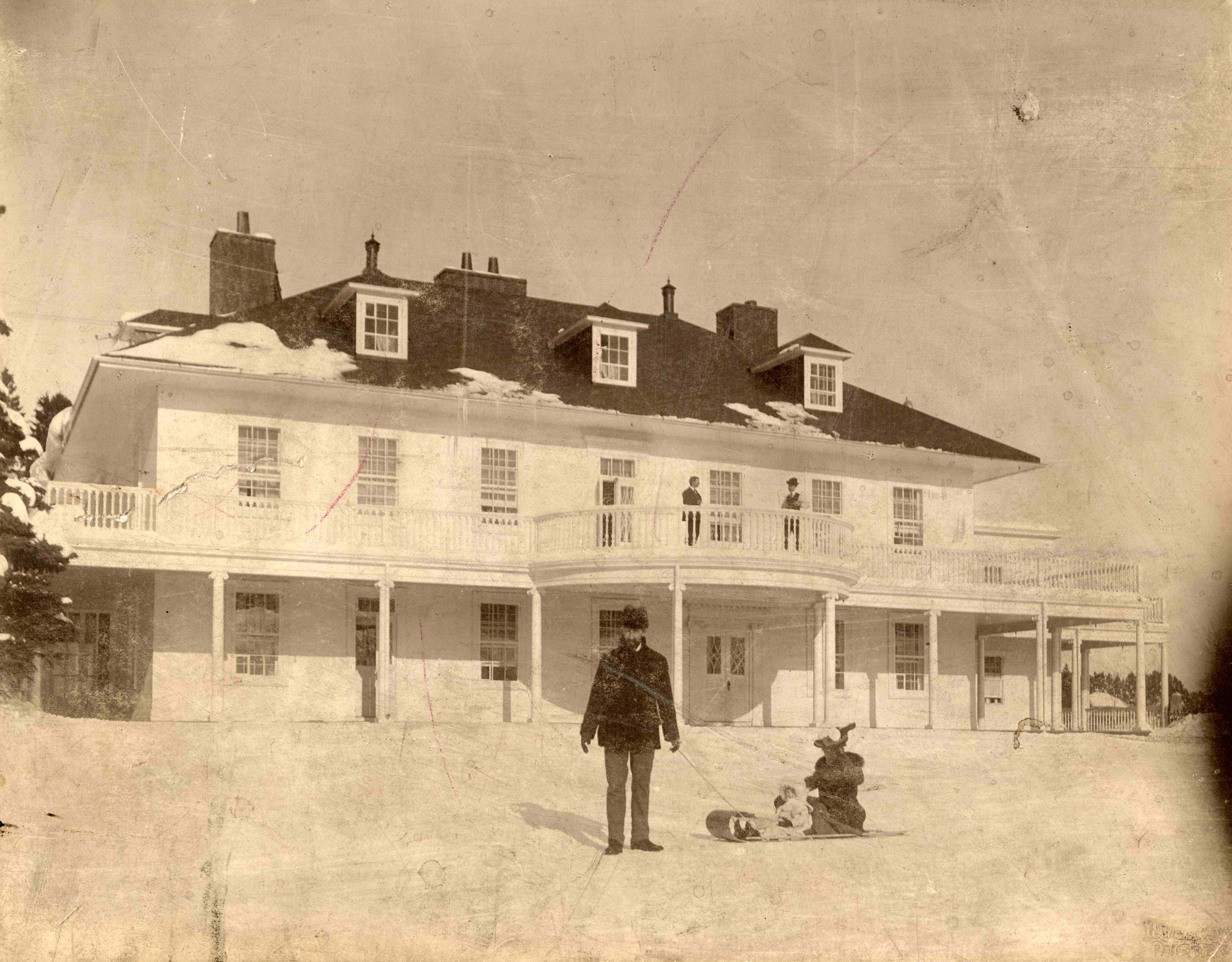
Montmorency House next to the Montmorency Falls around 1900.

On the formation of Lower Canada, in August, 1791, Prince Edward, Duke of Kent and Strathearn arrived in Quebec City and shortly afterwards leased Judge Mabane's house for £90 per annum. He lived there for three happy years with his beautiful mistress, Madame de Saint Laurent, before he was posted to Halifax, Nova Scotia in 1794. Though he did not return to house, he continued to lease it until his departure from Canada in 1802 to take up his new position as Governor of Gibraltar. In his memoirs, Pierre-Ignace Aubert de Gaspé (father of the author of Les Anciens Canadiens), speaks several times of dinners given by the Duke and his mistress at "his fine residence" on Saint-Louis Street, but the Duke preferred his summer home, Montmorency House, seven miles away, next to the Montmorency Falls.

The Duke's mistress with whom he shared the house in Quebec was Madame Alphonsine-Therese-Bernardine-Julie de Montgenet de St. Laurent, the wife of Baron de Fortisson, a colonel in the French service. While in Geneva, the Duke had been introduced to the de Fortissons and soon after Julie and Edward became lovers. The Dukes's father, King George III, enrolled Edward in the army and had him posted to Gibraltar, where Edward made arrangements for her to be smuggled so they could be together. George III later found out about the affair and so sent the Duke to Quebec City as colonel of the 7th Fusiliers. Humiliated, at first he refused to go, but in August 1791 he arrived accompanied by his chatelaine, introduced as Julie de St. Laurent and reputed to be a widow. It has been claimed by several writers that the Baroness was morganatically allied to the Duke of Kent at a Roman Catholic church in Quebec.

For twenty-eight years Madame de St. Laurent presided over the Duke's household, as a local chronicler records, "with dignity and propriety." She is described as having been beautiful, clever, witty and accomplished. Many of her letters will be found in Anderson's " Life of the Duke of Kent " (Quebec: 1870). After the Duke's marriage in 1818 to the widow of the Prince of Leiningen, Madame de St. Laurent retired to a convent in Paris. She later married a Russian-Italian nobleman and eventually settled back in the Quebec City area at the summer home (built by Governor-General Sir Frederick Haldimand) she had shared with the Duke, which also still stands today.

== Occupants from 1802 to the present day ==
Judge Mabane died in 1792, his death being attributed to a cold he contracted while walking into town in a snowstorm, having lost his way on the Plains of Abraham. The property was sold by the Sheriff and adjudged to Miss Isabella Mabane, a sister of the judge, for the sum of £700.

Following the departure of Prince Edward, Duke of Kent and Strathearn from Canada in 1802, Miss Mabane leased the house to the Rt. Rev. Jacob Mountain, the first Anglican Bishop of Quebec. In 1809, for the sum of £1,300, Miss Mabane sold the property to her relative, Hon. John Craigie, a member of His Majesty's Executive Council of Quebec.

In 1816, Craigie sold it on for £3,000 to Pierre Brehaut, but he was not able to enjoy the property, dying the following year. His widow, Theresa Bellamy, sold it on to The Hon. Judge Olivier Perrault in 1819, who enlarged and extended the property into two houses. According to the deed of sale, the building still retained its ancient appearance and the space from the west gable of about eighteen feet, to Haldimand Street, was vacant ground. The house has retained its present exterior appearance since at least 1819.

After Judge Perrault's death in 1827, the property passed to his son-in-law, Hon. Elzéar-Henri Juchereau Duchesnay. Over the next hundred years, the property changed hands on many occasions, being owned in turn by John Jones; Dame Amelie Duchesnay, wife of Alexander Lindsay; an hotel keeper named O'Neil; Hon. Thomas McGreevy, Hon. Jean Thomas Taschereau and finally Joseph A. Gale.

In 1907, Gale gave the house a complete renovation, though keeping the walls and divisions intact. In 1927, he sold it to the brothers William Evan Price and David Edward Price of Quebec, who planned to level the property and replace it with a modern office structure for the firm of Price Brothers & Co. The plan was averted, and Price Brothers Building was forced further out of the city centre, but still within Old Quebec, which met with further remonstrations from the residents of Quebec. Today it serves as the French Consulate at Quebec.

== See also ==
- Royal eponyms in Canada
