= Antoine Juchereau Duchesnay =

Antoine Juchereau Duchesnay is the name of:

- Antoine Juchereau Duchesnay (seigneur) (1740–1806), seigneur and political figure in Lower Canada
- Antoine-Louis Juchereau Duchesnay (1767–1825), his son, seigneur and Lower Canada political figure
- Édouard-Louis-Antoine-Charles Juchereau Duchesnay (1809–1886), political figure in Canada East and member of the Senate of Canada
