= Eustache Chartier de Lotbinière =

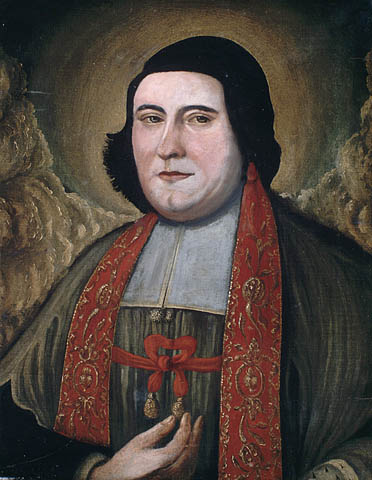

Councillor of the Sovereign Council of New France
- In office 1710–1749

Keeper of the Seals of New France
- In office 1717–1726

Dean of Notre-Dame Cathedral, Quebec
- In office 1738–1749
- Preceded by: Louis Bertrand de la Tour

Personal details
- Born: December 14, 1688 Maison Lotbinière, Québec City
- Died: February 14, 1749 (aged 60) Hôpital-Général de Québec
- Spouse: Marie-Françoise Renaud d’Avène des Meloizes
- Occupation: Seigneur de Lotbinière

Louis-Eustache Chartier de Lotbinière (French pronunciation: [lwi østaʃ ʃaʁtje də lɔtbinjɛʁ]; December 14, 1688 – February 12, 1749), Seigneur de Lotbinière; Member of the Sovereign Council of New France; Keeper of the Seals of New France; Vicar-General, Archdeacon and the first Canadian-born Dean of Notre-Dame Basilica-Cathedral, Quebec.

== Birth ==
Born at Maison Lotbinière, Quebec City, 14 December 1688. He was the son of René-Louis Chartier de Lotbinière and his wife Marie-Madeleine Lambert du Mont (1662–1695), daughter of Eustache Lambert du Mont (1618–1673), Seigneur and Commandant of the Quebec Militia. He was a first cousin of Pierre François de Rigaud, Marquis de Vaudreuil-Cavagnal, the last Governor General of New France, and the uncle of Louis-Philippe Mariauchau d'Esgly, 8th Bishop of Quebec. His own maternal uncle was married to the only daughter of Daniel de Remy de Courcelle, Governor General of New France.

== Early career ==
He was educated at the Jesuit's College, Quebec. With his two other brothers already in the church, his father desired for him to continue in the judicial positions that he and his father had held. In 1710, Louis XIV appointed him a Councillor of the Sovereign Council of New France. Six years later, the Intendant of New France, Michel Bégon de la Picardière, granted him the commission of Keeper of the Seals of New France, which was confirmed by the King in 1717.

Like his father, the authorities in France also held high hopes that he would go on to occupy the same posts that his father and grandfather had held before him. Within the Sovereign Council of New France he quickly distinguished himself by his competence, integrity and innate sense of justice, and temporarily served as Attorney General. In 1719, his cousin, Pierre François de Rigaud, Marquis de Vaudreuil-Cavagnal, put his name forward to be Chief Councillor of the Sovereign Council of New France, but the Intendant, Michel Bégon de la Picardière, withdrew his support as on more than one occasion de Lotbinière had opposed attempts to interfere with decrees which the intendant wanted to have changed. De Lotbinière did not get the promotion, and in 1722, his antagonism with Bégon was again evident when the intendant wrote of him that he "thinks that he knows as much as the most diligent. He is very fond of pleasure and not too fond of work".

He had inherited the Seigneury of Lotbinière, rendering fealty and homage in 1724, and he also held land in the Seigneury of Maure. In 1717, he had started the construction of a large stone church at Lotbinière, with the help of his brother, Father Valentin, who was the parish priest there. In 1722, he was appointed general agent at Quebec for the French Indies Company.

== The Church ==
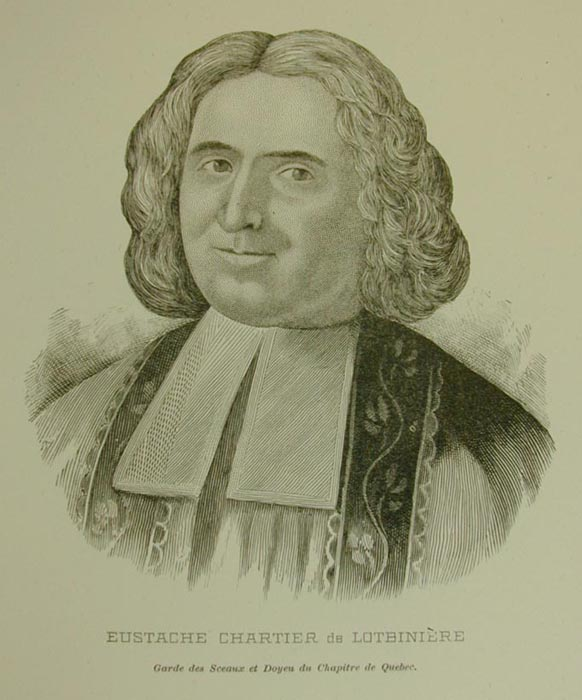
Eustache Chartier de Lotbinière

In 1723, his wife died on giving birth to their eighth child, the future Marquis de Lotbinière. This event prompted him to pursue a life in holy orders. In consequence of his already official duties, he learned theology through either his brother, Father Valentin, or Jean-Baptiste de La Croix de Chevrières de Saint-Vallier, who held Eustache in high esteem. He was ordained into the Priesthood (Catholic Church) in 1726, and only four days after this event the Bishop of Quebec appointed him Canon (priest) and Archdeacon, which was followed a few months later to his appointment as Vicar general to the Bishop. He resigned from the Indies Company, but Louis XV allowed him to retain his position on the Sovereign Council of New France as a lay councillor, on condition that he abstain from attending trials of criminal cases and relinquish his office as Keeper of the Seals.

== Family ==
In 1711, he married Marie-Françoise (1693–1723), daughter of Captain François-Marie Renaud d'Avène des Meloizes and Françoise-Thérèse (b.1670), daughter of Nicholas Dupont de Neuville (1632–1716). His wife's brother, Nicolas-Marie (1696–1743), married his sister, Angélique Chartier de Lotbinière (1692–1772), and their son inherited the Marquisate de Fresnoy. Eustache and Marie-Françoise de Lotbinière were survived by five children,

- Marie-Francoise Chartier de Lotbinière (1712-1776). In 1737, she married Antoine Juchereau Duchesnay (1704-1772), Chevalier de Saint-Louis, 5th Seigneur de Beauport etc., nephew of Louis Juchereau de Saint-Denys. They were the parents of The Hon. Antoine Juchereau Duchesnay.
- Louis-Eustache Chartier de Lotbiniere (1715-1786), Archdeacon of Quebec. Ordained in France at Angers, he returned to Quebec as a priest. In 1751, he donated a set of bells to the Church of Sainte-Anne-de-la-Pérade, Quebec.
- François-Louis Chartier de Lotbinière, Récollet priest and Knight of Malta.
- Marie-Louise Chartier de Lotbiniere (1718-1750), became a sister at the Hôtel-Dieu de Québec
- Michel Chartier de Lotbinière, Marquis de Lotbinière, married the daughter of Gaspard-Joseph Chaussegros de Léry (1682-1756)
