= Louis-Théandre Chartier de Lotbinière =

Louis-Théandre Chartier de Lotbinière (French pronunciation: [lwi teɑ̃dʁ ʃaʁtje də lɔtbinjɛʁ]; c. 1612 – c. 1688), considered by some sources to have been the 'Father of the Canadian Magistrature', was in fact the disreputable Lieutenant-General of the Provost's Court of New France. In 1667, he gave the first official Ball to be held in Canada, and he was the great-grandfather of the last Governor General of New France, Pierre François de Rigaud, Marquis de Vaudreuil-Cavagnal.

== Early life in France ==
Born at Paris c.1612, he was the son of René-Pierre Chartier de Lotbiniere (1572–1654), Counsellor in the French Parliament, Royal Professor of Medicine and Premier Medicin du Roi to Louis XIII. His mother, Françoise Bourcier (d.1631), was Lady-in-waiting to Henrietta Maria of France and the daughter of Louise Bourgeois Boursier. His family originated from Dijon in the fourteenth century, and he included amongst his ancestors Alain Chartier. The family were ennobled at the beginning of the fifteenth century, and his forebears married into such families as the Chateaubriands, Rochefoucaulds and Polignacs. According to tradition, one of the early Chartiers owned two estates near Dijon: Binière and Bignière. The manor at Binière was surrounded by a moat in which many lot fish swam, and so to differentiate between the two he called that one Lotbinière.

As a young man, Louis-Théandre Chartier de Lotbinière lived as the seigneur of Saint-Étienne de Monays, but soon made over this living to his brother, René (d.1655), who had lived in Canada between 1643 and 1647 as chaplain to the Ursulines of Quebec. At Paris, 1641, Louis-Théandre married Élisabeth d'Amours de Clignancourt (1613–1690), the daughter of Louis d'Amours de Louvieres (d.1640), Sieur de Serain, First Councillor to King Henry IV of France at the Grand Châtelet. Her brother, Mathieu d'Amours de Chauffours was a relative of Jean de Lauzon, the future governor of New France. Likely at the request of de Lauzon, with whom they made the journey (together with Mathieu d'Amours) Chartier and his family came to New France, arriving in Quebec, October 13, 1651.

== Official positions in New France ==
On his arrival in Quebec Lotbiniere was appointed Seigneurial Attorney to the Seneschal's Court at Quebec, and five years later was promoted to Lieutenant-General for Civil and Criminal Affairs. He kept this office until the autumn of 1663, when the Seneschal's Court was replaced by the Sovereign Council of New France. After the removal of Attorney-General Jean Bourdon and his allies in early 1664, despite the opposition of Bishop François de Laval, Lotbiniere was appointed Deputy Attorney General of the Sovereign Council of New France. When Bourdon was re-instated a few months later, Lotbiniere in turn resigned. Furious that Bourdon had been brought back, in the absence of Laval, Lauzon again dismissed Bourdon etc. and made Lotbiniere Attorney-General. Due to a more favourable position Lotbiniere resigned in 1666, and Bourdon was again re-instated.

The French West India Company, set up in 1664, had been authorized to “establish judges and officers wherever there will be need and wherever it will find it appropriate.” The company made use of this privilege to create a Provost's Court at Quebec (the Sovereign Council of New France was only called on in the case of an appeal), and in the spring of 1666 named Lotbiniere Lieutenant General for Civil and Criminal Affairs of the court. He remained in this position until 1677 when he resigned in his son's favour.

On May 27, 1671, the Ladies of the Hôtel-Dieu de Québec sold the former residence of Governor Louis d'Ailleboust de Coulonge to de Lotbiniere, which he immediately made his home. The residence, though much altered, is today the French Consulate in Quebec, and locally known as Duke of Kent House, Quebec. His son, René-Louis Chartier de Lotbinière, continued to live there with his family until his death in 1709. It was sold to the Maillou family, who leased it from 1743 to Louis-Theandre's great grandson, Michel Chartier de Lotbinière, Marquis de Lotbinière.

== Return to France and reputation ==
He had taken his stepmother to court over his inheritance which necessitated him to be in France in 1659 and 1677. In the autumn of 1679, he returned to France, never to return to the colony again. In 1680, Intendant Jacques Duchesneau de la Doussinière et d'Ambault wrote to the minister that Lotbiniere's daughter, Marie-Francoise, the widow of Pierre de Joybert de Soulanges et de Marson and the future mother-in-law of Philippe de Rigaud Vaudreuil, “has lost 1,000 livres which were granted to her last year, and a part of the 600 livres for the present year that her father the Sieur Chartier, to whom she had given powers of attorney, has consumed by his excesses, having continued to live in Paris.” This revelation reflects the character of the “erstwhile” Lieutenant-General of the Provost's Court. As a relative of Lauzon he had occupied important offices from the time he arrived in New France, but he never enjoyed the Jesuits’ esteem as much as the other settlers of his social standing. Neither did the clergy appear to have looked favourably upon the ball given by him on 4 February 1667, the “first ball in Canada,” (according to the Journal des Jésuites).

In 1676, Ange de Bouges, known as 'la Corruble', was arrested by order of the council, and imprisoned because of his scandalous conduct in the company of some young men. Lotbiniere had him released the following day, and when asked to give an explanation before the council, 'the Lieutenant-General refused to give his reasons, and furthermore his manner was peremptory and lacking in respect. Summoned to appear again, he maintained that he alone had the right to decide upon imprisonments. He resorted to an attitude of arrogance, and refused to justify his action any further. On 3 August the council relieved him of his office, which he resumed however before the end of the month.' (Dictionary of Canadian Biography).

An officer of justice for over thirty years, Jean Talon deemed Chartier de Lotbiniere as “ill suited to this profession”. He died in France in 1688, and was the father of two children, René-Louis Chartier de Lotbinière, and Louise-Elizabeth, who married Pierre de Joybert de Soulanges et de Marson.
