= François-Louis Chartier de Lotbinière =

François-Louis Chartier de Lotbinière (French pronunciation: [fʁɑ̃swa lwi ʃaʁtje də lɔtbinjɛʁ]; 1716 – in or after 1785), Knight of Malta, was a Recollet priest in Canada, the son of Eustache Chartier de Lotbinière by his wife Marie-Francoise, daughter of François-Marie Renaud d'Avène des Meloizes. He was the elder brother of Michel Chartier de Lotbinière, Marquis de Lotbinière.

Chartier de Lotbinière's career as a priest was marked by "drunkenness and dissoluteness". He was placed under a suspension from all church activities by Bishop Pontbriand around 1756. However, he was important to history in that he joined the rebel cause during the time of the Siege of Quebec. There were French-speaking Canadiens active on both sides of the conflict and he became chaplain to the Canadians fighting on the American side. This position was formalized by Benedict Arnold in 1776 and he accompanied his troops back to American soil when they withdrew from the siege.
