= Louise Élisabeth de Joybert =

Louise Élisabeth de Joybert (August 18, 1673 – January 1740) was a French marchioness, married to marquis Philippe de Rigaud Vaudreuil, governor of New France 1703–1725. She is reported to have had great influence during the tenure of her spouse, and to have used her influence to promote her friends and hinder the careers of her enemies.

Louise was the elder daughter of Pierre de Joybert de Soulanges et de Marson and his wife Marie-Françoise, who was a daughter of Louis-Théandre Chartier de Lotbinière, an official in the Provost's Court of New France who has been called "Father of the Canadian magistrature". Louise and her husband had ten children in all, one of whom was Pierre de Rigaud, Marquis de Vaudreuil-Cavagnial, the first native-born governor of New France.
