= Château Vaudreuil =

Stately residence and college in Quebec, Canada

Coordinates: 45°30′28″N 73°33′10″W

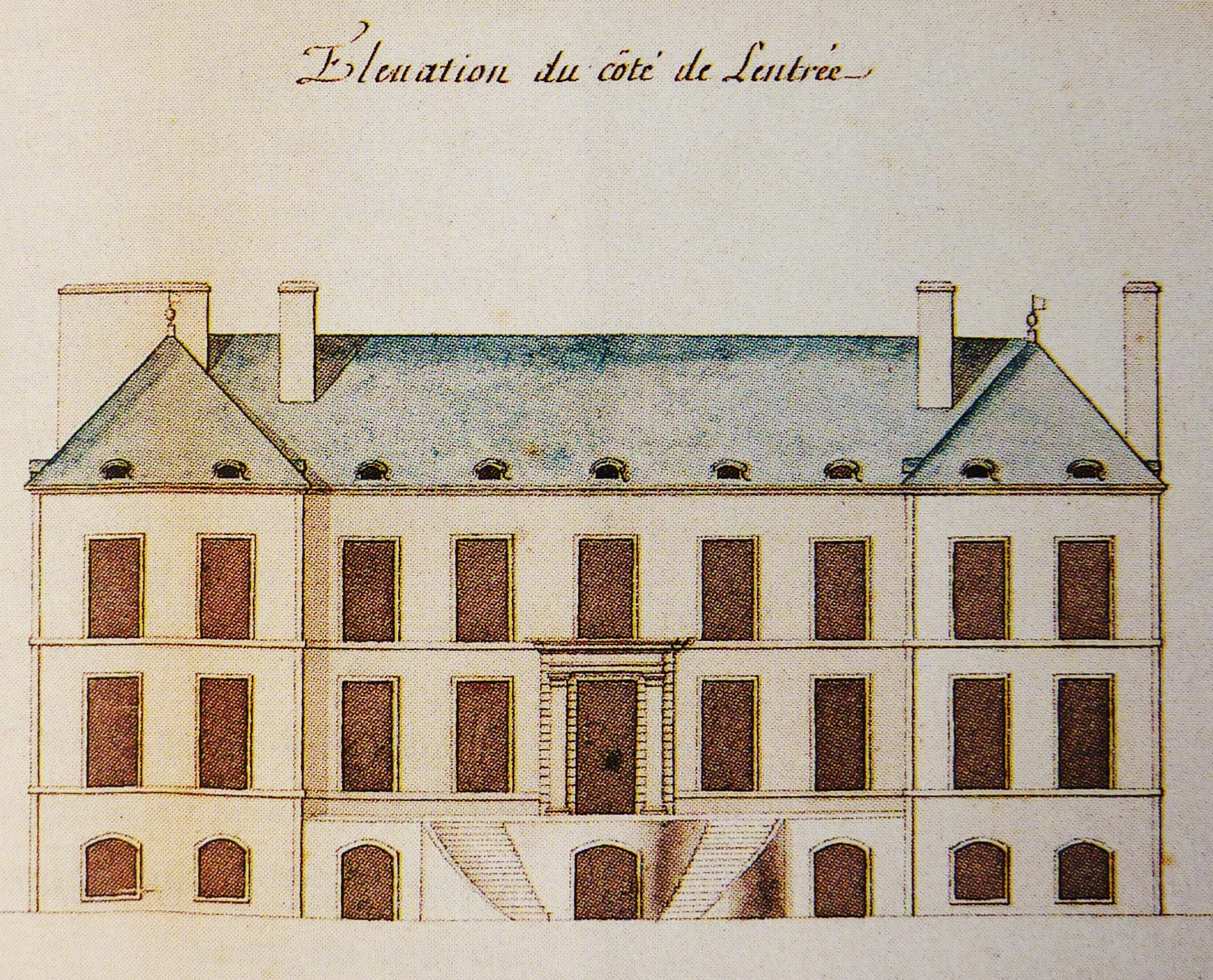
Château Vaudreuil, 1727 by Gaspard-Joseph Chaussegros de Léry

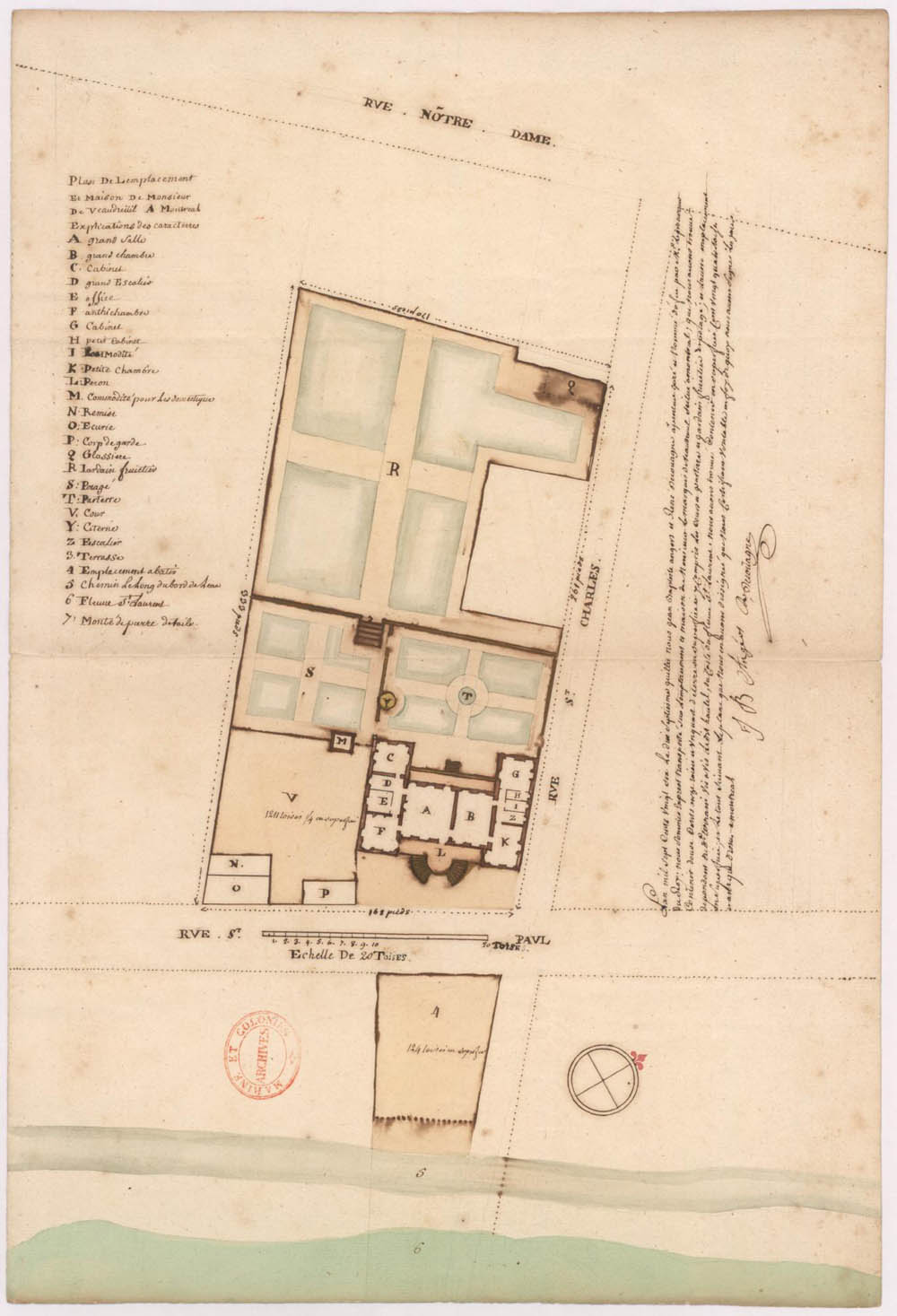
Plan by Jean-Baptiste Angers & René Decouagne, 1726

Château Vaudreuil (French pronunciation: [ʃato vodʁœj]) was a stately residence and college in Montreal, Quebec, Canada. It was constructed between 1723 and 1726 for Philippe de Rigaud, Marquis de Vaudreuil, as his private residence by Gaspard-Joseph Chaussegros de Léry. Though the Château Saint-Louis in Quebec City remained the official residence of the Governors General of New France, the Château Vaudreuil was to remain as their official home in Montreal up until the British Conquest in 1763. In 1767, it was purchased by the Marquis de Lotbinière. He sold it in 1773, when it became the Collège Saint-Raphaël. It was destroyed by a fire in 1803.

Completed in 1726, it was built in the classical style of the French Hôtel Particulier by King Louis XV's chief engineer in New France, Gaspard-Joseph Chaussegros de Léry. The central building was flanked by two wings with two sets of semi-circular stairs leading up to a terrace and the main entrance. It stood beyond the end of Rue Saint-Paul, which was kept clear of buildings on that side to afford it a clear view, while formal gardens led up to Notre-Dame Street.

Following the fire in 1803, a group of merchants, led by The Hon. Jean-Baptiste Durocher and The Hon. Joseph Périnault, purchased the land. On the condition that it would be used for public markets, they gave the government a small, oblong, strip of land (that had made up part of the formal gardens), which was first named New Market Place and from 1847 became known as Place Jacques-Cartier. This canny deal made by the merchants had the effect of increasing the value of the adjacent properties built around the 'square', which remained in private hands. In 1809, Nelson's Column was built by the citizens of Montreal in what had been part of the Château's formal gardens.

== See also ==
- Nelson's Column, Montreal
