= François-Marie Renaud d'Avène des Meloizes =

French Cavalry officer

Captain François-Marie Renaud d'Avène des Meloizes
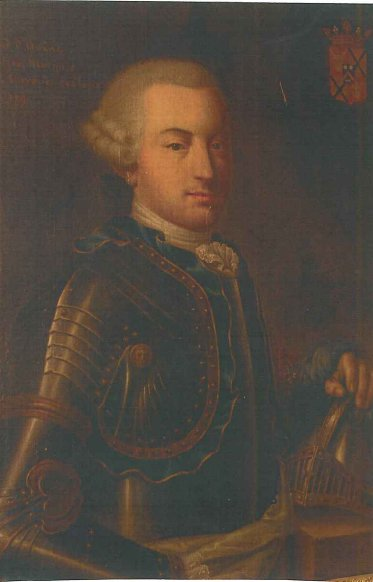
- Born: 1655 (Kingdom of France) Lormes, Nivernais
- Died: April 22, 1699 (aged 44) (New France) Quebec City

Captain François-Marie Renaud d'Avène des Méloizes (French pronunciation: [fʁɑ̃swa maʁi ʁəno davɛn de məlwaz]; 1655 – April 22, 1699) was a French Cavalry officer who came to New France in 1685 in command of the Troupes de Marine and led the successful expedition against the Senecas. The Comte de Frontenac considered him "one of the best and wisest officers" in Canada. He is buried in the vaults of Notre-Dame Basilica-Cathedral, Quebec City.

== Early life ==
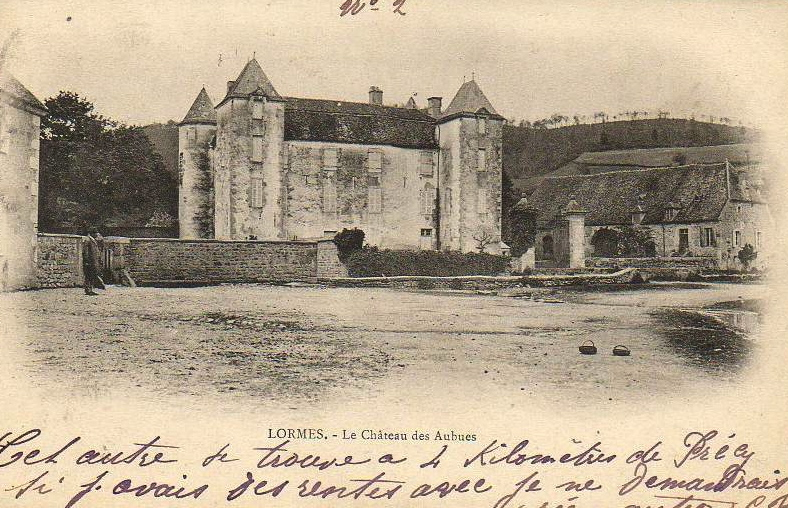
Château des Aubues, Lormes. Built circa 1423 by Guillaume de Montsaulnin

Born at Château des Aubues, Lormes, Bourgogne; the ancestral home of his mother's family since the early fifteenth century. He was the son of Edmé Renaud d’Avène, Seigneur des Méloizes et de Berges. His mother, Adrienne de Montsaulnin, was the daughter of Colonel Adrien de Montsaulnin of Château des Aubues; Seigneur de Montal, Aubues and Sancy; by his wife Gabrielle de Bussy-Rabutin of Château de Bussy-Rabutin; Dame de Chantal and Montal. Renaud was a first cousin of Louis de Montsaulnin (d.1686), 1st Marquis de Montsaulnin; and the uncle of General Louis de Montsaulnin (1688–1743), a godson of King Louis XIV and later Governor of Luxembourg etc.

== Military career ==
His uncle, Charles de Montsaulnin (1621–1696), was a close friend of Louis, Grand Condé and in 1668 Méloizes was commissioned into Condé's regiment. Four years later, he was a Standard-bearer in the Dragoons and the following year he held the same position in the Cavalry of the French Royal Army.

In 1685, he acquired a company in the Troupes de Marine and by August of that year he arrived with his regiment at Quebec. In 1687, he accompanied Jacques-René de Brisay de Denonville, Marquis de Denonville, on his expedition against the Senecas, and signed the document recording the taking of their country. Louis de Buade de Frontenac held him in high esteem, considering him to be "one of the best and wisest officers" in Canada. At the time of his marriage his wife's grandfather gave him the fief of La Cloutièrerie, within the Seigneury of Beauport, selling it in 1693. He also owned some property in the Upper Town of Quebec City. Renaud d’Avène des Méloizes died 22 April 1699 at Quebec and was buried in the vaults of the Notre-Dame Basilica-Cathedral.

== Family ==
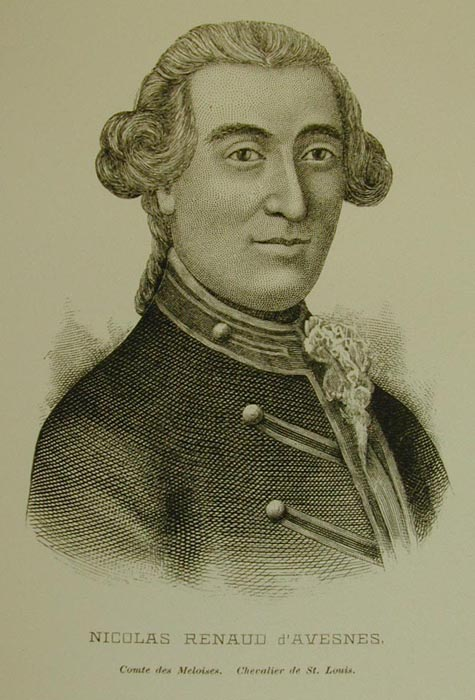
Nicolas-Marie Renaud d'Avène des Méloizes (1696–1743), Comte des Meloizes and Chevalier de St Louis

In May, 1687, at Quebec City, Renaud d’Avène des Méloizes married Françoise-Thérèse (1670–1698), daughter of Nicholas Dupont de Neuville (1632–1716), Seigneur de Neuville and member of the Sovereign Council of New France. They were the parents of nine children. Six survived them and they were brought up by their maternal grandparents after their parents died in 1698,

- Louise-Thérèse Renaud d’Avène des Méloizes (1690–1759), became La Soeur de la Sainte-Vierge at the Hôtel-Dieu de Québec.
- Marie-Thérèse Renaud d’Avène des Méloizes (1692–1711), became La Soeur de Saint-Gabriel at the Hôtel-Dieu de Québec.
- Marie-Françoise Renaud d'Avène des Meloizes (1693–1723). In 1711, at Quebec City, she married Eustache Chartier de Lotbinière. They were the parents of Michel Chartier de Lotbinière, 1st Marquis de Lotbinière.
- Marie-Jeanne Renaud d'Avène des Meloizes (1694–1766). Educated by the Ursulines of Quebec. In 1711, with a dowry of 10,000 Livres, her grandfather arranged for her to marry Jean-Francois Martin de Lino de Chalmette, Attorney General of New France. She refused the marriage and Chalmette instead married her uncle's sister (and later her aunt) Angelique Chariter de Lotbinière (1692–1772), the following year. Marie-Jeanne died unmarried at Quebec.
- Nicholas-Marie Renaud d'Avène des Meloizes (1696–1743), Comte des Meloizes and Chevalier de St Louis. In 1722, he married Angelique Chartier de Lotbinière (1692–1772), daughter of René-Louis Chartier de Lotbinière and the sister of his brother-in-law, Eustache. Their son, Nicolas Renaud d'Avene des Meloizes-Fresnoy (1729–1803), sold the Seigneury of Neuville for 45,000 Livres and moved to France where he became the Marquis de Fresnoy through his marriage to the heiress Agathe-Louise de Fresnoy, a descendant of Gaspard II de Coligny, at Château de Fresnoy. Their daughter, Angelique-Genevieve d'Avene des Meloizes (1722–1779) is the subject of Nadine Grelet's book, La Belle Angelique (2003) and one of the two central figures in The Golden Dog (1873). She was married to Michel-Jean-Hugues de Pean, but was better known for her affair with François Bigot.
- Catherine-Madeleine Renaud d'Avène des Meloizes (1697–1725), was a society beauty who appears in William Kirby's book, The Golden Dog with her niece, Angelique-Genevieve d'Avene des Meloizes. She died unmarried.
