= Angélique des Méloizes =

Canadian socialite

Angélique des Méloizes (French pronunciation: [ɑ̃ʒelik de melwaz]; December 11, 1722- December 1, 1792) was a Canadian socialite, and the politically influential mistress of François Bigot, Intendant of New France 1748-1760. She was the centre of high society in Quebec City.

The daughter of Nicolas-Marie Renaud d'Avène des Méloizes and she was the granddaughter François-Marie Renaud d'Avène des Meloizes. Her mother was Françoise-Thérèse Dupont de Neuville, she was born in Quebec City. Des Méloizes was married to the adjutant of that city, Michel-Jean-Hugues Péan. She is known for her love affair with François Bigot, Intendant of New France 1748-1760, and for the influence over politics attributed to her during his tenure, for which she has been compared to Madame de Pompadour. Alongside Péan, Bigot and Joseph-Michel Cadet, she was accused in France of having contributed to France's loss of Canada to Britain in 1760, during the Seven Years' War.

In their later years, the couple lived at Orzain near Blois in France. She died at Blois at age 69.
