= William Kirby (author) =

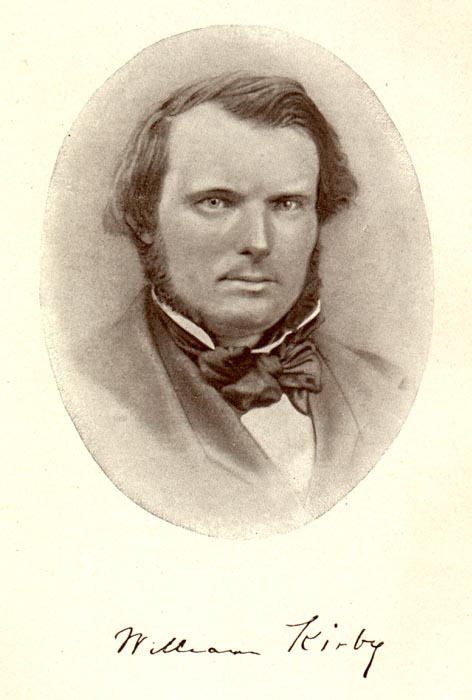
- Born: 13 October 1817; Yorkshire, England
- Died: 23 June 1906 (aged 88); Niagara
- Occupation: Writer
- Spouse: Eliza Madeline Whitmore
- Children: 3
- Writing career
- Notable work: The Golden Dog

William Kirby (13 October 1817 – 23 June 1906) was a Canadian author, best known for his classic historical novel, The Golden Dog.

== Life ==
Born in Yorkshire, England, Kirby immigrated with his parents to the United States in 1832, and then to Canada in 1839. After visiting Toronto, Montreal, and Quebec City, he settled in Niagara, Ontario, where his house still stands.

Kirby practised as a tanner until his marriage with Eliza Madeline Whitmore, with whom he had three children (one of whom died in infancy.) For more than twenty years, Kirby was the editor of the Niagara Mail (1850–1871) which he purchased from the founder in 1850. From 1871 to 1895, he was a collector of customs at Niagara, and in 1883, he became a charter member of the Royal Society of Canada. He died at Niagara on 23 June 1906.

Kirby's first full-length work was a long narrative, The U.E.: a tale of Upper Canada. Written in 1846 the poem spoke to his political views of the time. He was unsuccessful in his attempts to have it published until 1859, when he published it himself in the Niagara Mail.

== The Golden Dog ==
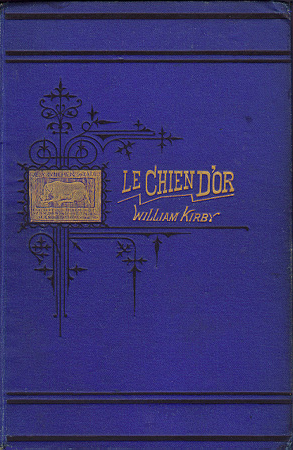
William Kirby, The Golden Dog, cover of the first edition (1877)

Kirby's importance as a Canadian writer rests largely on his novel The Golden Dog. Taking fifteen years to write, the historical romance was set in New France in 1748. Kirby finished writing the novel in 1873.

Although the first edition of the book was filled with errors, it was still very well received by the public and, to Kirby's delight, it was rumoured to have been read by Queen Victoria. The book was described as having both good characterisation and description used to describe rural and urban locations. It was heavily influenced by the collection Maple Leaves, by James LeMoine (7 vol. 1863–1906). This provided Kirby with the history, legends, and oral traditions needed to write his book.

The Golden Dog was initially published in English and distributed within the United States without his permission in 1877. Kirby's publisher Lovell, Adam Wesson and Company neglected to register the novel properly, so Kirby lost all royalties for his book. The copyright laws of the time stated all Canadian residents must register, publish, and distribute in Canada first, before distributing the book elsewhere, to secure copyright protection. The book was then picked up by New York publisher Richard Worthington, and re-issued in 1878, Kirby, once again, was neglected royalties.

In 1885, Kirby secured some rights when the French translation (Le Chien d'Or) was published. Copied versions of the story were, at this time, widely available, but unfortunately for Kirby, the translated version did not sell nearly as well.

Sometime later, Kirby was approached by L.C. Page and Company, a publishing company from Boston, with an offer of publishing a revised version of The Golden Dog. Kirby accepted this offer and revised the book, making corrections to the book in accordance with new developments in Quebec's history.

== Publications ==
- The U. E.: a tale of Upper Canada. (Niagara, 1859), a poem in Spenserian stanzas.
- The Golden Dog. (New York and Montreal, 1877)
- The Golden Dog. (Revised. Boston: L.C. Page, 1896)
- Memoirs of the Servos family. (Toronto, 1884)
- Canadian Idylls. (Welland, Ontario, 1894)
- Annals of Niagara. (Lundy's Lane Historical Society, 1896) (Stratford, ON: Macmillan, 1927)
