= Philippe de Rigaud, Marquis de Vaudreuil =

French politician (1643–1725)

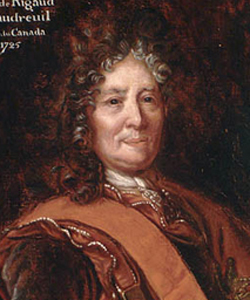
- Born: c. 1643; Vaudreuil, Revel, Haute-Garonne
- Died: 10 October 1725 (aged 81–82); Quebec, New France
- Spouse: Louise Élisabeth de Joybert
- Parent(s): Jean-Louis de Rigaud de Vaudreuil; Marie de Château-Verdun

Philippe de Rigaud, Marquis de Vaudreuil (French pronunciation: [filip də ʁigo maʁki də vodʁœj]; c. 1643 – 10 October 1725) was a French military officer who served as Governor General of New France (now Canada and U.S. states of the Mississippi Valley) from 1703 to 1725, throughout Queen Anne's War and Father Rale's War.

== Life and career ==
He was born at the Castle of Vaudreuil near Castelnaudary in France. He was the second son of Jean-Louis de Rigaud (d. 1659), Baron de Vaudreuil, Seigneur d'Auriac and de Cabanial, by his wife Marie de Château-Verdun. She was the daughter of François, Seigneur de la Razairie. As Chevalier de Vaudreuil, he was sent to command French forces in New France before being appointed Governor of Montreal in 1699, and then Governor General of New France in 1703. He died at Quebec City.

He married Louise Élisabeth de Joybert, a daughter of Pierre de Joybert de Soulanges et de Marson, by his wife Marie-Françoise, daughter of Louis-Théandre Chartier de Lotbinière. They lived at Château Vaudreuil, which was built in 1723 by Chaussegros de Léry, but was eventually destroyed by a fire in 1803. In 1723, he was recorded as owning an enslaved Meskwaki woman, Marguerite-Genevieve. Their son, Pierre François de Rigaud, Marquis de Vaudreuil-Cavagnal, served as the last Governor General of New France before the British Conquest of New France from 1755 to 1760 during the French and Indian War. Several of his other sons went on to distinguished careers in the French army and navy. His grandson Louis-Philippe de Vaudreuil defeated a British naval force at the Battle of the Chesapeake 1781 on the Sceptre, and was protecting George Washington's army in 1782 in Boston aboard the Triomphant. His grandson also brought the victorious French army of Rochambeau back to France after the Siege of Yorktown.

Rigaud de Vaudreuil was one of three governors-general of Canada known to have owned enslaved people. During his tenure, he owned 11 people, seven of whom were from First Nations and four from Africa.

== Legacy ==
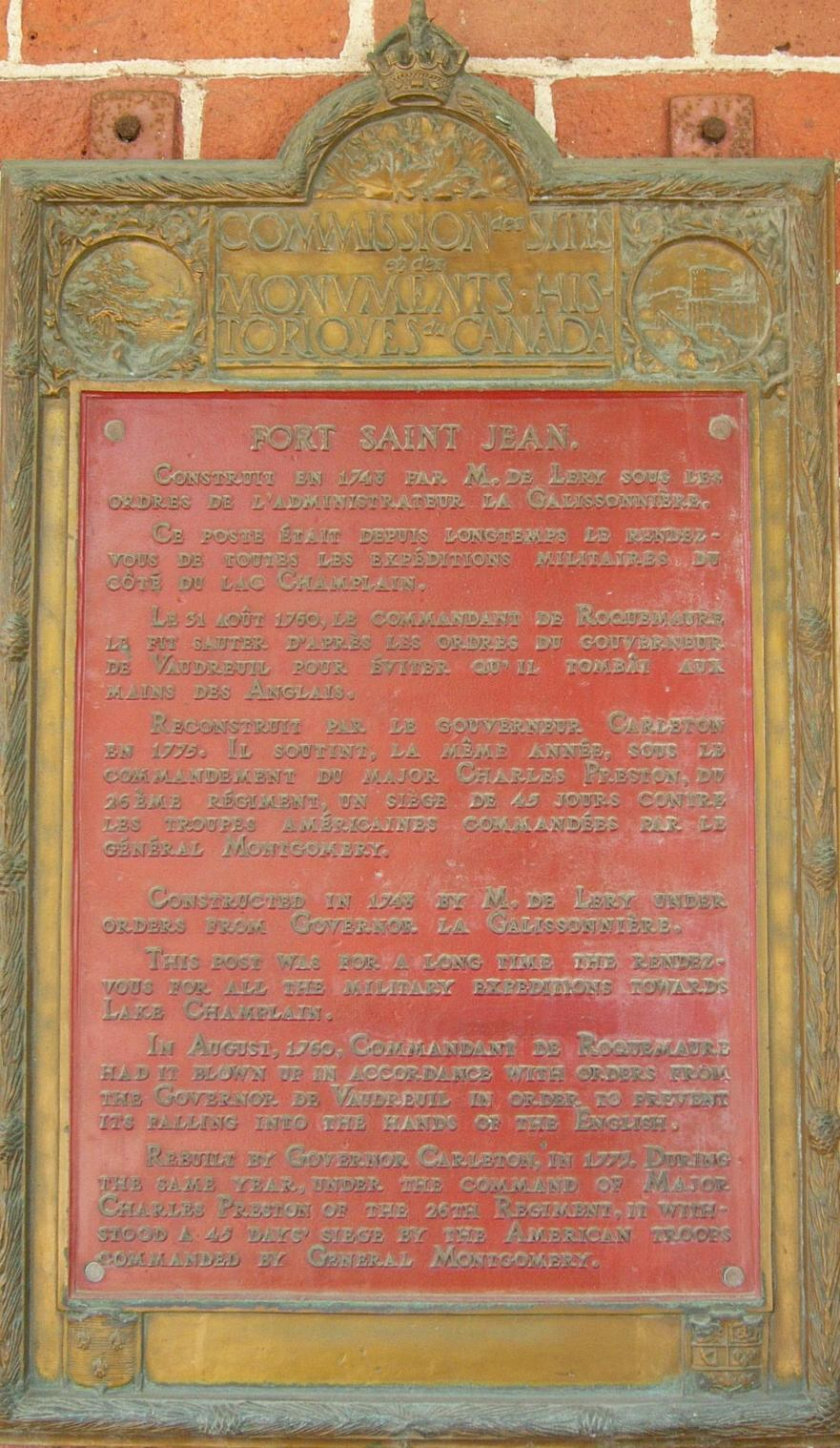
Historic plaque Fort-Saint-Jean 1926

Château Vaudreuil was constructed in 1723 as his private residence in Montreal. A Squadron of cadets at the Royal Military College Saint-Jean was named in his honour.

Vaudreuil is mentioned in a Fort Saint-Jean plaque erected in 1926 by Historic Sites and Monuments Board of Canada at the Royal Military College Saint-Jean. "Constructed in 1743 by M. de Léry under orders from Governor la Galissonnière. This post was for all the military expeditions towards Lake Champlain. On 31 August 1760, Commandant de Roquemaure had it blown up in accordance with orders from the Governor de Vaudreuil in order to prevent its falling into the hands of the English. Rebuilt by Governor Carleton, in 1773. During the same year, under the command of Major Charles Preston of the 26th Regiment, it withstood a 45-day siege by the American troops commanded by General Montgomery."

== Children ==
- Louis-Philippe (1691–1763), rear admiral, knight of the order of Saint-Louis.
- Jean (1695–1740), Mousquetaire
- Pierre (1698–1778), governor of Trois-Rivières (1733–1742), governor of French Louisiana (1743–1753), Governor-General of New France (1755–1760).
- François-Pierre (1703–1779), conquered Fort Massachusetts (1746), governor of Trois-Rivières (1749–1754), governor of Montréal (1757–1760).
- Joseph Hyacinthe (1706–1764), governor general of Saint-Domingue

== See also ==
- Canadian Hereditary Peers
- Jacques Baudry de Lamarche

Government offices
| Preceded by Hector de Callière | Governor General of New France; 1703 – 1725 | Succeeded by Charles de la Boische, Marquis de Beauharnois |
