= Gaspard-Joseph Chaussegros de Léry (1682–1756) =

Gaspard Chaussegros de Léry

Chief Engineer of New France
- In office 1719–1756
- Preceded by: Josué Boisberthelot de Beaucours
- Succeeded by: Nicolas Sarrebouce de Pontleroy

Personal details
- Born: October 3, 1682 Toulon, Provence, France
- Died: March 23, 1756 (aged 73) Québec City, New France
- Spouse: Marie-Renée Legardeur de Beauvais

Gaspard-Joseph Chaussegros de Léry (October 3, 1682 – March 23, 1756), was Louis XV's Chief Engineer of New France. He is recognised as the father of the first truly Canadian architecture. In 2006, the Historic Sites and Monuments Board of Canada designated him a person of national historic importance. It highlighted his contribution to the development of New France through the quality, variety, importance and scope of his work in the fields of military engineering, civil and religious architecture, and urban planning.

== Early life ==
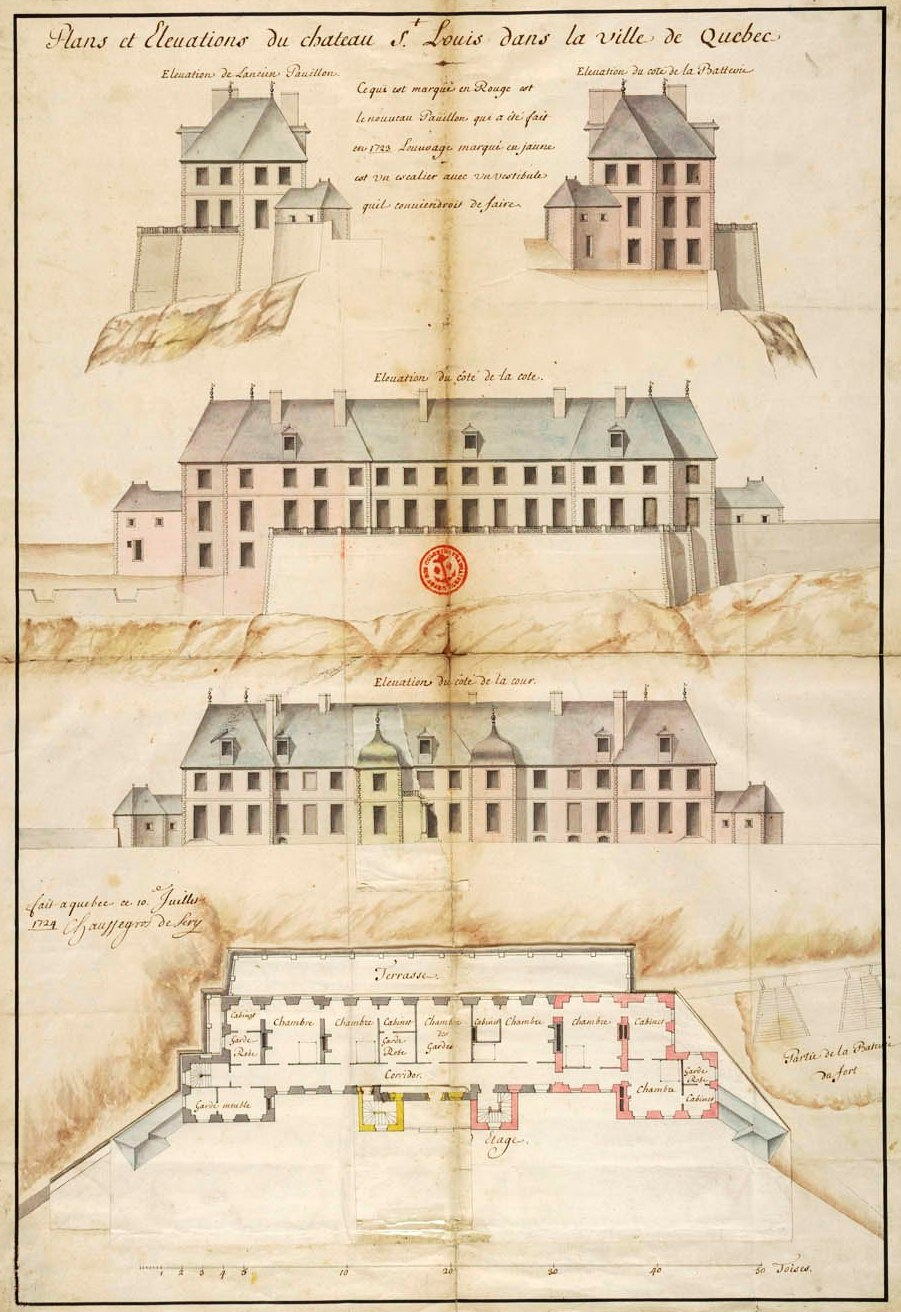
The Governor's Pavilion at the Château Saint-Louis, Quebec City, as designed by Léry, 1725

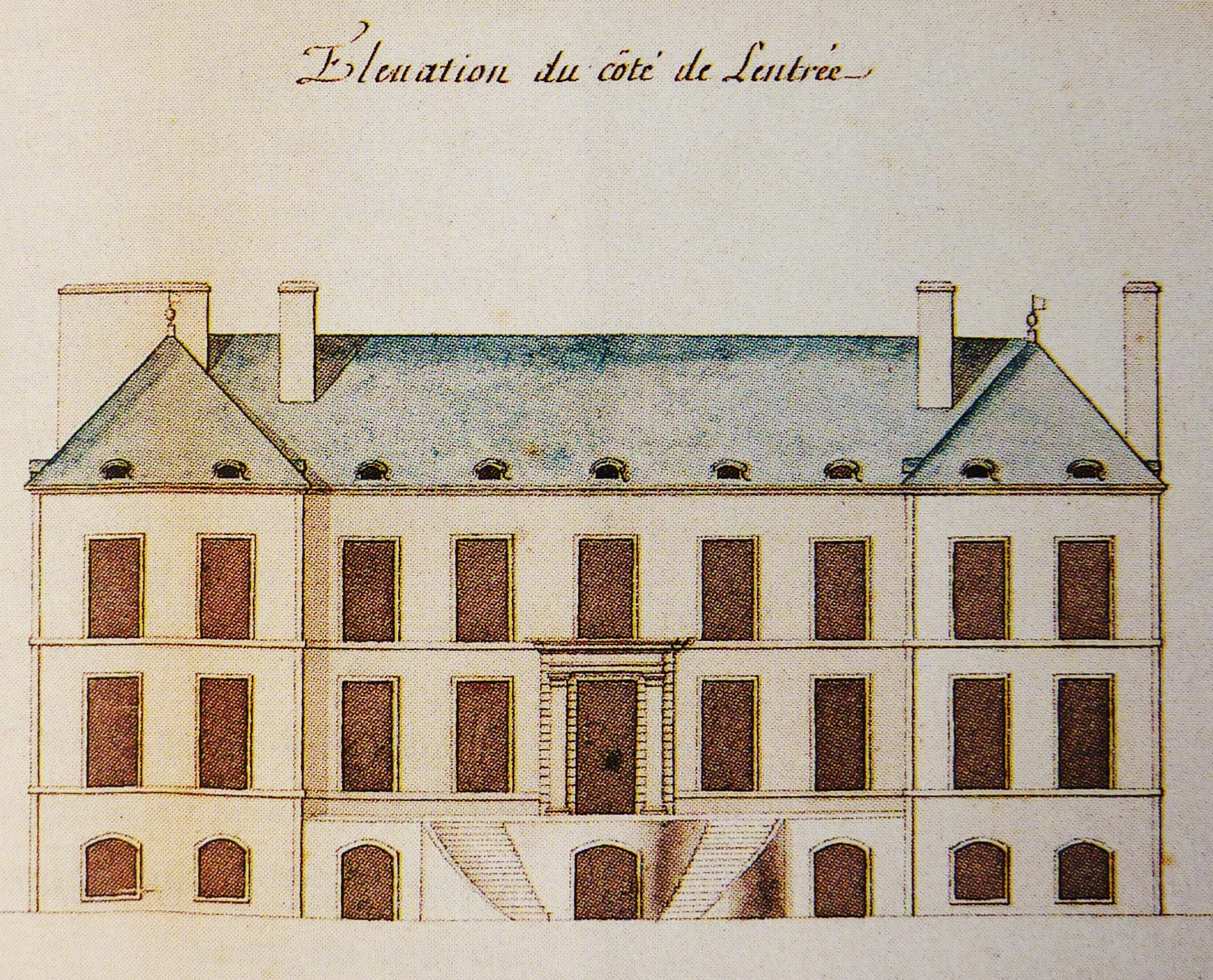
Château Vaudreuil, as drawn on its completion by de Léry, 1727

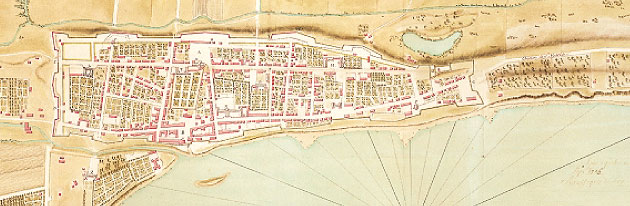
Plan of Montreal laid out by de Léry, 1731.

Baptised at Toulon Cathedral in 1682, he was the son of Gaspard d'Estienne de Chaussegros (d.1690), King's engineer and the architect of Toulon in Provence, by his first wife, Anne Vidal de Léry. His family were ennobled in 1325 and long settled in Provence, where their principal residence was the Château de Mimet, near Aix-en-Provence. Mimet was given away as a dowry in 1700 on the marriage of his aunt, Lucrèce d'Estienne de Chaussegros, to Charles II (1675-1741) de Grimaldi, Marquis de Régusse; President of the Parlement of Aix-en-Provence; grandson of Charles de Grimaldi-Régusse.

From his family papers kept at the National Archives of Canada, Chaussegros de Léry enjoyed the patronage of various high-ranking relatives of King Louis XV. Throughout his life he kept up a friendly personal correspondence with Philippe II, Duke of Orléans, Louis Alexandre, Count of Toulouse, and the Duc de Penthièvre, who all expressed their affection for him and his family and assured of him of their support. He was probably trained as a military engineer by his father, afterwards serving in an engineering capacity in the French Royal Army. He fought at the Battle of Turin as aide-de-camp to the Marquis de Vibraye. In 1708, he took part in the abortive attempt to land James, the Old Pretender, at Scotland. He was afterwards a captain in the Régiment de Sault.

In 1714, he completed a long manuscript, never published, entitled Traité de fortification divisé en huit livres. By 1716, he was employed within the Ministre de la Marine and sent to New France to prepare plans of the existing Fortifications at Quebec and to recommend those required to protect the city from attack. This mission led to a permanent appointment as King Louis XV's Chief Engineer there, a post he held from 1719 until his death.

== Chief Engineer ==
Chaussegros' achievements were subject to the will of Jean-Frédéric Phélypeaux, Count of Maurepas, at Versailles. The public works for which Chaussegros was responsible included the Fortifications of Quebec and Montreal; Fort Niagara, Fort Chambly, Fort Saint-Frédéric and Fort Sault-Saint-Louis; Château Vaudreuil at Montreal; The Governor's Pavilion of the Château Saint-Louis at Quebec; design of the façade of Notre-Dame Church at Montreal; repairs to the Bishop's Palace at Quebec; designs for a Palais de Justice at Trois-Rivières; following the Siege of Quebec, the Notre-Dame Basilica-Cathedral at Quebec was rebuilt from plans draughted by him in 1743; studies of a canal from Lachine to Montreal; consultation with respect to the Saint-Maurice Ironworks and the mines in the region of Baie-Saint-Paul; and plans for shipyards and drydocks on the Rivière Saint-Charles at Quebec.

== Family ==
In 1717, at Quebec, he married Marie-Renée, daughter of Captain René Le Gardeur de Beauvais (1660-1742), holder of the Grand Cross of the Order of Saint-Louis, and his first wife Marie-Barbe, daughter of Chevalier Pierre de Saint-Ours de L'Échaillon (1640-1724), Captain in the Carignan-Salières Regiment. Her family were originally from Thury-Harcourt and ennobled in 1510. In 1636, her ancestor Pierre Le Gardeur de Repentigny (1605-1648) established the family in New France, obtaining the seigneuries of Repentigny (named for the seigneury in Normandy of his maternal grandfather, Pierre de Corday de Repentigny) and Bécancour in 1647. Gaspard and Marie-Renée were the parents of nine children:

- Marie-Gertrude Chaussegros de Léry (1720-1721), died young
- Gaspard-Joseph Chaussegros de Léry (1721-1797). He was the father of François-Joseph, Vicomte de Léry who married a daughter of Général François Christophe de Kellermann, 1st Duc de Valmy and Marshal of France; The Hon. Louis-René Chaussegros de Léry; The Hon. Charles-Étienne Chaussegros de Léry; and Catherine, the wife of Jacques-Philippe Saveuse de Beaujeu and mother of Georges-René Saveuse de Beaujeu.
- René-Antoine Chaussegros de Léry (1722-1722), died young.
- Marie-Madeleine-Régis Chaussegros de Léry (1723-1784), married her cousin Colonel Louis Le Gardeur de Repentigny (1721-1786), Governor of Senegal.
- Marie-Jeanne-Geneviève Chaussegros de Léry (1725-1730), died young
- Louise-Madeleine Chaussegros de Léry (1726-1809), married Michel Chartier de Lotbinière, Marquis de Lotbinière. They were the parents of Michel-Eustache-Gaspard-Alain Chartier de Lotbinière, de jure 2nd Marquis de Lotbinière.
- Charles Chaussegros de Léry (b.1728), lieutenant in the Infantry, was killed at Kourou in French Guiana sometime after 1767.
- Josèphe-Antoinette Chaussegros de Léry (b.1729)
- Marie-Gilles Chaussegros de Léry (1732-1803). At France in 1761, she married Jean-Marie Landrièves des Bordes (1712-1778), of Château d'Artanes; Chief King's Scrivener and Commissary of the Marine. Her dowry was 12,000 livres while his fortune was reported to be 900,000 livres

== See also ==
- Château Vaudreuil
- Canadian peers and baronets
