= The Golden Dog =

Novel by William Kirby

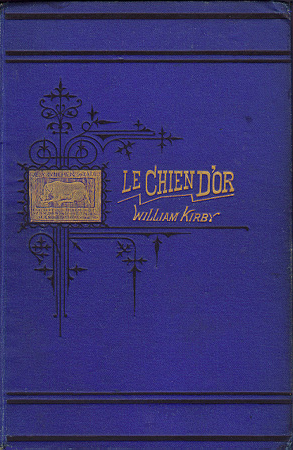
William Kirby, Le Chien d'Or / The Golden Dog, Front page of the first edition, 1877.

The Golden Dog (Le Chien d'Or) was a novel by William Kirby (1817–1906) that was written between April 1869 and 1872, with further revisions being up through 1876. After being rejected by several publishers, the work was finally arranged to be published in 1877 by Lovell, Adam, Wesson and Company. However, because the publisher neglected to register the novel, the author lost any royalties to this work. He received a sum total of $100–200 for the publication.

This novel is based upon three works by James MacPherson Le Moine: The Golden Dog, Château Bigot and La Corriveau. It draws upon the historical background of the city of Quebec for its characters, and tells its story through two intertwining plot lines. The first is of the lady Angélique de Méloizes, Madame De Péan, while the second is of Colonel Pierre Philibert, the son of a prosperous merchant.

The novel was published in an abridged version by McClelland and Stewart Limited in 1969 as number 65 of The New Canadian Library. It was abridged by Derek Crawley.
