= Pierre de Joybert de Soulanges et de Marson =

Canadian politician

Pierre de Joybert de Soulanges et de Marson (c. 1641 – 1678) was the administrator of Acadia in 1677–1678.

He was born at Saint-Hilaire de Soulanges in the Province of Champagne, France. He was the son of Claude de Joybert, Seigneur de Soulanges. As a young man he served in Portugal before coming to Quebec in 1665 as a Lieutenant in the Carignan-Salières Regiment. He was attached to Hector d'Andigné de Grandfontaine’s company and was part of the Prouville de Tracy’s expedition that was launched against the Iroquois in 1666. He returned to France after the raids but came back to North America in 1670.

Joybert was sent to secure various posts in Acadia. He accepted the surrender of Jemseg on the Saint John River, Port-Royal and Fort La Tour at Cap de Sable. In 1672, he married Marie-Françoise, daughter of the attorney-general of New France, Louis-Théandre Chartier de Lotbinière, at Quebec. Their daughter, Louise Élisabeth de Joybert, married Philippe de Rigaud Vaudreuil, Governor of Montreal and New France.
