= Pierre de Rigaud, marquis de Vaudreuil-Cavagnial =

French military officer and colonial administrator

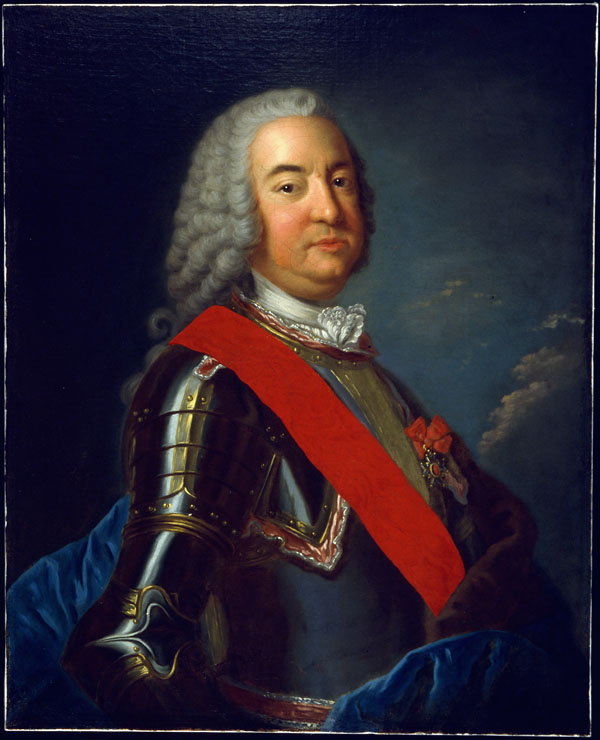
- c. 1754 portrait of Vaudreuil attributed to Donat Nonnotte

13th Governor General of New France
- In office 1755–1760
- Monarch: Louis XV
- Preceded by: Marquis Du Quesne
- Succeeded by: Jeffery Amherst as Governor of the Province of Quebec

10th French Governor of Louisiana
- In office 1743–1753
- Monarch: Louis XV
- Preceded by: Jean-Baptiste Le Moyne
- Succeeded by: Louis Billouart de Kerlérec

21st Governor of Trois-Rivières
- In office 1733–1742
- Monarch: Louis XV
- Preceded by: Josué Dubois Berthelot de Beaucours
- Succeeded by: Claude-Michel Bégon de la Cour

Personal details
- Born: Pierre de Rigaud de Vaudreuil de Cavagnial; November 22, 1698 Quebec, New France, France
- Died: August 4, 1778 (aged 79) Paris, France
- Spouse: Jeanne Charlotte de Fleury Deschambault (m. 1746; died 1763)

Military service
- Allegiance: Kingdom of France
- Branch/service: French Navy
- Years of service: 1708–1761
- Rank: Captain
- Battles/wars: French and Indian War
- Awards: Order of Saint Louis; Grand-Croix

Pierre de Rigaud de Vaudreuil de Cavagnial, marquis de Vaudreuil (French pronunciation: [pjɛʁ də ʁiɡo də vodʁœj də kavaɲal]; 22 November 1698 – 4 August 1778) was a French military officer and colonial administrator. Born in Quebec, he was governor of French Louisiana (1743–1753) and in 1755 became the last Governor-General of New France. In 1759 and 1760 the British conquered the colony in the Seven Years' War (known in the United States as the French and Indian War).

== Life and work ==
Coat of Arms of Pierre de Rigaud, Marquis de Vaudreuil-Cavagnial

He was born to the Governor-General of New France, Philippe de Rigaud Vaudreuil and his wife, Louise-Élisabeth, the daughter of Pierre de Joybert de Soulanges et de Marson, in Quebec. He was the uncle of Louis-Philippe de Vaudreuil. Commissioned into the French Royal Army while still a youth, in 1730, he was awarded the Cross of St. Louis. In 1733 he was appointed governor of Trois-Rivières, and in 1742 of French Louisiana, serving there from to May 10, 1743, to February 9, 1753, and proving himself a skilled officer and capable administrator. While governor of Louisiana, he married Jeanne-Charlotte de Fleury Deschambault, a widow about 15 years his elder.

He moved to France in 1753 before being appointed by King Louis XV as governor of New France in 1755. Although Vaudreuil held supreme civil authority in Canada and was technically commander-in-chief of all French forces there, he clashed often with Montcalm, the military commander in the field, who resented his oversight role. The two men grew to detest one another, much to the detriment of the French war effort. After Montcalm was defeated by British forces under Major-general James Wolfe at Quebec City in the Battle of the Plains of Abraham, Vaudreuil tried to rally resistance to the invaders but to no avail. He was forced to surrender Montreal on 8 September 1760 to Major-general Jeffrey Amherst.

One of several scapegoats for France's losses in the New World, Vaudreuil was imprisoned in the Bastille on March 30, 1762, but was released on May 18. He was joined by Bigot, Cadet, Pean, Breard, Varin, Le Mercier, Penisseault, Maurin, Copron, and others. Of the 21 men brought to trial, 10 were condemned, six were acquitted, three received an admonition and two were dismissed for want of evidence. Absent were 34, of whom seven were sentenced in default, and judgement was reserved in the case of the rest. Exonerated in a military tribunal held in December 1763, he was awarded a pension and military decoration. After selling his Canadian seigneuries at Vaudreuil and Rigaud to his cousin, Michel Chartier de Lotbinière, Marquis de Lotbinière, he retired to his ancestral estate near Rouen, although the episode ruined his fortunes. He died in Paris on 4 August 1778.

His nephew Louis-Philippe de Vaudreuil was the second in command of the French naval units supporting the Americans during the American Revolution. He was present at the crucial French victory over the Royal Navy at the Battle of the Chesapeake during the siege of Yorktown in 1781, although he was later defeated by the British navy at the Battle of the Saintes. Vaudreuil was one of three governors-general of Canada known to have owned enslaved people. During his tenure, he owned 16 people, 13 of whom were Africans.

== Legacy ==
=== In Literature ===
Vaudreuil is a menacing offstage presence in Kenneth Roberts' Arundel novels, Arundel and Rabble in Arms.

== See also ==
- Canadian Hereditary Peers
- Articles of Capitulation of Montreal
- Timeline of Quebec history
- Philippe de Rigaud Vaudreuil
- Louis-Philippe de Vaudreuil
- Joseph Hyacinthe François de Paule de Rigaud, Comte de Vaudreuil

== Notes ==
Government offices
Preceded by Jean-Baptiste le Moyne de Bienville	French Governor of Louisiana; 1743–1753	Succeeded by Louis Billouart, Chevalier de Kerlerec
Preceded by Ange Duquesne de Menneville, Marquis Duquesne	Governor General of New France; 1755–1760	Succeeded by Jeffery Amherst, 1st Baron Amherst as Governor General of British North America
