= Antoine-Louis Juchereau Duchesnay =

Canadian politician (1767–1825)

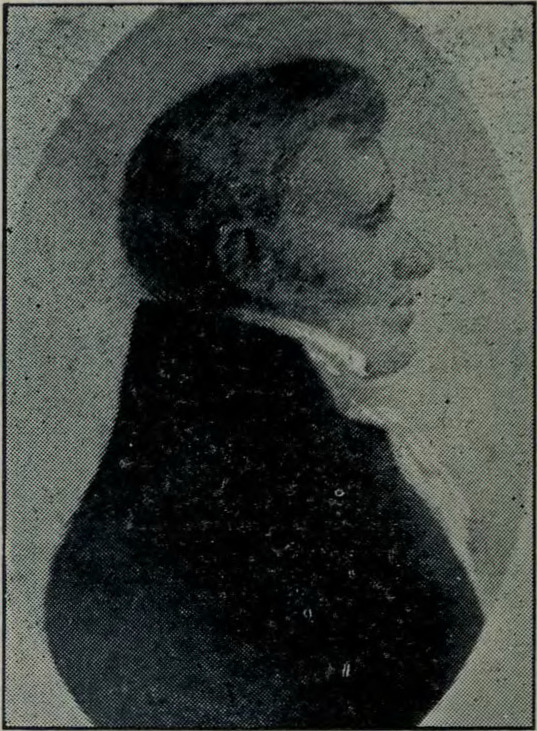
- Born: 18 February 1767; Quebec City
- Died: 17 February 1825; Beauport
- Occupation: Politician
- Children: Elzéar-Henri Juchereau Duchesnay, Antoine-Narcisse Juchereau Duchesnay, Charles-Maurice Juchereau Duchesnay
- Father: Antoine Juchereau Duchesnay
- Relatives: Michel-Louis Juchereau Duchesnay

Antoine-Louis Juchereau Duchesnay (French pronunciation: [ɑ̃twan lwi ʒyʃʁo dyʃɛnɛ]; February 18, 1767 – February 17, 1825) was a seigneur, soldier and political figure in Lower Canada.

He was born at Quebec City in 1765, the son of Antoine Juchereau Duchesnay, and studied at the Petit Séminaire de Québec. He served as lieutenant in the Royal Canadian Volunteer Regiment from 1798 to 1802. Juchereau Duchesnay was elected to the Legislative Assembly of Lower Canada for Hampshire in 1804; he represented the county until 1810 when he was named to the Legislative Council. He inherited the seigneury of Beauport from his father in 1806. In 1809, he became assistant to the adjutant general for the Lower Canada militia. He was named justice of the peace in 1813 and commander of the Beauport militia in 1816. In 1817, he was named to the Executive Council; he had been an honorary member since 1812. In 1821, Juchereau Duchesnay was named to the board of trustees for the Royal Institution for the Advancement of Learning. He opposed an 1822 plan to unite Upper and Lower Canada.

He died at Beauport in 1825.

His son Elzéar-Henri later served in the Canadian Senate. His nephew Édouard-Louis-Antoine-Charles Juchereau Duchesnay also served in the Senate. His daughter Louise-Sophie married Bartholomew Conrad Augustus Gugy, who later served in the legislative assembly for the Province of Canada. His half-brother Jean-Baptiste served as a member of the legislative council.
