= Michel Chartier de Lotbinière, Marquis de Lotbinière =

French military engineer (1723–1798)

Michel, Marquis de Lotbinière
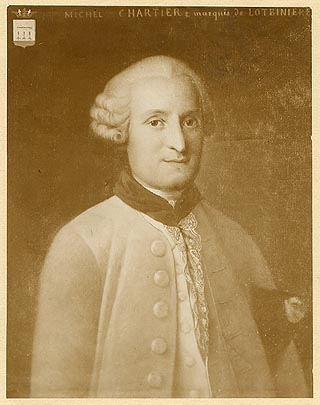
- Born: 23 April 1723; Quebec City
- Died: 14 October 1798 (aged 75); New York City

Michel-Alain Chartier de Lotbinière, 1st Marquis de Lotbinière (French pronunciation: [miʃɛl ʃaʁtje də lɔtbinjɛʁ]; 1723–1798) was a French Canadian military officer who was Seigneur of Vaudreuil, Lotbinière and Rigaud, Quebec. In 1757, on his advice at the Siege of Fort William Henry, the Marquis de Montcalm successfully attacked Fort William Henry. In 1758, Lotbinière again advised Montcalm to await rather than attack the British Army, at Fort Carillon, the fort that Lotbinière had built, which led to the French victory at the Battle of Carillon. In 1784, Louis XVI created Lotbinière a Marquis, the only Canadian by family and birth to have attained that rank, and the last such creation made by Louis XVI. He was the last private owner of Château Vaudreuil in Montreal.

== Early life ==
Michel-Alain Chartier de Lotbinière was born in 1723 at Quebec, the youngest son of Eustache Chartier de Lotbinière. His mother, Marie-Francoise (1695–1723), was the daughter of Captain François-Marie Renaud d'Avène des Meloizes and Françoise-Thérèse (1670-1698), daughter of Nicholas Dupont de Neuville (1632–1716).

His career was greatly aided by two of his close relations, both of whom were Governors General of New France - Roland-Michel Barrin de La Galissonière and Pierre de Rigaud, Marquis de Vaudreuil-Cavagnial. He was the brother of François-Louis Chartier de Lotbinière and their first cousins included Louis-Philippe Mariauchau d'Esgly, La Belle Angelique-Genevieve d'Avene des Meloizes (mistress of François Bigot) and Nicolas Renaud d'Avene des Meloizes, Marquis de Fresnoy. He was the uncle of The Hon. Antoine Juchereau Duchesnay.

== Military engineer ==
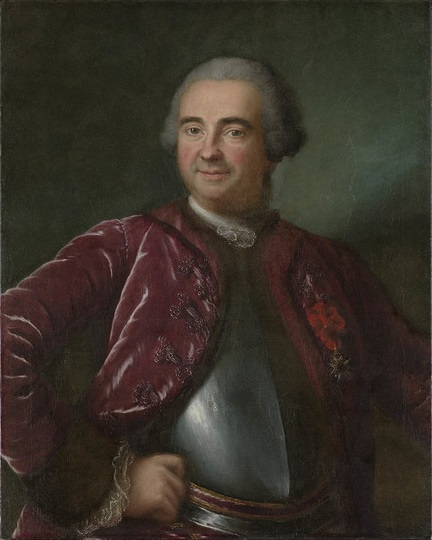
Lotbinière's father-in-law, Gaspard-Joseph Chaussegros de Léry, the Chief Engineer of New France from 1719 to 1756

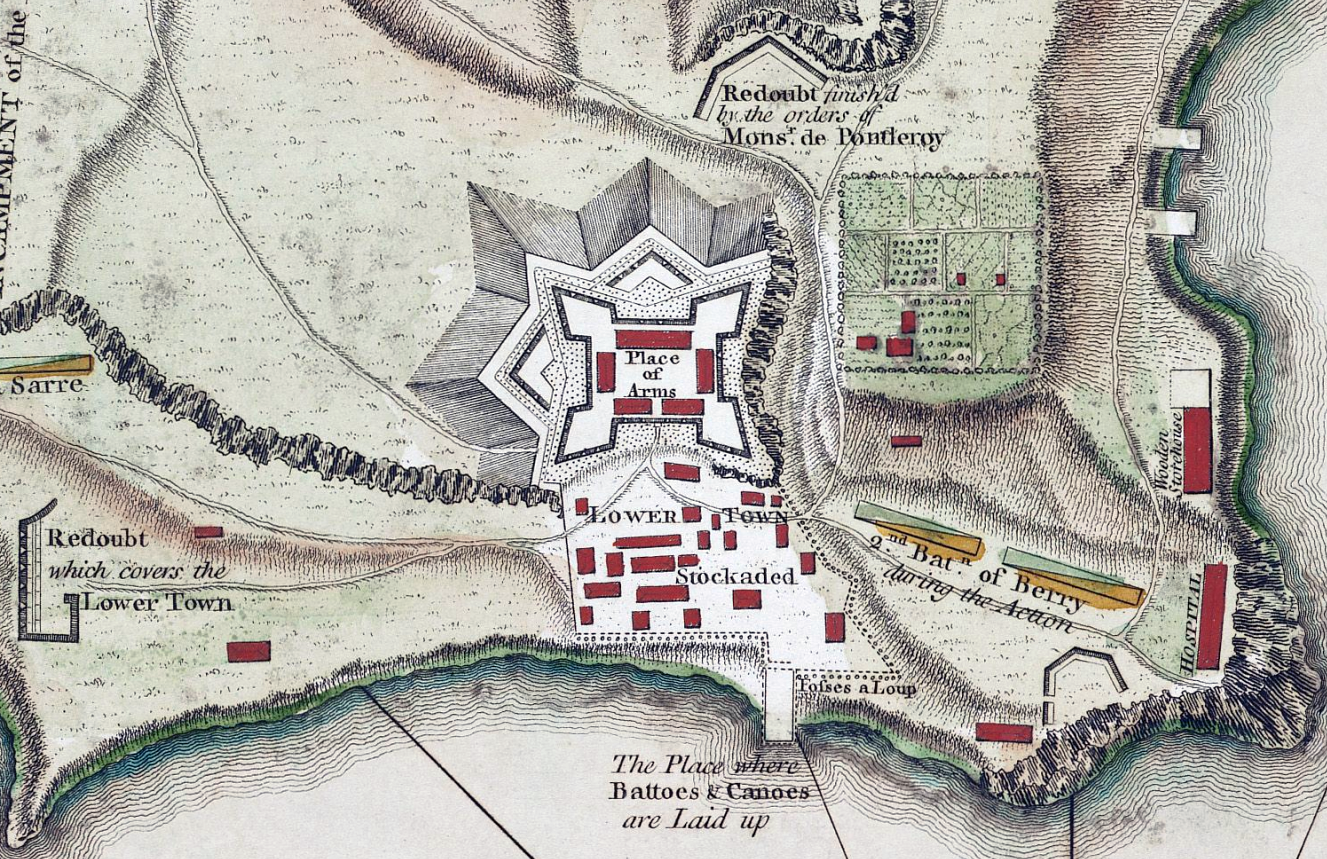
Detail of a 1758 map showing the layout of Fort Carillon as designed by Lotbiniere

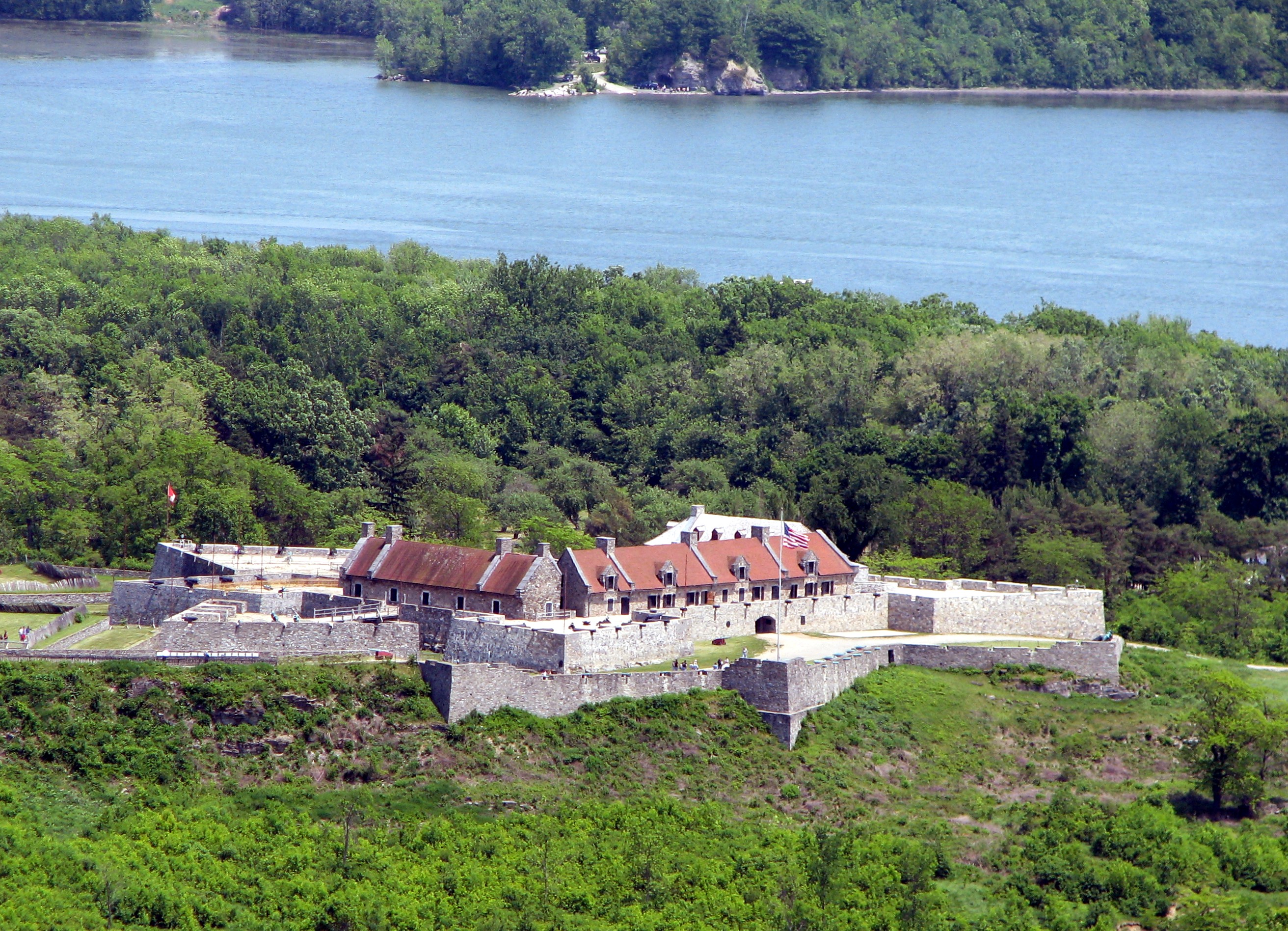
Fort Ticonderoga, designed by Lotbiniere

Michel was brought up at the Jesuit College in Quebec before becoming a cadet with the colonial troupes de la marine, breaking family tradition by being the first not to preside over the Sovereign Council of New France. As second ensign he served in the Defence of the Acadians of 1746-47 gaining a reputation as "a capable and courageous officer". In 1747, Lotbinière married Louise-Madeleine Chaussegros de Léry, the daughter of Gaspard-Joseph Chaussegros de Léry (1682-1756), chief engineer of New France, and his wife Marie-Renée Legardeur de Beauvais. In 1749, his relation, the Commandant General of New France, Roland-Michel Barrin de La Galissonière, promoted him to ensign and entrusted him to lead a reconnaissance mission into the region between Montreal and Michilimackinac.

Completing his mission successfully, in 1750 Galissonière (who was now back in France), sent for the young Lotbinière to join him so he could train as an engineer and artillery officer. Three years later he returned to New France as a Lieutenant and with the title of King's Engineer in the Colonial Regular Army, working under his father-in-law on the construction of the Ramparts of Quebec City.

In 1755, his cousin, Pierre Francois de Rigaud, Marquis de Vaudreuil-Cavagnal, put him in charge of building a fortress at the southern end of Lake Champlain. He spent several years there overseeing the construction of Fort Carillon (as it was called until the British captured it in the Battle of Ticonderoga in 1759 and renamed it Fort Ticonderoga). Although promoted to captain in 1757, he was refused the position of chief engineer (which he is often referred to as having been) of New France, a position which he had asked for after his father-in-law's death. The court instead appointed Nicolas Sarrebouce, an engineer in the French Army, who wasted no time in hindering Lotbinière's career, sending reports to Paris accusing him of incompetence and malfeasance, ruining his credibility with the Ministry of Marine. As some form of compensation his cousin, Governor-General Vaudreuil, gave him the seigneury of Alainville.

In the run up to the Battle of Quebec his cousin, Vaudreuil, employed him to build defences about the city, and during the battle he served as his aide-de-camp. In 1760 he was put in charge of fortifying Ile aux Noix to impede the British advance from the south, but was forced to fall back to Montreal, Quebec. Another of his first cousins, Nicolas Renaud d'Avene des Meloizes-Fresnoy (1729-1803), Marquis de Fresnoy, served as major-general in the French victory at the Battle of Sainte-Foy, for which he was rewarded the Grand Cross Order of Saint Louis. After the capitulation, Lotbiniere left his wife and newly born daughter in Canada and returned to France with his 12-year-old son, cadet Michel-Eustache-Gaspard-Alain Chartier de Lotbinière.

== Seigneuries ==
Having lost his land in America, that had amounted to 150,000 acres, he unsuccessfully tried to resume his military career in France. His thoughts turned again to his native land, and he decided to return as a large landowner. From his cousin, former Governor Marquis de Vaudreuil who had retired to his ancestral estate near Rouen, he bought in 1763 the seigneuries of Vaudreuil, Rigaud and Saint-François-de-Nouvelle-Beauce, also adding Villechauve (known today as Beauharnois) and Hocquart to his existing seigneuries at Lotbinière (granted to his grandfather in 1672) and Alainville. Before returning to Canada he spent a year in London to try to make sure that Alainville and Hocquart (which since the Royal Proclamation of 1763 fell within the boundaries of the Province of New York) would be recognized as his by the British Board of Trade. This resulted in a vague promise, which Lotbinière took as a guarantee.

On his return to Canada in 1760, Lotbinière immediately set about developing his seigneury at Vaudreuil. He built a manor house there for his family, a mill, and the Church of Saint-Michel de Vaudreuil, which still stands today, and where many members of his family are buried with memorials. Vaudreuil is closely associated with his many descendants, notably the de Lotbiniere-Harwood family, who inherited the seigneury of Vaudreuil.

In 1767, he purchased the Château Vaudreuil at Montreal, Quebec. Short of funds he was forced to sell the seigneury of Lotbinière to his son in 1770. By 1771 his son had bought all his father's Canadian seigneuries except Villechauve, which was mortgaged. In addition to this, he was unable to recover his two properties in New York (Alainville and Hocquart), and so returned to London to again plead his cause. In 1773, he sold the Château. In 1776, the British Board of Trade rejected his claims to Alainville and offered him a grant of an equal size of land in Quebec in compensation for his loss of Hocquart. He refused the compromise and left Britain, deciding to be a British subject no longer.

== Agitating in Boston and France ==
Taking the advice of his former superior officer, François de Gaston, Chevalier de Levis, he went to France and offered his services to the Minister of Foreign Affairs, Charles Gravier, Comte de Vergennes who entrusted him with an unofficial mission as an observer. In 1776 he arrived in Massachusetts, but ignoring Vergenne's words immediately introduced himself to John Hancock as the unofficial envoy of the minister. He spent six months in Boston, and though a personal friend of Benjamin Franklin, he won few friends through his agitations. Lotbinière, for purely selfish reasons, was desperate for France to recover her lost colonies, and did all he could to force the issue. He returned to France with his report in 1777, but Vergennes didn't see it as wise to send him on any further missions. Up until 1782 he still hoped France would recover her lost territories in North America, but after the Treaty of Paris in 1783 any last hopes he had had of returning to Canada were finished.

Lotbinière spent the next ten years in France. With de Lévis' support he re-established his military engineering reputation and clearly held favour at the court of King Louis XVI. He was awarded the Grand Cross of the Order of Saint Louis, and became a Chevalier with a pension of 600 livres, which was doubled in 1781. In 1784 King Louis created him the Marquis de Lotbinière in recognition of the sacrifices he had made by allying himself to the French cause in 1776, the only Canadian to receive this honour. His son, Michel-Eustache-Gaspard-Alain Chartier de Lotbinière, inherited the title but being politically astute did not use it in order to maintain favour with the new British regime in Canada.

== Later life ==
Indefatigable as ever, Lotbinière returned to America in 1787 to once again try to recover his seigneuries at Alainville and Hocquart, but two years of effort proved to be futile. On arriving at New York he had asked permission to return to his home country but Quebec Governor Guy Carleton (Lord Dorchester) categorically refused him re-entry. However in 1790, in the company of his son (then serving as Lord Dorchester's confidential agent) he crossed the border unhindered, revisiting his family and his seigneury at Villechauve. His happiness was short lived. He was forced into exile again after selling Villechauve in 1795 for £9,000 to Alexander Ellice, father of Edward Ellice. To receive her share from the sale, his wife asked for, and obtained, a property separation in 1796.

Embittered and at odds with his family, Chartier de Lotbinière, who had set himself apart from the other seigneurs by the bold stance he had adopted against Governor Carleton, ended his days alone in New York. He died of yellow fever in October 1798, at the age of 75.

He was the father of two children: a son, Michel-Eustache-Gaspard-Alain Chartier de Lotbinière, and a daughter, Marie-Louise, who married Pierre-Amable de Bonne.

== See also ==
- Canadian Hereditary Peers
- Michel, Marquis de Lotbiniere
