= Antoine Juchereau Duchesnay (seigneur) =

Canadian politician (1740–1806)

The Honourable Antoine Juchereau Duchesnay
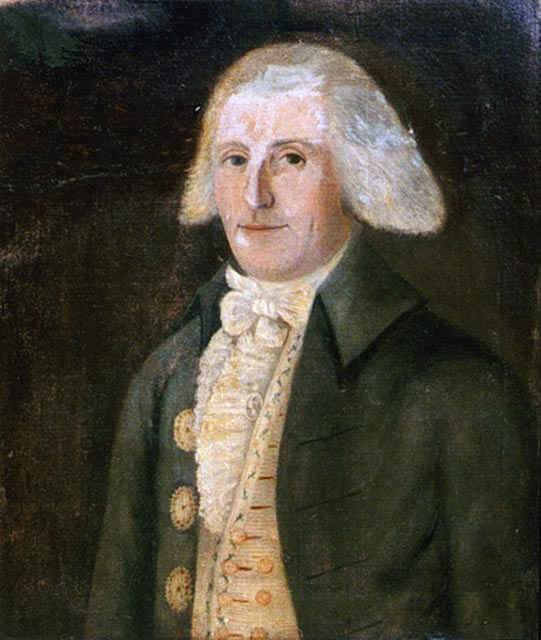

Member of the Legislative Assembly of Lower Canada
- In office 1792–1794
- Succeeded by: The Hon. John Craigie

Member of the Executive Council of Lower Canada
- In office 1794–1806

Personal details
- Born: February 7, 1740 Manoir de Beauport, Quebec
- Died: December 15, 1806 (aged 66) Manoir de Beauport, Quebec
- Party: Parti Canadien
- Spouse: Julie-Louise Liénard de Beaujeu de Villemonde
- Occupation: Seigneur

Antoine Juchereau Duchesnay (French pronunciation: [ɑ̃twan ʒyʃʁo dyʃɛnɛ]; February 7, 1740 – December 15, 1806) was the Seigneur of Beauport, Saint-Denis, Fossambault, Gaudarville, and Saint-Roch-des-Aulnaies. He fought with the Troupes de Marine and after the British Conquest of New France joined the British Army, defending Fort Saint-Jean where he was captured and imprisoned by the Americans in 1775. He represented Buckingham County in the 1st Parliament of Lower Canada and was afterwards appointed a member of the Executive Council of Lower Canada.

== Early life ==
He was born at the family Manor at Beauport, Quebec in 1740. He was the eldest son of Antoine Juchereau Duchesnay (1704–1772), Chevalier de Saint-Louis, 5th Seigneur de Beauport etc., and Marie-Françoise, daughter of Eustache Chartier de Lotbinière. The first of his family to come to New France was Jean Juchereau de Maur, brother of Noël Juchereau des Chatelets. He was a nephew of the Marquis de Lotbinière and Michel d'Irumberry de Sallaberry. He was a grand-nephew of Louis Juchereau de Saint-Denys.

== Career ==
He served as an ensign in the army of New France. After the British gained control of Quebec, he served with the British Army. In 1767, he formed a company to trade with the West Indies. When his father died in 1772, he was the sole beneficiary, inheriting the four seigneuries of Beauport, Fossambault, Gaudarville, and Saint-Roch-des-Aulnaies. From that point on, he spent much of his time administering these properties.

He helped defend the province during the American Revolution and was taken prisoner. His properties were looted during his imprisonment, but he quickly recouped his losses after his release and expanded his property holdings. In 1792, he was elected to the House of Assembly representing Buckingham County and supporting the Parti Canadien. In 1794, he was appointed to the Executive Council of Lower Canada. He died at the Manor house, Beauport, in 1806.

== Family ==
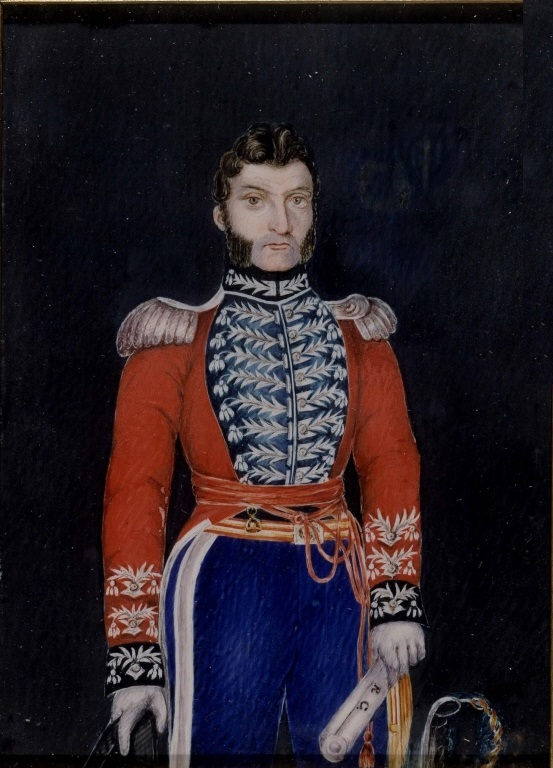
Michel-Louis Juchereau Duchesnay (1785–1838), youngest son of Antoine Juchereau Duchesnay. Shown either in the uniform of a Lieutenant in the King's Royal Rifle Corps or Captain in the Canadian Voltigeurs, circa 1808.

Antoine Juchereau Duchesnay was married twice. In 1765, he married his first wife, Julie-Louise Liénard de Beaujeu de Villemonde (1748–1773), daughter of Louis Liénard de Beaujeu de Villemonde (1716–1802) and niece of Daniel Liénard de Beaujeu. Her mother died when she was young and she was brought up by her father's second wife, Geneviève Le Moyne de Longueuil, granddaughter of Charles le Moyne de Longueuil, 1st Baron de Longueuil. They were the parents of three surviving children,

- The Hon. Antoine-Louis Juchereau Duchesnay, married Marie-Louise Fleury de La Gorgendière, descended from Louis Jolliet who discovered and mapped the Mississippi River in 1673. Their daughter married Colonel The Hon. Bartholomew Gugy.
- Julie-Marguerite Juchereau Duchesnay (1768–1818), became a sister at the Hôtel-Dieu de Québec.
- Louise-Françoise Juchereau Duchesnay (1771–1841), married The Hon. Gabriel-Elzéar Taschereau, Seigneur de Sainte-Marie-de-la-Beauce etc. His son by his first wife, Jean-Thomas Taschereau, was the father of Élisabeth-Suzanne who married The Hon. Henri-Jules Juchereau Duchesnay, grandson of Louise's youngest brother.

In 1778, he married his second wife, Catherine Le Comte Dupré (1759–1836), daughter of Colonel Jean-Baptiste Le Comte Dupré (1731–1820) and Catherine Martel de Brouague, niece of Louis-Philippe Mariauchau d'Esgly, 8th Bishop of Quebec. She was the sister of Colonel The Hon. Georges-Hippolyte le Comte Dupré who married first a daughter of Daniel Liénard de Beaujeu and second a daughter of Luc de la Corne. They were the parents of three surviving children,

- Lt.-Colonel The Hon. Jean-Baptiste Juchereau Duchesnay, married at Quebec City to Eliza Jones of Gosford, England.
- Catherine-Henriette Juchereau Duchesnay (1784–1841), married François Xavier Blanchet, Seigneur de Saint-Denis, Bas-Saint-Laurent.
- Captain Michel-Louis Juchereau Duchesnay, who distinguished himself at the Battle of the Chateauguay under the command of his cousin and brother-in-law, Colonel Charles-Michel d'Irumberry de Salaberry. He married Charlotte-Hermine-Louise-Catherine de Salaberry, daughter of his father's first cousin, Ignace-Michel-Louis-Antoine d'Irumberry de Salaberry. Their daughter married Thomas Edmund Campbell, Seigneur de Rouville. Their son, Édouard-Louis-Antoine-Charles Juchereau Duchesnay, became a member of the Senate of Canada, and the father of The Hon. Henri-Jules Juchereau Duchesnay.

== See also ==
- Canadian peers and baronets
