= François Bigot =

French government official

Francois Bigot
- Born: 1703; Bordeaux, France
- Died: 12 January 1778 (aged 74–75); Neuchâtel, Principality of Neuchâtel
- Military career
- Allegiance: France
- Service years: 1744–1745

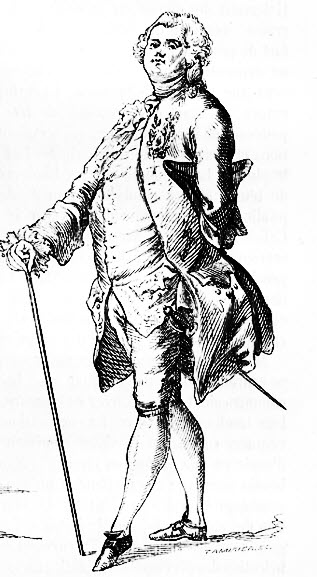
Edmond Lechevallier-Chevignard after Claude Joseph (known as Joseph) Vernet (1714–1789), engraved by Charles Tamisier (active 1855–1864), Matron in the old fashion, Young woman in high hairstyle and small basket, Former soldier, Gentleman with formal dress, in 1762, engraving from Magasin Pittoresque, 1864, n° 32, p. 253. – cropped

François Bigot (French: [fʁɑ̃swa biɡo]; 1703 – 12 January 1778) was a French government official. He served as the Financial Commissary on Île Royale (nowadays Cape Breton Island), commissary general of the ill-fated Duc d'Anville expedition and finally as the Intendant of New France, the last before its conquest by Britain. Subsequently, he was accused of corruption, trialed and convicted in France, and imprisoned in the Bastille for eleven months. Before he could be banished, his sentence upon release, he escaped to Switzerland, where he would live until his death.

== Early life ==
Bigot was born in Bordeaux into a family that had attained nobility. He was the son of Louis-Amable Bigot (1663–1743), Conseilleur du Roi, Counsellor to the Parliament at Bordeaux and Receiver General to the King; by his wife, Marguerite de Lombard (1682–1766), daughter of Joseph de Lombard, Baron du Cubzagués, Commissioner of the Marine at Guyenne and a representative of an old and powerful Guyenne family. His paternal grandfather had become rich from his commercial activities; his father had a successful legal career and held several important government positions. Bigot was to receive, as would befit a gentleman's son, "a good education which included legal studies." Nothing is known for certain of Bigot's education, but historians believed he took a few courses in law at the Faculté de Droit in Bordeaux.

In 1723, at the age of twenty, when legal studies were normally completed, he used his influence within the French Royal Court to join "the commissary of the marine" as a chief scrivener. He served as a scrivener until 1728, when he was made a commissary. He became chief scrivener in 1729, and resident commissary of the Navy in Rochefort in 1732 at the age of 29. Rochefort was a port that saw many fleets kitted out and made ready for their voyages to the Americas. This would be the last post that Bigot would hold in France for some time.

As a young man in France, Bigot had an inordinate love for the gaming tables. The pressure he experienced from both his superiors and his creditors led him to accept a post as the financial commissary of the promising Acadian stronghold, Louisbourg. Another reason why he decided to accept this position, was because the Secretary of State of the Navy, the Count of Maurepas, had explained to him that "an intendancy in the ports of France cannot be expected if one has not served in the colonies." This appointment, about which he was not too happy, became effective on 1 May 1739. He arrived at Louisbourg on the 9 September having come out on the same ship as the newly appointed governor, Isaac-Louis de Forant.

== Louisbourg ==
Bigot wanted to impress his superiors in France. Thus, he began to attend to every aspect of the commissary's duties. He reorganized the bookkeeping and personally supervised operations in detail. In addition, Bigot avoided the conflicts with the governor that had marked the administrations of his predecessors.

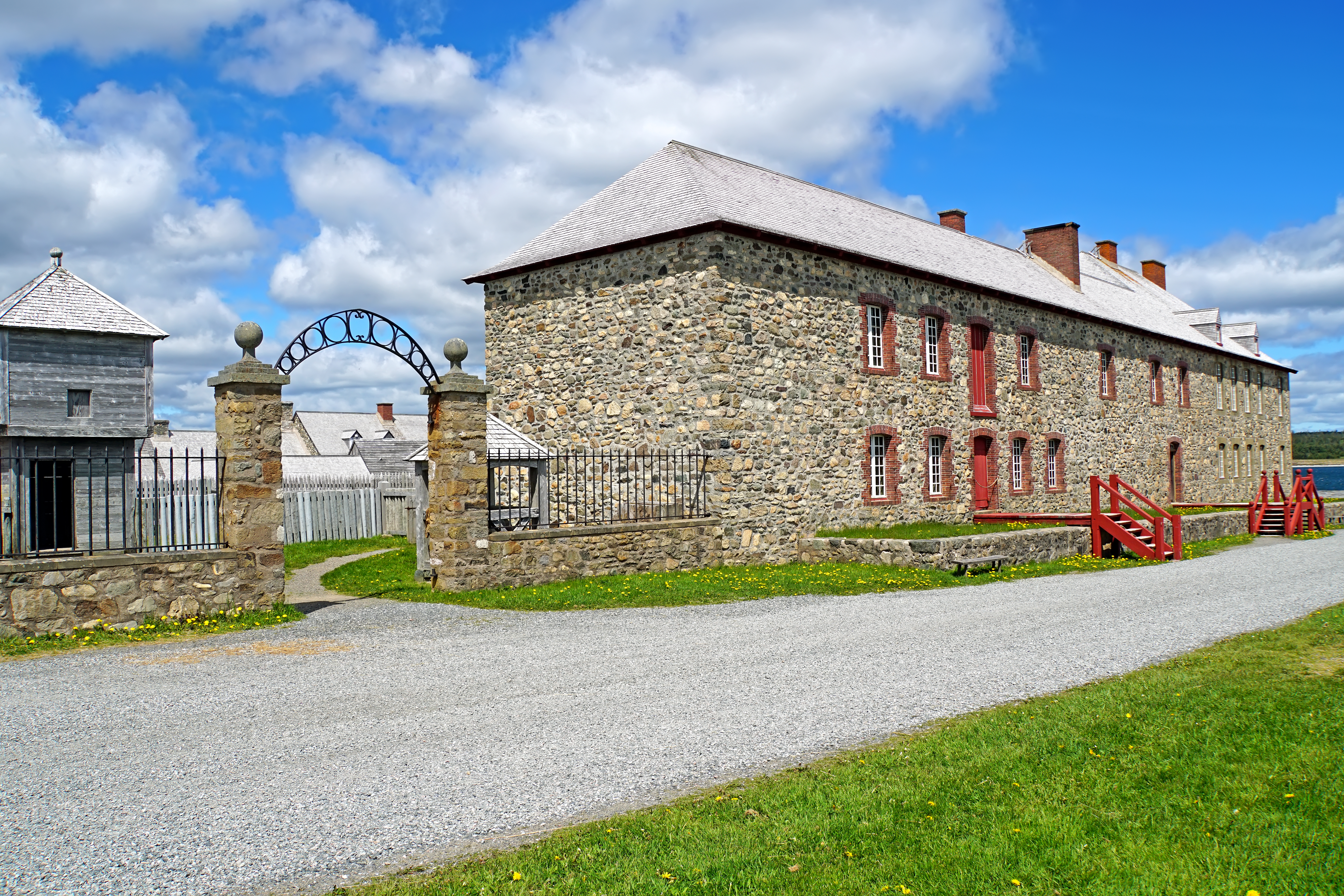
Bigot's reconstructed residence and storehouse at Fortress Louisbourg

After Forant died in May 1740, Bigot befriended François Du Pont Duvivier and Louis Du Pont Duchambon, who were members of the pre-eminent military family in the colony. This friendship was marked by free use of patronage to the Du Pont family, who were beneficiaries of much of it. Payouts, sometimes amounting to thousands of livres, were made to this one family for things such as providing Bigot with boats to carry him about the island, even though the financial commissary had already been granted 1,200 livres annually to defray his transportation costs. This money came at the Crown's expense. Bigot was known for stealing money from the coffers of New France, as well as hiring out the King's workers and pocketing the money.

By 1744, Bigot was an active central figure in the paying business of outfitting and supplying privateers. Preying on the ships of New England was an occupation that involved any number of Frenchmen located at Louisbourg, from the highest in the administration to the lowest of deck hands. In this business, Bigot, as it happened, was a keen supporter of the Du Pont brothers. For example, when Bigot was in partnership with Duvivier and Duquesnel and with Duvivier's brother Michel Du Pont de Gourville, "he held a quarter interest in the Saint-Charles, the total cost of which was 8,850 livres, and Bigot obtained another quarter interest in a larger vessel, the Brador, acquired and fitted out for 34,590 livres."

Also in 1744, Bigot found himself dealing with a mutiny at the Louisbourg garrison. The mutiny was quelled, apparently peacefully, with an amnesty. Bigot was not in charge of dealing with the uprising, and indeed it is unclear how he was involved, but as the official who controlled the finances, it seems likely that his rôle in ending the crisis was a key one.

Maintaining supply links was a problem that Bigot, as financial commissary, had to deal with. However, supply had been a persistent problem for his predecessor, Le Normant. Moreover, between 1741 and 1743, Canada endured three consecutive crop failures. Sometimes supplies were also threatened by various events in Europe and North America. Bigot had no more success in solving the problems than Le Normant. Nevertheless, Intendant Gilles Hocquart asked Bigot for help. Although it was unorthodox, Bigot had no compunction about sending an agent, François du Pont Duvivier, to New England to secure fish, other foodstuffs and other goods from suppliers there when supplies from France or other French possessions seemed unreliable. Bigot was known for keeping the food supply at Louisbourg well stocked, even if he was dealing with France's foes. Indeed, the supply was threatened at one point with the outbreak of hostilities. New England was, of course, still ruled by the British in those days. When the crisis in Québec finally died down, Bigot ended up having enough food and fish to last the colony right through the winter.

As a hedge against the threat of further crop failures, Bigot considered a variety of measures. In 1739, there was a proposal to build a warehouse that would store extra food in case of these crop failures. Bigot brought it up again a few years later. Furthermore, he also wanted to practise agriculture in the areas of Île Royale that were potentially suitable, or on Île Saint-Jean (Prince Edward Island), where the land appeared to him to be fertile. Nevertheless, Bigot never actually did find a permanent solution to this problem. Yet, the population never went hungry.

Before the Siege of Louisbourg, Bigot warned Maurepas that an attack by the British was forthcoming. His warning was quite justifiable, for in April 1745, warships under Commodore Peter Warren instituted a blockade against Louisbourg. On 11 May 1745, American provincial troops commanded by William Pepperrell landed unopposed at Pointe Platte (Simon Point), 1.6 km (0.99 mi) west of Louisbourg. Unfortunately, on 26 May 1745, a unanimous decision was made at the war council that capitulation was the only option. Bigot returned to France on the Launceston, arriving at Belle-Île on 15 July 1745.

== Duc d'Anville expedition ==
After Louisbourg surrendered to the British, François Bigot returned to France only to find his hopes for a posting there dashed. It had been decided that Louisbourg along with the rest of Acadia was to be recaptured by a large expedition commanded by the duc d'Anville. Bigot was appointed commissary general for what became known as the Duc d'Anville expedition and sent to Rochefort to look after the garrison, and to outfit the invasion force destined, it was hoped, to win back some lost glory. This would be no easy task. He had to prepare around 1,100,000 rations of food for the mission. Bigot sailed with the expedition when it finally departed on 22 June 1746. The expedition was beset by storms and lost ships to British capture before it arrived at Chebucto, later to become Halifax, Nova Scotia. Illness devastated the soldiers and sailors of the fleet at Chebucto. The duc d'Anville died and there were rapid changes in command. Louisbourg could not be retaken and only a meagre and unsuccessful siege of Annapolis Royal was mounted. Bigot watched as the whole undertaking that he had prepared with such effort unravelled. He, unlike many others, escaped from it with his life, if not all his belongings, back to France, but not before the ship that he was sailing on was wrecked on a shoal off Port-Louis.

This latest débâcle had its attendant consequences in France, and although Bigot was never actually prosecuted for any perceived failing on his part, he did spend the better part of the next two years endlessly writing reports about the failures. He came through the ordeal with his reputation intact, however.

== Intendant of New France ==
Bigot was eventually sent to New France on 26 August 1748 to become the Intendant, much as it displeased him, for he had no wish to take up such an office. As the Intendant of New France, Bigot's tasks were to direct trade, finance, industry, food supplies, prices, policing, and other matters. His fundamental duty was to assist the Governor in the tasks of imperial expansion. Bigot showed much greater ability at one of the Intendant's traditional tasks, that of maintaining food supplies. Although his record was stained by a greedy attention to personal profit, Bigot fed the forces and the populace better than might have been expected in the hungry winters of 1751–1752, 1756–1757, and 1757–1758.

The growing need to control the food supply was reflected in Bigot's many regulations for the distribution and pricing of grain, flour, and bread. History shows that "authorities managing food supplies, however vigorously and successfully, are usually seen as corrupt, arrogant, and ineffectual." Hence, the word "Tyranny" springs to mind when reading the list of Bigot's decrees such as "directing people's movements and behaviour in detail, prescribing severe punishments for offenders, and relying in criminal cases on the stocks, the gibbet, the execution block and the tortures of the boot." Nevertheless, tyranny of this type was standard French practice.

Furthermore, many of Bigot's laws reflected a paternal effort to save the people of an unsettled frontier society from their own foolishness and lack of civic sense. Even more than previous intendants, he tried to prevent people from firing guns in towns, fighting in church doorways, dumping rubbish in streets and harbours and letting their livestock wander about unattended in the streets. He paved and maintained the streets of Québec with the proceeds of a tax of 30 or 40 livres a year on tavern-keepers, and tried to regulate traffic. Indeed, his authoritarian zeal went so far that Rouillé and other ministers advised him "to leave more of the policing work to the courts." But it was not in Bigot's nature to leave things to courts for he was, after all, an 18th-century naval officer attempting to run the colony as he might have run the naval installations at Brest or Rochefort, where he would rather have been.

Amid accusations of fraud and favouritism, Bigot was recalled to France in 1754 to answer the charges. The next year, however, he was sent back to New France. For François Bigot, a posting to Québec was a kind of exile like a posting to any other remote bastion of the empire and he had to endure it for 12 years. Thus, it is surprising how well he performed his job as the Intendant of New France.

In Canada he owned 3 slaves; 2 from First Nations and 1 from Africa.

== L'Affaire du Canada ==
The fraud of which Bigot was accused was not based upon mere forgery or underhanded ways of misusing funds; it was a system of private enterprise on a grand scale with the collaboration of most of the other colonial officials and many army officers and merchants working under the terms of personal understandings or even formal companies. This sort of corruption was a part of the political culture in Bourbon France, a way of life inevitably promoted by authoritarian governments and not changed until after the French Revolution, when new standards of honesty and new methods of control to enforce them were gradually imposed. Furthermore, Bigot's system of corruption was merely part of a viceregal court which he set up at Québec and which was essentially modelled on the royal court at Versailles: the magnificent social life with parties and lovely dinners in the midst of a wretchedly poor populace, as well as the preferment, employments, contracts, and business opportunities shared out among these tightly knit circles.

The main difference between Bigot and the previous Canadian intendants was that his opportunities for enrichment were much greater at a time when more money was being spent in Canada than ever before. Bigot tried to get involved in every business and always asked for a percentage out of it. As such, while Bigot and dozens of officials and officers in Canada were making private fortunes, "the Canadian populace was suffering from inflated prices, food shortages, and occasional severe famines." As a result, a serious economic crisis developed in which prices rose by 1759 to perhaps "eight times their pre-war level, and in the same year goods in Canada were estimated to cost about seven times more than in France." Various reports of Bigot's commerce and corruption began to reach Versailles soon afterwards.

Unfortunately, the inflation dramatically increased government expenses in Canada, and this expansion in turn increased the financial strain. In 1750 the colony cost the Crown a little more than "two million livres, in 1754 the cost more than doubled, and in a letter of 15 April 1759 the intendant reckoned that the bills of exchange for that year would amount to over 30 millions." Considering that Bigot was spending less than the aforementioned before the war, one might imagine why the enormous demands of the later war years forced the ministry to investigate and then to prosecute the intendant whom they held responsible. Thus, it was big bills rather than tales of corruption, which brought the official wrath down on Bigot's head.

During the Seven Years' War, government expenditures for Canada rose fivefold in four years, from 1755 to 1759. François Bigot and some of his associates, notably David Gradis, were accused of having stolen a great deal of it.

== Fall of New France and consequences for Bigot ==
François Bigot is often seen as a man of marked mercenary tendencies. It was noted in his youth that he was rather fonder of gambling than most men, and superiors in the Navy even upbraided him for it. He was even later blamed for New France's loss to the British Empire during the Seven Years' War; In the Battle for Quebec City, once the British had finally committed to their assault from the Plains of Abraham, just west of the city, Commander Montcalm requested all twenty-five guns [horse drawn artillery] available for deployment, that were positioned in Beaufort Works, east of the Quebec City. Governor Vaudreuil only released three; against the single (one) field piece that Wolf's artillerymen had managed to disassemble and drag up the escarpment.

François Bigot the Intendant of New France had made a habit of renting the artillery unit's horses out to harvesting farmers and the like, for his personal profit, and thus they were not available to be harnessed in front of the guns and moved with all speed west of Quebec City, to engage the British. Arguably, the battle could have been a French victory, had the guns been available to Montcalm.

History records that France freely agreed at the peace negotiations to allow the British to keep New France in exchange for Guadeloupe. Nevertheless, France, seeking a scapegoat for its defeat in North America, obliged Bigot and his friends in a trial that became known as the "Canada Affair" to make good the sum of money that they had supposedly stolen.

When the Seven Years' War began to go badly for France in 1757, the ruling faction of the Duc de Choiseul began to make changes and to look for scapegoats. It was fatally easy for the government to link Bigot's evident corruption with the inflation in Canada. By showing how the corruption and inflation were cause and effect, the Crown came up with an excuse for suspending payments on the Canadian bills of exchange. In view of the defeat at the Plains of Abraham it indeed seemed necessary to suspend payments, which might otherwise end up in the enemy's pockets. The crown was thus able to hide its own expected bankruptcy with a politically and morally necessary suspension of payments. By association, Bigot and the other officials from Canada were soon made to serve as scapegoats for the military and naval disasters as well as the financial ones. On 17 November 1761, Bigot and those associated, including his former business associates Cadet and Péan were arrested. Their trial ensued, which ended with the judgement of 10 December 1763. Bigot's sentence was exile and the confiscation of all his property; heavy fines were imposed on all the convicted men.

Shortly after judgement was delivered on 10 December 1763, Bigot left for Switzerland. He changed his name to François Bar (de Barr), which was his brother-in-law's name, the Sieur de Barre (Bar). He stayed for some time at Fribourg and then went to Neuchâtel. On 18 March 1765, he secured permission to take up residence there, where he would live until his dying day.

François Bigot died on 12 January 1778 in Neuchâtel; he was buried in the little Catholic church of Saint-Martin-L'Évêque in Cressier, a village nearby, as he had requested in his will: "I desire that my body be buried in the cemetery at Cressier without any pomp, just as the poorest person in the parish would be."

No portrait of François Bigot is known to exist. He is sometimes represented by a wood-engraving made in 1855 by the French printmaker Charles Tamisier. The ruins of his residence and storehouse at Louisbourg were excavated and reconstructed in the 1960s by the Canadian Park Service and now form a prominent museum component of the reconstructed Fortress Louisbourg national historic site which explores Bigot's role in the colony.

== See also ==
- Angélique des Méloizes referred to as the Madame de Pompadour of François Bigot.
