= Elzéar-Henri Juchereau Duchesnay =

Canadian politician (1809–1871)

The Honourable Elzéar-Henri Juchereau Duchesnay
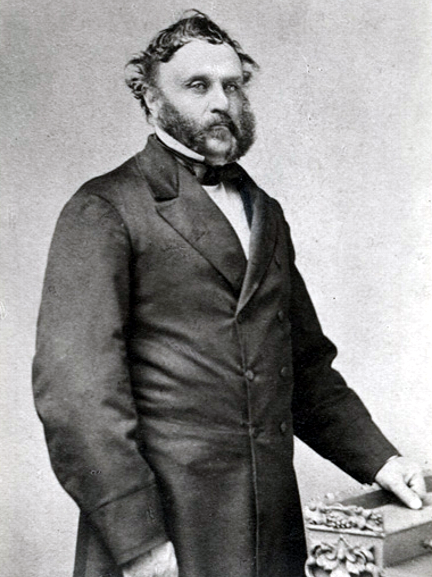

Canadian Senator from Quebec
- In office 1867–1871
- Appointed by: Royal Proclamation
- Succeeded by: Alexandre-René Chaussegros de Léry

Personal details
- Born: July 19, 1809 Beauport, Lower Canada
- Died: May 12, 1871 (aged 61) Sainte-Marie-de-la-Beauce, Quebec, Canada
- Party: Conservative
- Children: Henri-Jules Juchereau Duchesnay

Elzéar-Henri Juchereau Duchesnay (July 19, 1809 – May 12, 1871) was a seigneur, lawyer and political figure in Canada East. He also served in the Senate of Canada from 1867 until his death.

Juchereau Duchesnay, also sometimes referred to as Henri-Elzéar, was born in Beauport, Lower Canada in 1809, the son of Antoine-Louis Juchereau Duchesnay. He studied law, was called to the bar in 1832 and settled at Sainte-Marie-de-la-Beauce. In 1838, on the death of his first wife, Julie Perrault, daughter of Jean-Baptiste-Olivier Perrault, he inherited part of the seigneury of Sainte-Marie. In 1846, he became lieutenant-colonel in the local militia. He was also interested in farming and was president of the county agricultural society. He was elected to the Legislative Council of the Province of Canada in 1856 for the Lauzon division and served until Confederation, when he was appointed to the Canadian Senate. He served as mayor for Sainte-Marie-de-la-Beauce from 1868 to 1870.

He died at Sainte-Marie-de-la-Beauce in 1871.

One of his sons, Charles-Edmond, became superintendent of the Canadian Pacific Railway in British Columbia. Another son Henri-Jules served in the House of Commons. He was the grandfather of François-Xavier Chouinard, clerck of the Ville de Québec until 1961.
