= Michel-Louis Juchereau Duchesnay =

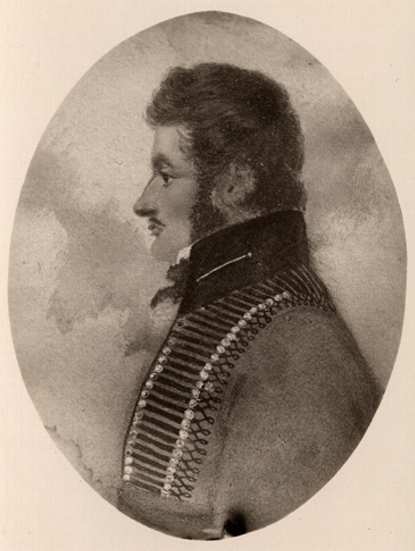
- Born: 14 December 1785; Beauport, Quebec
- Died: 17 August 1838 (aged 52); Petite-Rivière-Saint-Charles, Lower Canada

Michel-Louis Juchereau Duchesnay (French pronunciation: [miʃɛl lwi ʒyʃʁo dyʃɛnɛ]; 14 December 1785 – 17 August 1838) was a Canadian officer, seigneur, and justice of the peace. He was the son of Antoine Juchereau Duchesnay. Both he and his brother, Jean-Baptiste Duchesnay, served in the British Army with the King's Royal Rifle Corps. Duchesnay received his commission in 1805 and quit his regiment with the rank of lieutenant in January 1806. He then returned to Canada to look after his family's estates. There, he married the sister of Colonel Charles de Salaberry. He later served as a captain in the Voltigeurs Canadiens during the War of 1812. According to the Dictionary of Canadian Biography, "he distinguished himself in the battle of Châteauguay on 26 October 1813, as did his brother Jean-Baptiste."
