= Édouard-Louis-Antoine-Charles Juchereau Duchesnay =

Canadian politician (1809–1886)

The Hon. Édouard-Louis-Antoine-Charles Juchereau Duchesnay

Senator for La Salle, Quebec
- In office 1867–1871
- Appointed by: Royal Proclamation
- Succeeded by: Louis Panet

Personal details
- Born: November 8, 1809 Quebec City, Lower Canada
- Died: September 10, 1886 (aged 76) Quebec City, Quebec
- Party: Conservative
- Relations: Michel-Louis Juchereau Duchesnay, father Ignace-Michel-Louis-Antoine d'Irumberry de Salaberry, grandfather

Édouard-Louis-Antoine-Charles Juchereau Duchesnay (French pronunciation: [edwaʁ lwi ɑ̃twan ʃaʁl ʒyʃʁo dyʃɛnɛ]; November 8, 1809 – September 10, 1886) was a political figure in Canada East and a Conservative member of the Senate of Canada.

He was born in Quebec City in 1809, the son of Michel-Louis Juchereau Duchesnay and Charlotte-Hermine-Louise-Catherine d'Irumberry de Salaberry, who was the daughter of Ignace-Michel-Louis-Antoine d'Irumberry de Salaberry. He studied law and was called to the bar in 1832, but never practised. He inherited the seigneuries of Fossambault and Gaudarville when his father died in 1838. He served as deputy adjutant-general in the Lower Canada militia from 1839 to 1842 and was later a lieutenant-colonel in the Portneuf militia.

In 1848, he was elected to the 3rd Parliament of the Province of Canada representing Portneuf. He was elected to the Legislative Council for La Salle division in 1858 and served until Confederation, when he was appointed to the Canadian Senate. His name is recorded there as Antoine Juchereau Duchesnay. He resigned in 1871.

He died in Quebec City in 1886.
