= Jeanne-Françoise Juchereau de la Ferté de Saint-Ignace =

Canadian nun

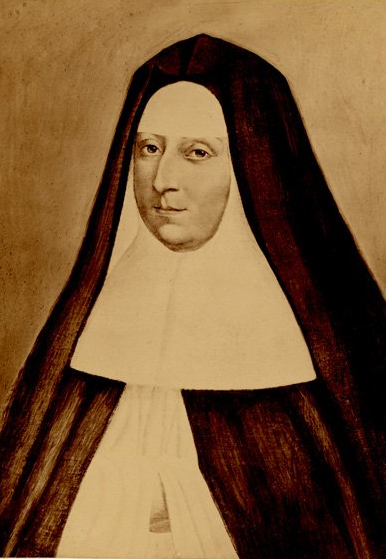
- Jeanne-Françoise Juchereau

Personal life
- Born: 1 May 1650 Quebec City
- Died: 14 January 1723 (aged 72) Quebec City

Religious life
- Religion: Christian
- Institute: Hôtel-Dieu de Québec

Jeanne-Françoise Juchereau de la Ferté de Saint-Ignace (* 1 May 1650 in Quebec City; † 14 January 1723 in Quebec City) was a hospitaller nun of the Order of the Canonesses of St. Augustine of the Mercy of Jesus (Augustines de la Miséricorde de Jésus). She was the 6th superior of the Hôtel-Dieu de Québec hospital and the first Canadian (Canadienne) (Note: This is what people born in New France were called.) to hold this position.

== Life ==
She was the daughter of Marie-Madeleine Giffard and Jean Juchereau de la Ferté, a merchant, born in La Lande-sur-Eure, north-western France around 1620 and died in Quebec City in 1685.

Mother Juchereau was the niece of Mother Marie-Françoise Giffard de Saint-Ignace, also a nun hospitaller of the Augustinian Order, who died on 15 March 1657 and was buried in the choir of the chapel of the Hôtel Dieu de Québec. It is said that she had her niece, who was only six years old at the time, come to her deathbed to bless her and convince her to replace her one day at the Hôtel-Dieu de Québec.

Juchereau entered the monastery as a boarder in 1662 and took the white veil of novices (Note: That symbolizes purity.) two years later. She took her vows on 7 June 1666 under the name of Saint-Ignace, the same name as Marie Guenet, one of the three founding sisters of the Hôtel-Dieu de Québec and her aunt Marie-Françoise.

Juchereau is the author of the famous Histoire de l'hôtel-Dieu de Québec, a text she dictated to Mother Marie-Andrée Regnard Duplessis of Sainte-Hélène at the end of her life, when she was afflicted with a paralysis that kept her in bed and afflicted with a catarrh that made her suffer terribly until her death. The work is a unique and essential source of information on the history of the 17th century and of the hospital-monastery founded in 1639 thanks to donations from the Duchess Marie Madeleine d'Aiguillon and Cardinal Richelieu. Juchereau's text was republished in Quebec City in 1939 by Albert Jamet under the title Annales de l'hôtel-Dieu de Québec, 1636-1716.

"Bursar of the hospital and then of the community, assistant to the superior, mistress of novices, Mother Juchereau gradually climbed the main administrative levels of the community before being elected superior for the first time at the age of 33, a position she held for 24 years, alternating with that of assistant to the superior. As superior, she took the side of religious orthodoxy against Jansenist ideas and did not hesitate to defend the interests of her community by opposing Monsignor de Saint-Vallier when the Quebec General Hospital was created in 1692. Her concern for the sick during the many epidemics that marked this period in the history of New France even earned her the praise of the Governor General of New France, Brisay de Denonville.

- François Rousseau, The Cross and the Scalpel - History of the Augustinian nuns of the hôtel-Dieu de Québec.

== Bibliography ==
- St-Ignace, mère, A.M.J. (1751). Histoire de l'Hôtel-Dieu de Québec. CIHM/ICMH digital series, no 40272 (in French). À Montauban [France]: Chez Jérosme Légier, et se vend à Paris, chez Claude-Jean-Baptiste Herissant, libraire. ISBN 9780659970084. OCLC 70584927. - Digitized from a CIHM microfiche of the original edition held at the Library of the Public Archives of Canada.

In his bibliographical notes on the sources of his own "Histoire de l'hôtel-Dieu de Québec", in "Œuvres complètes", Montréal, ed. C. O. Beauchemin & Fils, t. 4, p. 11, historian Henri-Raymond Casgrain writes of the Histoire de l'hôtel-Dieu de Québec, by Mother Juchereau of Saint-Ignace: "This Histoire was written based on information from the mother (Marie Guenet) of Saint-Ignace and written by the mother of Sainte-Hélène. A copy of these annals having been provided to Mr. de La Tour, dean of the Quebec chapter, who returned to France in 1731, he took it upon himself to have them printed without the knowledge of the Quebec community. This printing was done without much care, and a large number of typographical errors crept into the work. Fortunately, the original copy, in the very hand of the mother (Marie-André Duplessis) of Sainte-Hélène, and signed by the mother (Jeanne-Françoise Juchereau) of Saint-Ignace, is still in the possession of the hôtel-Dieu. These annals are one of the most precious historical documents in our possession.

- Jamet, Dom Albert (1939). Les annales de l'Hôtel-Dieu de Québec 1636-1716 : composées par les révérendes mères Jeanne-Françoise Juchereau de St-Ignace et Marie Andrée Duplessis de Ste Hélène, anciennes religieuses de ce monastère, éditées dans leur texte original avec une introduction et des notes par Dom Albert Jamet de l'Abbaye de Solesmes [Les annales de l'Hôtel-Dieu de Québec 1636-1716: composed by the Reverend Mothers Jeanne-Françoise Juchereau of St-Ignace and Marie Andrée Duplessis of Ste Hélène, former nuns of this monastery, edited in their original text with an introduction and notes by Dom Albert Jamet of the Abbey of Solesmes] (in French). Montreal: Presses de Garden City. OCLC 489930588.

== See also ==
- Canonesses of St. Augustine of the Mercy of Jesus
