= Marie-Françoise Giffard de Saint-Ignace =

- Born: June 11, 1634
- Baptised: 12 June 1634
- Died: March 15, 1657 (aged 22); Quebec City
- Parent(s): Robert Giffard de Moncel

Marie-Françoise Giffard de Saint-Ignace (June 11, 1634 – March 15, 1657) was a Hospitaller of the Hôtel-Dieu de Quebec. She was the first Catholic nun born in present-day Canada.

Marie-Françoise Giffard was born on June 11, 1634, in Quebec City, only days after the arrival in New France of her parents, Robert Giffard de Moncel and Marie Regnouard. Robert Giffard was a surgeon and apothecary who became New France's first colonizing seigneur. In 1646, she took her vows and entered the Hôtel-Dieu, taking the religious name of the recently deceased mother superior, Marie Guenet de Saint-Ignace. Shortly before her death, she passed the name on in turn to her six year old niece, Jeanne-Françoise Juchereau de la Ferté de Saint-Ignace.

Marie-Françoise Giffard died on 15 March 1657 in Quebec City.
