= Criminal justice in New France =

Criminal justice in New France was integral to the successful establishment of a French colonial system in North America. New France had some incidences of crime though overall the rate was quite low and the crimes often benign.

By 1636, the citizens of Québec began to be charged for crimes such as blasphemy, drunkenness and failing to attend Mass. As New France progressed, its legal institutions became more advanced. Promulgated across the France and the French Empire in 1670, the Criminal Ordinance of 1670 provided a foundation for New France's criminal procedures and punishments.

== Criminal procedure ==
Criminal trials in New France followed the inquisitorial procedure detailed by the Criminal Ordinance of 1670. Accusations could be made by citizens or by the attorney-general in the event that a crime had become public knowledge. To discourage false accusations, citizens suing for redress were often obligated to cover the expenses of the proceedings and could be prosecuted for libel if the accused was acquitted.

Once the local judge was convinced that a criminal offense had occurred, he summoned any potential witnesses and held a preliminary hearing (l'information ). If the suspect was identified with certainty during this hearing, they were ordered to appear in court and were suspended from their occupational duties. Due to the poor state of detention facilities, trials were often conducted with great haste to avoid prisoners escaping. In similar fashion, there was a risk of having charges dropped so interrogations under oath with the accused were conducted within 24 hours. A transcript of the interrogation was recorded by a clerk and forwarded to the attorney-general who offered recommendations on how the case be dealt with.

Minor crimes were often delegated to seigneurial courts where fines of up to 500 livres could be handed down. The seigneurial courts, would often then take the liberty of modifying their legislation to reflect trends in crime and would adopt measures for more effective punishments. More serious crimes automatically necessitated "recollement," a procedure which allowed the accused to challenge witnesses and for the latter to confirm their testimonies. The "extraordinary procedure" also provided for the use of torture as one way of extracting confessions in serious cases; torture was also used to induce the accused to name accomplices. Lawyers were not allowed to practice in New France, and most cases were debated between the accused and the witnesses. In similar fashion to the preliminary hearing, a transcript of these proceedings was sent to the attorney-general for a final verdict.

If the attorney general was still undecided, the accused was given a sentence of plus ample informé which allowed them to be released but stipulated that they may be tried again in light of new evidence. If the accused was found guilty, they were brought to court to hear their sentence. All sentences more severe than an amende honorable could be appealed to the Sovereign Council of New France before seven magistrates. Any further appeals were directed to the king's court in Paris where the French monarchy was capable of acquitting even the most serious crimes. Though this was possible, in practice, few cases reached this stage and only seven monarchical pardons were granted prior to 1760.

After opportunities for appeals had been exhausted and the accused was deemed guilty, a sentence was handed down by the judge. Prescribed punishments varied widely and, depending on the offense, could range from a light reprimand (blâme) to execution. All executions were performed by the public executioner and most were performed in Quebec City—where New France's sole hangman was located.

=== Use of torture ===
Depending on the result of the "extraordinary procedure" the attorney-general could order the accused to be tortured. In the hopes of either extracting a confession or learning of potential accomplices, the accused was brought to the court and was tortured under the supervision (theoretically) of a doctor and two surgeons. The conventional torture method was "torture boots" which were wooden planks fastened between the knee and ankle. The torturer would then drive wooden wedges between the planks and the shin, which tightened the planks and significantly increased the level of pain.

Only after the Sovereign Council had sanctioned the use of torture were the courts allowed to proceed. Confessions obtained through torture were insufficient to warrant the death penalty and were otherwise invalid unless repeated by the accused following their recovery. Despite its potential appeal to prosecutors, torture as a method of interrogation was seldom used and records indicate only eight instances of criminal trials which resulted in torture.

=== Judges ===
As opposed to France which required its judges to be university law graduates, there was no requirement for judges to have formal legal training in New France. Few judges in New France had formal training and only the attorney-general of the Sovereign Council was legally required to be a member of the Paris bar. Even though most judges were not professionally trained, they still read and observed the laws carefully and very few people questioned their competence or merit. Many French immigrants with law degrees were recruited as judges; however, a large number of judges were also trained by high-ranking judicial officials in New France. Louis-Guillaume Verrier, an 18th-century attorney-general, lectured many students and sons of officers who wished to pursue a career in criminal justice.

=== Trials involving Indigenous People ===
Court records indicate that Indigenous people were, for the most part, excluded from French laws and were seldom subject to standard criminal procedure. While they were theoretically under the jurisdiction of French law, they enjoyed a fair deal of independence and for the most part rejected French law as a means to punish their own.

=== Acadia ===
Not many records can be found about criminal procedures in Acadia as its judicial archives were burnt down entirely in 1708. That being said, there were surviving records of Mathieu de Goutin, then Civil and Criminal Lieutenant (le lieutenant civil et criminel) of Acadia, trying soldiers who allegedly embezzled money from the reserves of Governor Jacques-François de Monbeton de Brouillan in 1703. Lieutenant Goutin ordered the arrest of the soldiers allegedly involved in the embezzlement, but then decided to release them. A similar incident happened again soon after; the Lieutenant ordered the arrest of the alleged thieves again, and this time, he also ordered a burning wick to be placed between the arrested soldiers' fingers. It was recorded that when the Governor of Acadia visited Versailles, the King said he was "horrified by such cruelty".

== Prevalence of crime in New France ==
Overall, crime rates in New France were low. Despite only 20% of the population living in an urban setting, cities accounted for over 60% of reported crime. Out of the three jurisdictions in the Saint-Laurence Valley, Montréal accounted for approximately 64% of the total crime in the colony. This is partly due to its proximity to Native settlements as well as housing a population that was more conducive to crime. This population included the coureurs de bois, voyageurs, and soldiers - all of which were less concentrated in both Quebec City and rural areas.

The historian Eric Wenzel analyzed the records of 396 trials from courts in Montréal and Québec between 1670 and 1760. Of these, 332 (84%) were tried in Montreal. The large majority of these trials took place after 1700 with various spikes occurring due to a variety of factors such as a series of fires in 1713, 1721, and 1734 which resulted in political pressure that resulted in a harsher treatment of criminals. These issues in combination with a 50% increase in population between 1670 and 1760 gave rise to a substantial increase in criminal proceedings in the Saint-Laurence Valley.

Crime was disproportionately committed by men (80% of accusations). Montreal and Quebec were home to many young, unmarried men, particularly soldiers, and this demographic which accounted for a quarter to a half of the total crime in the Saint-Laurence Valley. The majority of crimes that took place were related to property and sales. Nearly a quarter (96 out of 396) of documented crimes were theft with another 90 cases accounting for the illegal sale of alcohol to natives, as well as 49 cases of illegal sale to the English colonies. This is contrasted to a relatively low number of violent crimes such as murder (23 counts), assault (24 counts), rape (3 accounts), duels (8 counts), and infanticide (5 counts). Other crimes reported include; arson, vagabondage, suicide, desertion, fraud, sacrilege, and disturbing the peace.

=== Military crime ===
Military members who committed crime in New France were in most cases subject to a separate branch of criminal legislation. Military personnel accounted for a roughly a third of the reported crime and were accused of a variety of crimes ranging from property crimes to violent crimes as well as desertion. After committing a crime, members of the military were subject to the War Council (Conseil de Guerre) which was an internal tribunal that was made up of officers of the same corps as the accused.

Despite having separate tribunals for members of the military, if one were to commit a serious crime, they would be subject to the same proceedings as civilians. Once accused, a member of the military had to appear before a court that was presided by a judge who was assisted by a "special lieutenant." The accused represented himself and was forced to defend himself against the accusations brought forth by the prosecutor.

Punishment for military members varied depending on the crime that was committed. Minor crimes were investigated by senior officers and disciplined with military sanctions if found guilty. Punishment was often eight to fifteen days in the dungeon. In more severe cases of minor crimes, such as stealing from a fellow soldier, the convicted man was forced to "run the gauntlet" which entailed running between two rows of soldiers who would proceed to strike the soldier in the back with the butt-end of their muskets before he was forced to renew his oath to the French flag in front of his fellow military brethren.

Military officers were also subject to both military and civilian courts if necessary but were given more privileges than others. They were permitted to wear their swords in court and were given more favourable and honourable sentences if convicted. They were also not to be subjected to the Extraordinary Questioning. All military offenses were liable to be reviewed by the Minister or King and subsequent punishments were handed out if deemed necessary.

==== Desertion ====
Desertion was seen as the most serious offense a member of the military could commit. It was considered to be most dishonourable as it was seen as not only cowardly but also a refusal to fight for king and country. Despite it being a more prevalent problem in Europe, desertion was not very common in New France mostly due to the harsh climate and geography, as well as the various native settlements, all of which made it very difficult to cross into foreign territory. Punishment for desertion varied depending on the year as the King altered legal policy as he saw fit. Military members convicted of desertion were either sentenced to death (with being shot the most common form of execution) or sentenced to the galley where their heads would be shaved and faced having both their cheeks branded and their ears and nose slit. Those who succeeded in deserting were tried in absentia and had their sentences both read out to the members of the army as well as posted publicly.

=== Native crime ===
Although technically under the jurisdiction of the French [ ? according to who ? ], upon being accused of a crime, most Native Americans were not punished under French law but were instead handed over to their tribes to be dealt with through Aboriginal justice. In regards to Native American crime in New France, the Aboriginal peoples were often the targets of crime. When they were the perpetrators, it was mostly due to an infraction related to illegally buying alcohol.

The sale of alcohol to Native peoples was prohibited as it was deemed detrimental to the missionary effort. These laws were later amended in 1710 so that a select few establishments could sell Natives alcohol under certain conditions: they could not get drunk and must have been supplied with a place to sleep for the night. The cabarets were fined 50 livres if they broke these rules. Unauthorized vendors were fined 500 livres if caught. The sale of alcohol to Native Americans was always a contested issue due to various incidents where drunk Natives caused strife including insulting a priest, disturbing the peace and even murder. In most cases no charges were laid, but in the rare incidents in which Native Americans were convicted of drunken conduct, they faced a reduced fine of a few livres or a few days in prison to sober up.

In cases where French citizens committed crimes against Aboriginal peoples, they were punished under the French legal code and the victim was compensated accordingly.

== Punishment ==
The criminal justice system of New France placed a large emphasis on deterring crimes and did so in part by implementing exemplary public punishments. Apart from public shaming, and sending criminals to the stocks; caning, flogging, branding, and even banishment became the most popular forms of punishment in New France. Crimes such as rape, abortion and counterfeiting were some of the most heavily punished offenses and crimes that were committed at night, especially thefts, were generally dealt with more harshly. The court and/or the attorney-general was tasked with devising an appropriate punishment for an offender. The severity of the punishment hinged on the social status of the accused, the severity of the crime, the probability of being guilty and the amount of contrition shown. For most matters, the Sovereign Council was less severe than lower-level jurisdictions and few crimes received the death sentence.

=== Amende honorable ===
The amende honorable was a severe form of punishment in France and New France which required the offender to be stripped naked and led around town by a group of soldiers. The offender would then be adorned with a sign detailing the nature of his crime(s) and was forced to repent to God and the King of France in public. In addition to the humiliation, the offender was often berated by the crowd and soldiers alike and may have indeed been flogged and branded. In some cases, the amende honorable was incorporated into a larger ceremony for corporal punishment, whereby the offender would be executed upon the completion of their public penance.

=== Death penalty ===
The execution rate of those who were convicted of a capital offense was relatively low. Out of 78 convicted offenders, only 41 of them (53%) were eventually put to death. The job of the public executioner was loathed, and often convicted offenders could escape the death penalty if they agreed to take on that role. In 1665, Jacques Daigre was sentenced to death for theft and managed to avoid being executed by agreeing to testify against and execute his associate.

An execution was in theory, intended to take place at the same location that the crime was committed. Given the impracticality of this and the reluctance of boatmen to transport a hangman, most executions occurred in Québec City - the site of New France's lone hangman. An individual's status would also influence their method of execution. Nobles were beheaded while the average citizen of New France was sentenced to the gallows. The Sovereign Council was also capable of altering the sentence of one who was sentenced to death. In the case of Marie-Joseph Angélique, a slave accused and convicted of arson, the Sovereign Council had ordered that she be hanged prior to being burned at the stake as a way of affording her a more humane end.

Although acts of blasphemy or heresy could technically attract death sentences, no records indicate that New France officially executed anyone spiritual crimes. Some historians describe Daniel Vuil as the only resident to be executed for witchcraft, but he was officially sentenced for defying a ban on trading liquor with Indigenous groups.

== See also ==
- French criminal law
- Legal issues of New France
- The Custom of Paris in New France
- New France
