= French Hospital =

French Hospital may refer to:

in Argentina

- French Hospital, Buenos Aires, near the Plaza Miserere (Buenos Aires Metro)

in England

- French Convalescent Home, Brighton, which received patients from the French Hospital in London
- French Hospital (La Providence), formerly in London; now located in Rochester, Kent, it provides almshouse accommodation for Huguenot descendants

in France

- Hôtel-Dieu, ("hostel of God"), the old name given to the principal hospital in French towns
- Hôtel-Dieu-le-Comte de Troyes (home to the Musée de l'Apothicairerie and the Cité du Vitrail de Troyes)
- List of hospitals in France

in Hong Kong

- St Teresa's Hospital, Hong Kong in Kowloon, also known as the "French Hospital"
- St. Paul's Hospital (Hong Kong) in Hong Kong Island, also known as the "French Hospital"

in the United States

- Peter Claver Building, New Orleans, Louisiana, known historically as the "French Hospital"
- French Hospital (Manhattan) was a hospital established in 1881 and closed in 1977
- San Francisco French Hospital, now known as the French Campus of the Kaiser San Francisco Medical Center

in Vietnam

- L'Hôpital Français De Hanoï, also known as the French Hospital of Hanoi

== See also ==
- List of hospitals in France
