= Catherine of St. Augustine =

17th-century French nun and nurse of New France

Blessed Catherine of St. Augustine O.S.A.
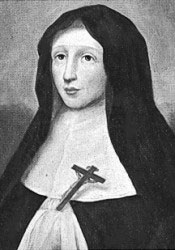
- An image of the Blessed Catherine painted by the Abbé Hughes Pommier about the time of her death

Canoness Regular and missionary
- Born: 3 May 1632; Saint-Sauveur-le-Vicomte, Province of Normandy, Kingdom of France
- Died: 8 May 1668 (aged 36); Quebec City, New France, French Colonial Empire
- Venerated in: Roman Catholic Church (Quebec)
- Beatified: 23 April 1989 by Pope John Paul II
- Major shrine: Centre Catherine-de-Saint-Augustin, Québec, Canada
- Feast: 8 May

Mary Catherine of St. Augustine, OSA (French: Marie-Catherine de Saint-Augustin) (3 May 1632 – 8 May 1668) was a French canoness regular who was instrumental in the development of the Hôtel-Dieu de Québec in the colony of New France. She has been beatified by the Catholic Church.

== Early life ==
She was born Catherine de Simon de Longpré in the town of Saint-Sauveur-le-Vicomte, then part of the ancient Province of Normandy in France. Raised primarily by her grandparents, as a child she showed a marked concern for the needs of the sick and the poor. In 1644, she entered the monastery of the Canonesses of St. Augustine of the Mercy of Jesus in Bayeux, which operated the Hôtel-Dieu of the city. She was received into the novitiate of the Order on 24 October of that year, at which point she was given the religious name by which she is now known.

== New France ==
In the year 1648, she was among those of the Order who responded to the appeal to help the canonesses in Quebec who had founded the Hôtel-Dieu there for the needs of the colony. On 31 May, then aged 16, Catherine set sail for the colony. While en route, she fell victim to the plague, from which she was cured in what seemed a miraculous way, which she attributed to the protection of the Blessed Mother, through the means of a statue of her which she had brought with her from France and which is still revered as miraculous. She arrived in the port of Quebec on 19 August.

After Catherine's arrival, she began the task of nursing the sick in the hospital of the monastery, attending to both their spiritual and physical needs. She learned the languages of the First Peoples of the region to serve them better. She would work to bring the patients closer to God. The superior of the hospital later testified that she and the other canonesses could tell that Catherine would spend long periods in prayer and undertake severe mortifications of her body in support of her spiritual mission, to the point of endangering her own health.

At the same time, Catherine spent nine years as treasurer of the hospital. Additionally, she was entrusted with the task of forming new candidates for the community as Novice Mistress. Her superior and the famed Ursuline of Quebec, Marie of the Incarnation, attested to the sweetness of disposition Catherine continually exhibited in dealing with others throughout her life, and for which she was known throughout the colony.

=== Barbe Hallay case ===
Catherine notably cared for Barbe Hallay, a young servant and alleged victim of demonic possession who was sent to the Hôtel-Dieu in December 1660, on the orders of Bishop François de Laval. Hallay was reportedly cursed by Daniel Vuil, a colonist whom she had rejected as a husband.

Jesuit priest Paul Ragueneau, Catherine's eventual biographer, wrote that Catherine had unwaveringly attended to Hallay, despite experiencing torment by Hallay's demons herself. Marie of the Incarnation similarly wrote that Hallay's demons "beat [Catherine] outrageously". At one point, Pierre Chastellain informed Marie that Catherine boasted "arms black as ink from the blows she had received" while guarding Hallay. Hallay's admission to the Hôtel-Dieu coincided with the outbreak of a mysterious illness among colonists that was deemed both contagious and deadly. Symptoms included an intense cough and a fever.

Hallay remained under Catherine's care until 1662, when the girl returned to her employer.

=== Death ===
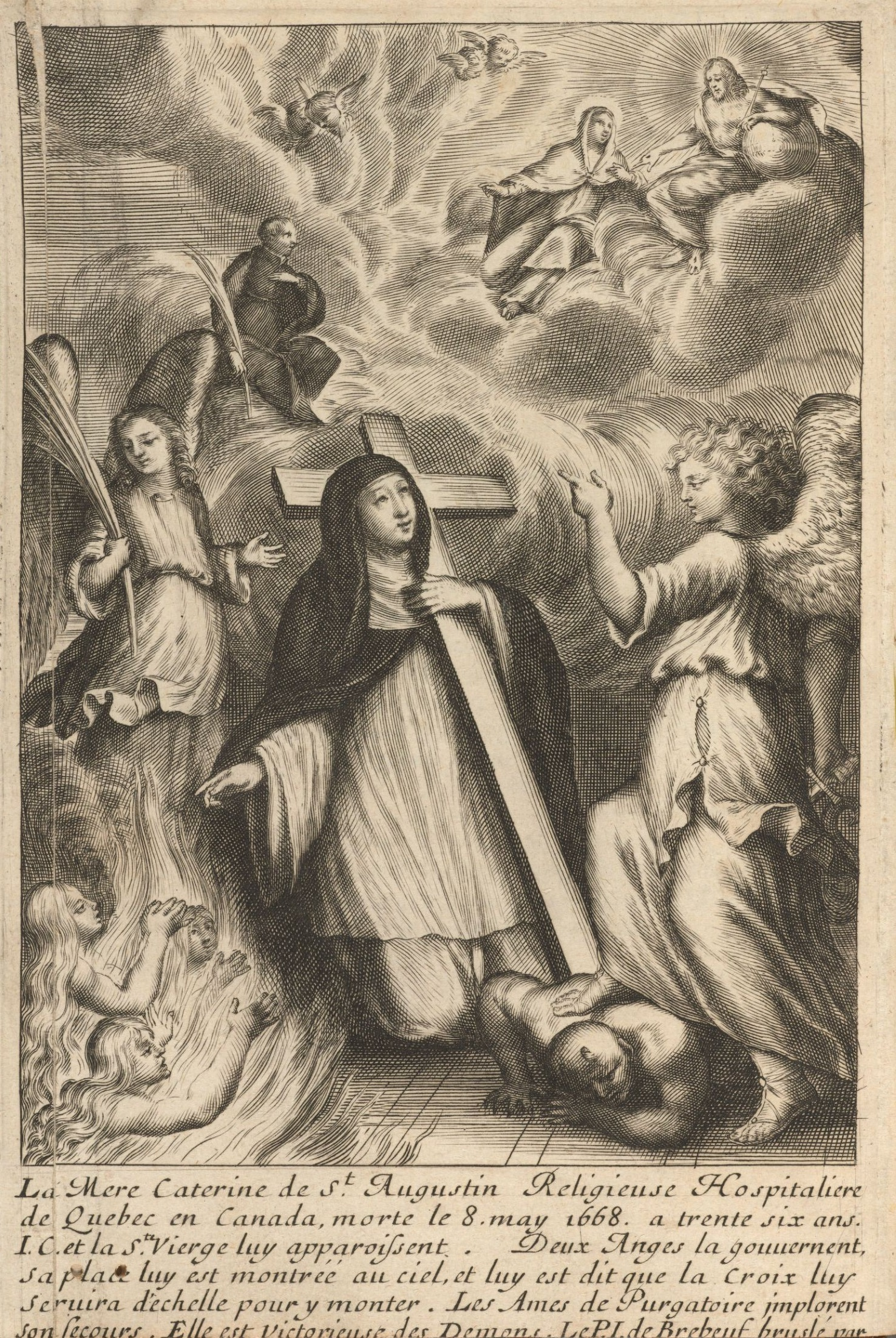
La vie de la mere Catherine de Saint Augustin by Paul Ragueneau, 1671

Towards the end of her life, Catherine began to lose weight and suffer from frequent exhaustion. Her superior Marie initially suspected that Catherine was suffering from a serious disease, but she later believed that Catherine was experiencing residual symptoms of demonic activity. Ragueneau similarly believed that Catherine's exposure to demonic activity had caused illnesses that physicians would not be able to treat.

Catherine died in 1668 at the hospital she had helped to run, aged 36. She was widely held by the people of New France to have been a saint.

== Veneration ==
Due to her self-sacrifice for both the European settlers of the colony and for the native inhabitants, Catherine came to be honoured as one of the six founders of the Catholic Church in Canada, representing the contributions of the Augustinian canonesses. The cause for her canonization was formally opened on 28 July 1926, granting her the title of Servant of God.

Catherine was declared to have lived a life of extraordinary virtue on 9 March 1984 by Pope John Paul II. Declaring that she offered her life for the establishment of the Catholic faith in Canada, this same pope, on 23 April 1989, beatified her.

Catherine's feast day is celebrated in Quebec on 8 May. Her remains are preserved for veneration at the Centre Catherine-de-Saint-Augustin, adjacent to the Hôtel-Dieu.
