= Hôtel-Dieu =

In French-speaking countries, a hôtel-Dieu (English: hotel of God) was originally a hospital for the poor and needy, run by the Catholic Church. Nowadays these buildings or institutions have either kept their function as a hospital, the one in Paris being the oldest and most renowned, or have been converted into hotels, museums, or general purpose buildings (for instance housing a préfecture, the administrative head office of a French department).

Therefore, as a secondary meaning, the term hôtel-Dieu can also refer to the building itself, even if it no longer houses a hospital.

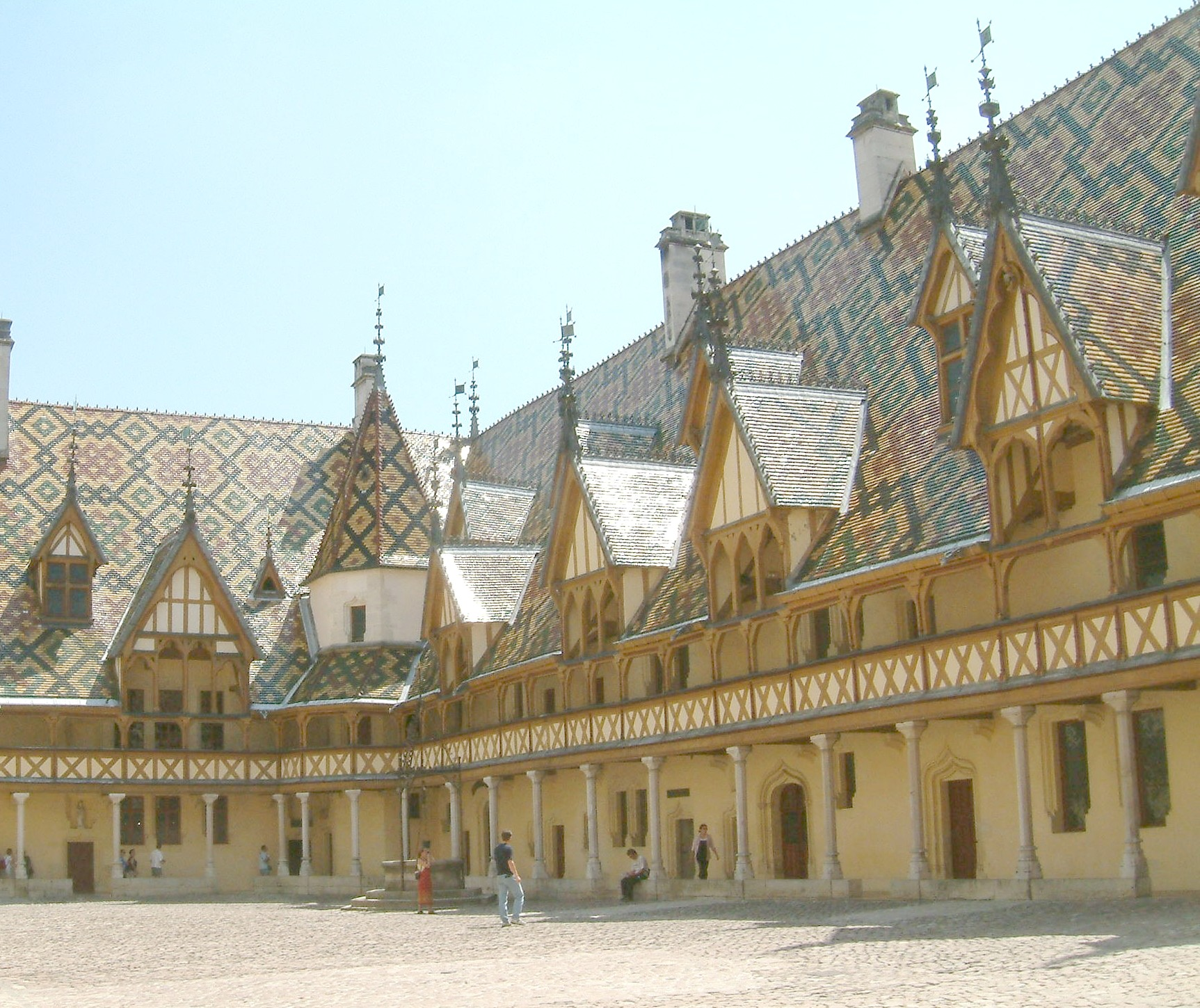
The hôtel-Dieu of Beaune, boasting a beautifully preserved courtyard

Examples include:

Belgium

- Notre Dame à la Rose, founded in 1242

France

- Hôtel-Dieu d'Angers, founded in 1153
- Hôtel-Dieu de Beaune, founded in 1443
- Hôtel-Dieu of Carpentras, built in 1754
- Hôtel-Dieu of Château-Thierry, founded in 1304
- Hôtel-Dieu of Cluny, built in the 17th and 18th century
- Hôtel-Dieu de Lyon, created in 1478
- Hôtel-Dieu of Nantes, completed in 1508
- Hôtel-Dieu de Paris, founded in 650
- Hôtel-Dieu of Reims
- Hôtel-Dieu de Tonnerre, founded in 1293
- Hôtel-Dieu Neuf de la Trinité of Thiers, later part of Thiers old hospital.

Canada

- Hôtel-Dieu de Montréal, Montreal, Quebec
- Hôtel-Dieu de Québec, Quebec City, Quebec
- Hôtel-Dieu de Sherbrooke (CHUS), Sherbrooke, Quebec
- Hôtel-Dieu Grace Hospital, Windsor, Ontario
- Hotel Dieu Hospital (Kingston, Ontario), Kingston, Ontario
- Hotel Dieu Shaver Health and Rehabilitation Centre, St. Catharines, Ontario

United States

- University Hospital, New Orleans, previously known as Hôtel-Dieu
- Hotel Dieu Hospital, Beaumont, Texas, founded in 1896 and consolidated with Saint Elizabeth's Hospital in 1970
- Hotel Dieu Hospital, El Paso, Texas, founded in 1893 and permanently closed in 1987

Lebanon

- Hôtel-Dieu de France, Beirut, Lebanon, a private hospital owned by the French state

== See also ==
- French Hospital (disambiguation)
- Hôtel-Dieu-le-Comte de Troyes
- List of hospitals in France
