= Daniel Vuil =

17th-century miller and witchcraft suspect executed in New France

- Born: c. 1627
- Died: October 7, 1661; New France
- Cause of death: Executed by arquebus
- Citizenship: France
- Occupation: Miller
- Known for: Possibly the only resident of New France to be executed for witchcraft
- Criminal charges: Blasphemy; Bootlegging
- Criminal penalty: Excommunication; Capital punishment

Daniel Vuil (also recorded as Vuril, Voil, or Wril; d. October 7, 1661) was a miller who lived in New France during the 17th century until his execution in 1661.

Extant records provide that Vuil was suspected of being a witch, leading some historians to identify him as the only witch to be sentenced to death in New France. However, he was most likely officially executed for illicitly trading alcohol.

== Life before New France ==
Vuil was a citizen of France and a Huguenot, or French Protestant. Historian Mairi Cowan estimates that he was born between 1627 and 1637. While in France, he worked as a miller.

In April 1659, Vuil boarded a ship bound for Quebec from the port city of La Rochelle. Also aboard was François de Laval, who had recently been appointed vicar apostolic of New France. At this time, only Catholics were permitted to settle in New France, so Vuil converted to Catholicism, facilitated by Laval.

Vuil also developed an unrequited romantic interest in fellow passenger, Barbe Hallay, who was around fourteen years old. Some historians suggest that Hallay herself refused Vuil's proposal; others posit that her parents forbade the union, believing Vuil was an unsuitable match for their daughter due to his Protestant upbringing. The only contemporary source detailing Vuil's bid to marry Hallay is an account written by Marie of the Incarnation, whose subordinate Catherine of St. Augustine later cared for Hallay. Marie's account is ambiguous as to why Vuil believed Hallay had been "promised" to him, but when it became clear that Hallay would not marry him, he vowed to "avenge" the refusal.

Upon arriving in June 1659 to what is today Quebec City, Vuil resumed his trade as a miller.

== Life in New France ==
According to the nun Marie, colonists quickly regarded Vuil as a man of poor morals, perhaps due to his profession. Millers were poorly regarded at this time, as they enjoyed a monopoly over the machinery that farmers needed to grind grain into flour. Vuil faced accusations of selling alcohol to Indigenous peoples at some point after May 1660, when Bishop François de Laval prohibited the practice under threat of excommunication.

Protestants were also viewed poorly by the Catholic community, and locals believed Vuil's conversion to their faith was inauthentic; he reportedly did not attend Catholic mass. Selling alcohol to Indigenous peoples was, itself, an activity closely associated with Protestants.

Historians André Vachon and Mairi Cowan posit that, because colonial authorities of the time resorted to capital punishment only in extreme cases, Vuil was likely a frequent source of disruption in the community. However, as writer Johanna Bertin notes, no surviving records from the time contain evidence substantiating that Vuil was ever involved in any criminal activity.

=== Allegations of witchcraft ===
Barbe Hallay, the teenager Vuil had hoped to marry, quickly found work as a domestic servant at an estate in nearby Beauport, owned by seigneuresse Marie Regnouard. Around July 1660, a year after her arrival in New France, Hallay began to experience visions that locals believed were demonic in nature. Visitors to Hallay's place of employment reportedly heard drum and flute music emanating from no particular source, and witnessed stones flying across rooms as though thrown by an unseen person. Hallay, who was also prone to violent outbursts, claimed that Vuil appeared to her in visions and identified himself as the source of her condition.

Colonists interpreted these instances as evidence that Hallay was possessed by a demon. Paul Ragueneau, a local Jesuit missionary, wrote of her condition: "[The] possessed girl saw the demons who appeared to her under various shapes of men, women, children, beasts and hellish spectres, and, at last spoke through her mouth... without seemingly using the possessed girl's voice."

Hallay's case came to the attention of Bishop François de Laval, who was reportedly outraged by reports that Vuil's conversion to Catholicism was insincere. Laval arranged for Hallay to undergo two exorcisms, though neither cured her erratic behaviour, so she was placed under the care of Augustinian nuns at the Hôtel-Dieu de Québec in December 1660.

Historian Mairi Cowan notes that, at the time of Hallay's possession, female colonists were being pressured to wed and have children. New France's society expected women to submit to either their parents or husbands. Being a victim of demonic possession granted women the "contradictory agency" to defy convention "without needing to take full responsibility" for their actions. Hallay may have genuinely believed she was plagued by a demon; however, it is also possible that she feigned possession to avoid future marriage proposals.

== Legal troubles ==
=== February arrest and punishment ===
Vuil was arrested in early 1661 as a suspected "relapsed heretic, blasphemer, and profaner of the sacraments". The Jesuit Relations, a chronicle of contemporary reports by missionaries, provide that New France's colonial authorities argued over whether punishing Vuil was an ecclesiastical matter or a secular one. The former would make Vuil's case the responsibility of Bishop Laval; the latter would make it the responsibility of Pierre de Voyer d'Argenson, governor of New France.

Bishop Laval ultimately excommunicated Vuil in February 1661. The Relations reported that Vuil had a "long history" of unspecified crimes that were detailed elsewhere, though these documents were lost in subsequent centuries. Incomplete records of Bishop Laval's correspondence with Governor d'Argenson suggest that Laval subsequently attempted to build a case against Vuil for witchcraft against Barbe Hallay. d'Argenson was unsupportive of these efforts, in part because he believed Laval was overstepping in governance matters.

=== Later events and October execution ===
It is unknown whether Vuil remained in custody until his death in October, or indeed, whether his judgment in February had any bearing on his execution at all. However, historian William Kingsford notes that Vuil may have been the unknown colonist who performed "public penance" for being excommunicated on April 3, 1661. If Vuil was kept in custody, he was likely held at the on-site prison within Château Saint-Louis, the residence of the governor of New France.

An account by the nun Marie claims that authorities at least accused Vuil of bewitching Hallay some time after his February arrest. Vuil denied the allegations and protested his innocence until at least September 1661, the same month that d'Argenson was replaced as governor by Pierre Dubois Davaugour. Davaugour was, at least initially, more receptive to Laval's requests than d'Argenson.

Vuil was executed on October 7, 1661. That month's entry of the Jesuit Relations detailed that Vuil was "hanged, or rather shot" with an arquebus; a few days later, colonial authorities flogged a different colonist for "having traded brandy to the savages". The proximity of Vuil to this unknown liquor trader in the record suggests that Vuil was similarly punished for selling liquor to Indigenous groups, but this was not made explicit until 19th century editions of the Jesuit Relations listed both punishments under the heading "Executions for trade".

==== Discussion of crime and sentence ====
Other than the Jesuit Relations, no contemporary records claim to note the precise reason for Vuil's execution, which remains a matter of historical debate. Local missionary Paul Ragueneau wrote that Vuil was found guilty of several charges, including blasphemy and falsely converting from Protestantism; Ragueneau's work was published a decade after Vuil's death.

At the time of Vuil's execution, liquor trafficking was not punishable by death in the colony. Blasphemy, witchcraft and falsely converting to Catholicism could technically attract capital punishment, though colonial authorities rarely punished these offences with death. If Vuil was punished for spiritual offences, he was the only person sentenced to death for heresy in New France. In any case, colonists familiar with Barbe Hallay likely believed that witchcraft was the reason for Vuil's death.

The Jesuit Relations' ambiguous description of Vuil as being "hanged, or rather shot" has also led some historians to disagree on Vuil's method of execution. Cowan posits that the Jesuit Relations' chronicler intended to write solely that Vuil was killed by gunshot, hence their immediate attempt at self-correction. Although Ragueneau's 1671 publication claimed that Vuil was hanged, most historians accept that Vuil was executed by arquebus. It is likely that he faced one executioner rather than a firing squad, owing to the customs of the time.

== Aftermath ==
Vuil's burial site is unknown.

Barbe Hallay recovered from her apparent possession in October 1662, a year after Vuil's execution, while under the care of her original employer Marie Regnouard. Regnouard entered Hallay's room one night while the girl was exhibiting signs of another demonic fit, brandishing a relic from Jean de Brébeuf. After the martyred Brébeuf's bone made contact with Hallay, Hallay's symptoms ended and did not return. Regnouard effectively performed an exorcism as a woman and a layperson, both of which remain prohibited by the Catholic Church as of the 21st century.

Hallay married a local man named Jean Carrier in 1670, with whom she had four children. Hallay died in June 1696, around the age of fifty.
