= Canonesses of St. Augustine of the Mercy of Jesus =

Roman Catholic religious order

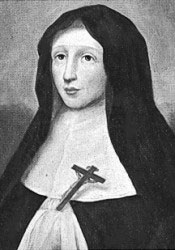
- The Blessed Catherine of St. Augustine, O.S.A., (1632–1668) a foundress of the Order's hospital in New France
- Abbreviation: O.S.A.
- Formation: c. AD 1300; 726 years ago
- Founders: Anne LeCointre, Marie Guenet, Marie Forestier
- Type: Catholic religious order
- Headquarters: France
- Website: Official Website

The Canonesses of St. Augustine of the Mercy of Jesus (Augustinian Hospitallers) are a Roman Catholic religious order of canonesses who follow a semi-contemplative life and are also engaged in the ministry of caring for the sick and needy, from which they were also known as the "Hospital Sisters".

== History ==
The canonesses' origins were in the 13th century, when a group of women in France joined together to assist the Augustinian Hermit friars who cared for the poor and the sick at the Hôtel-Dieu of the fishing port of Dieppe. Known originally as the "Hermit Sisters of St. Augustine", they formed a lay confraternity following the Rule of St. Augustine, wore a black habit, lived on goods held in common and on alms, and under a set of constitutions drawn up for their use. They cared for victims of scurvy, plague, leprosy and fever prevalent in the overcrowded town. Apart from the services they rendered to the Hôtel-Dieu, they were also employed in assisting the sick poor in all quarters of the city. They would visit and care for the destitute living in their hovels, or even lodging in caves hollowed into the cliffs of the region.

In 1625 they were formed into a religious congregation under the spiritual authority of the friars. They took on strict papal enclosure and changed to the white habits of the Canonesses of St Augustine. Monasteries were founded in Normandy, Maine, and Brittany.

The constitution of the new congregation established two classes of religious: lay sisters and canonesses. The former were employed at the manual tasks of the community, in order to relieve the canonesses. They were not obliged to recite the Divine Office, nor did they nurse the sick. The canonesses begin the day by singing Morning Office and Mass, and meet again at midday and in the evening for prayer and a meal, completing the day with Compline and recreation.

The General Chapter was composed of all who are ten years professed. They elected a Superior General triennially, but her charge could not be prolonged beyond six years. They also elected the Assistant Superior General, the Mistress of novices, the treasurer, and four other advisers, thus forming a council of eight principal officers.

== New France ==
In 1639, the canonesses opened their first hospital outside of Europe in New France, with the establishment of the Hôtel-Dieu de Québec, which was the first hospital in North America north of Mexico. The sisters administered the hospital until 1962. A new hospital for the poor was built in 1693 by Jean-Baptiste de Saint-Vallier, the second Bishop of Quebec, known as the Hôpital-Général de Québec. Initially four canonesses were sent to help in running the hospital. The bishop formally entrusted it to the canonesses of the Hôtel-Dieu in 1698, and the Sisters who served there became an independent monastery in 1701. Catherine of St. Augustine, O.S.A., who was among the first volunteers to go to Quebec, was beatified by Pope John Paul II in 1989.

By the 19th century they had communities in France at Dieppe, Rennes, Eu, Vitré, Château-Goutier-St-Julien, Château-Goutier-St-Joseph, Malestroit, Auray, Tréguier, Lannion, Guingamp, Morlaix, Pont-l'Abbé, Gouarec, Fougères, Harcourt, and Bayeux; and in Quebec, in addition to the foundations in the city of Quebec, there were communities in Lévis and Chicoutimi. They became established as well in South Africa, where communities were founded at Natal, Durban, Ladysmith, and Pietermaritzburg. Sisters from the Monastery of Pont L’Abbé in the Diocese of Quimper established a foundation at Estcourt.

Communities also were established in the Netherlands at Maasbracht; and in Italy, at Turin. They arrived in Britain in 1902, establishing over the years nursing homes in Waterloo and in Cumbria (1921, Boarbank Hall).

During the Second World War, the canonesses of Dieppe ran an underground hospital, La Bimarine, where they cared for wounded French and Allied soldiers.

== Present day ==
Due to declining numbers, in 2015 the sisters closed Park House at Merseyside which had served as a convalescent home for soldiers during World War I. With the closing of Park House, the sisters from Liverpool joined with those of Boarbank and Ince Blundell Hall. The Sisters at Boarbank Hall in Cumbria run a Nursing Home and Guest House.

The sisters operate a health clinic in the Diocese of Maiduguri in North Eastern Nigeria.
