= Hôtel-Dieu-le-Comte de Troyes =

Hospice in France

Hôtel-Dieu
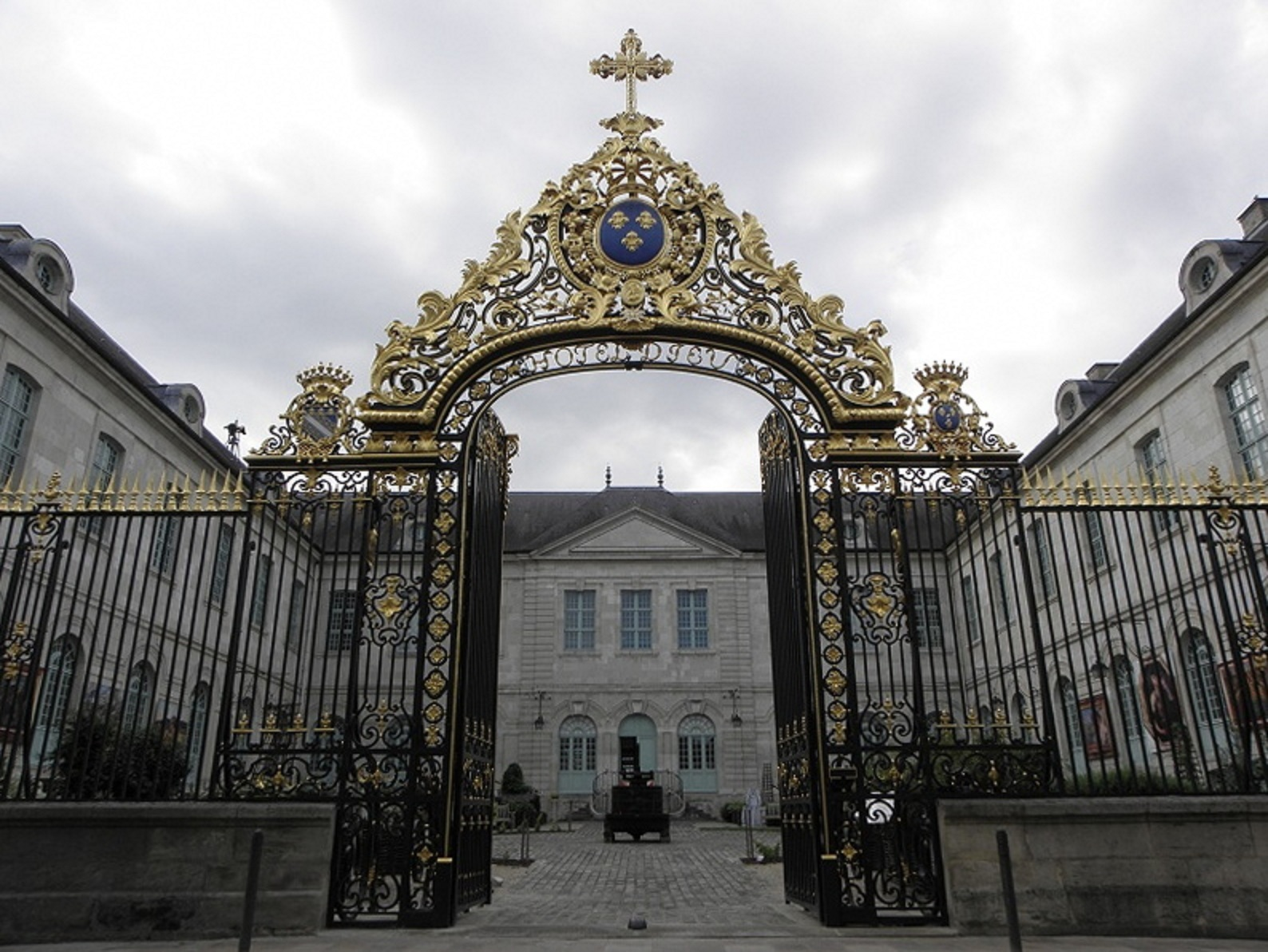
- The courtyard and gate of the Hôtel-Dieu, entrance to the museum.

General information
- Location: Troyes, Aube, Grand Est, France
- Coordinates: 48.2990°N 4.0789°E
- Owner: Aube department

Design and construction
- Designations: Hospice

The Hôtel-Dieu-le-Comte de Troyes was a hôtel-Dieu in Troyes, France, now home to the Musée de l'Apothicairerie and the Cité du Vitrail de Troyes. Part of the building is also used by the Troyes University Center, part of the University of Reims-Champagne-Ardenne.

The U-shaped building is built between the courtyard and the garden. Two additions on the west wing house the chapel and apothecary. The courtyard is enclosed by a monumental wrought-iron gate.

It is known as Hôtel-Dieu-le-Comte or Maison-Dieu-Saint-Étienne.

== History ==
The hôtel-Dieu was founded in the 11th century by Count Henry the Liberal of Champagne, and held by the Augustinian order with assets such as a mill in 1174. It is part of the same foundation as the collegiate church of Saint-Étienne de Troyes and was under the same name of Domus Dei B. Stephani. Stephani. It was part of the palace complex of the counts of Champagne, which included the palace, the collegiate church and the Hôtel-Dieu.

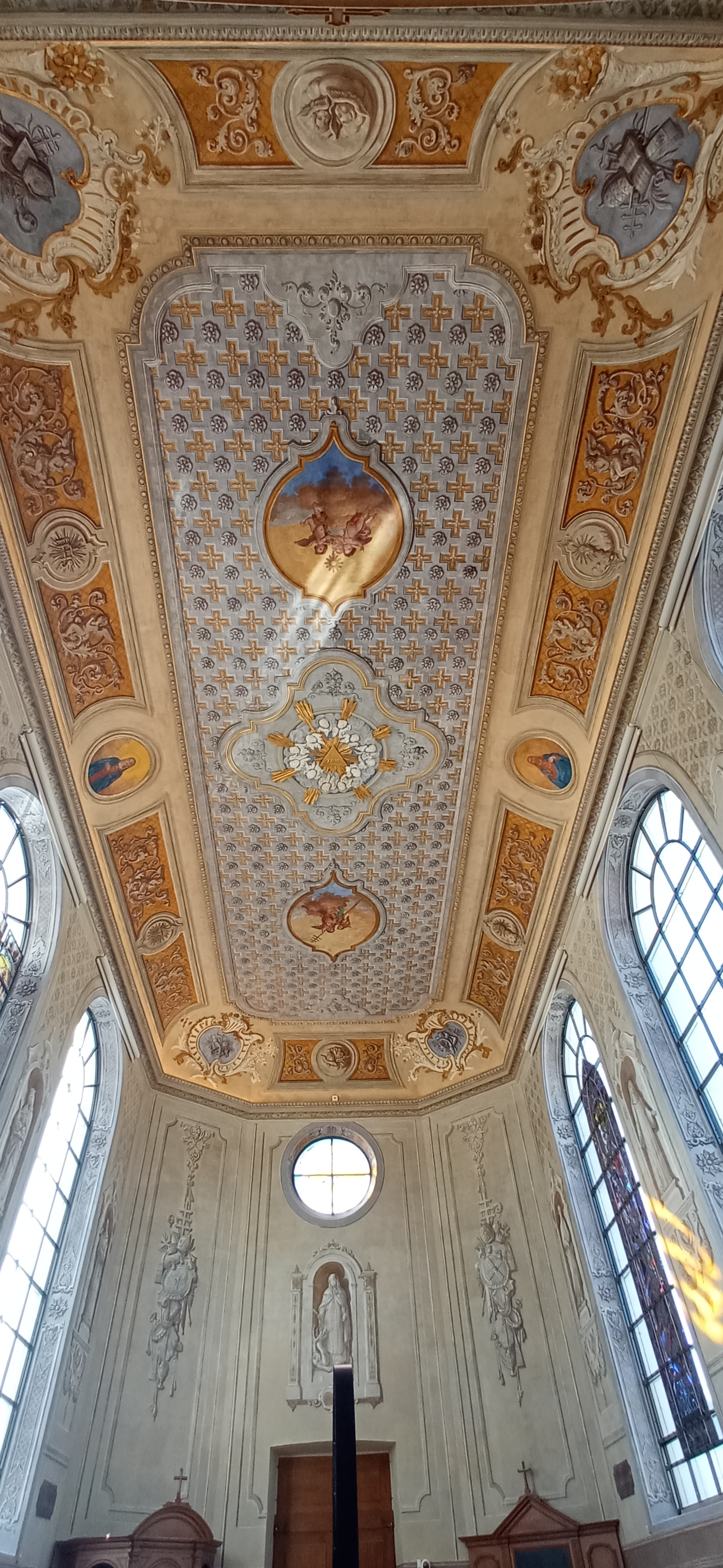
Interior of the Chapel of the Hôtel-Dieu of Troyes

It is the largest of the city's five hôtels-Dieu and one of only two surviving buildings, along with the hospice Saint-Nicolas de Troyes. It has its own possessions, such as the mills at Trévois, the tannery, the oven and the barn at Croncels. It has been under the king's authority since 1284 and has two responsibilities: to welcome pilgrims and, if it did not receive lepers, the blind, one-armed people and other cripples, foundlings because they could not be cured, and women after they had given birth until they could be raised. In the 16th century, the facility was extended to all populations, and it remained a medical center until 1988.

=== Buildings ===
Enlarged in 1270 by a donation from Renaud de Bar-le-Duc, the church had its own chapel and cemetery. The two-level chapel was dedicated to Sainte-Marguerite, where the dead were laid to rest below, and to Saint-Barthélemy in the upper chapel. The hôtel-Dieu was enlarged in 1482 and 1494, and its façade on rue de la Cité was rectified in 1631. It was rebuilt between 1701 and 1764 to its current configuration. The gate was designed by Pierre Delphin at the request of Troyes bishop François Bouthillier and Troyes mayors Louis de Mauroy and Jacques Berthelin. The chapel stands on the site of the former Girouarde gateway to the city via Agrippa.

The hôtel-Dieu was listed as a historic monument in 1889 (the gate) and 1964 (the facades and roofs of the buildings).

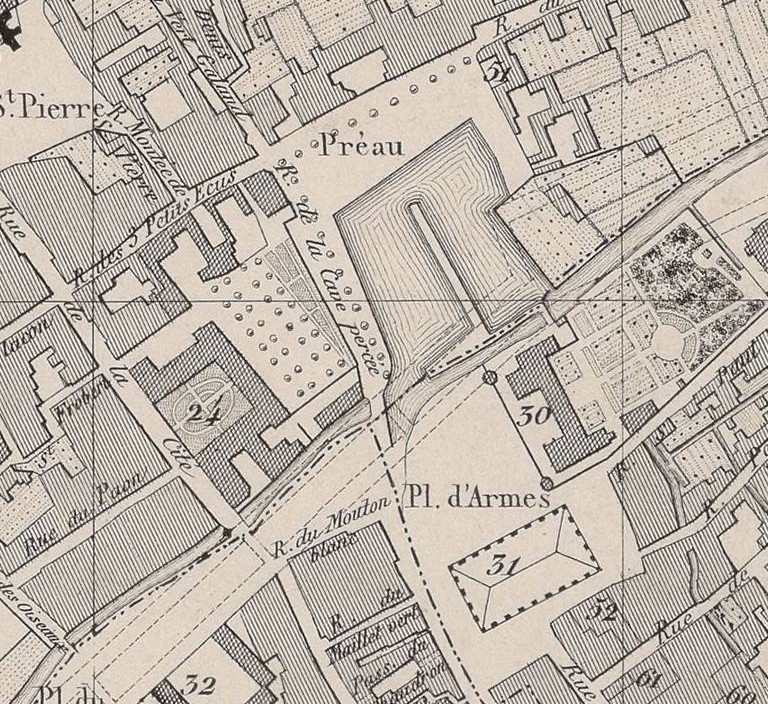
The buildings in 1839: the main courtyard (24)

=== Staff ===
Run by the Augustinian order, it had separate rooms and staff for men and women, as was customary at the time. The master was appointed and dismissed by the count, and was assisted by two or three canons of St. Stephen's chapter and its dean. For the accounts, he was assisted by one or more of the town's burghers, his brother procurator and the count's chaplain.

By the 16th century, this service had been extended to all, and the average number of patients was around forty. They were cared for by brothers and sisters, barbers and surgeons. In 1721, there were thirty beds for men and the same number for women, a number which rose to thirty-four double beds and two single beds for women, and forty double beds and six single beds for men in 1820.

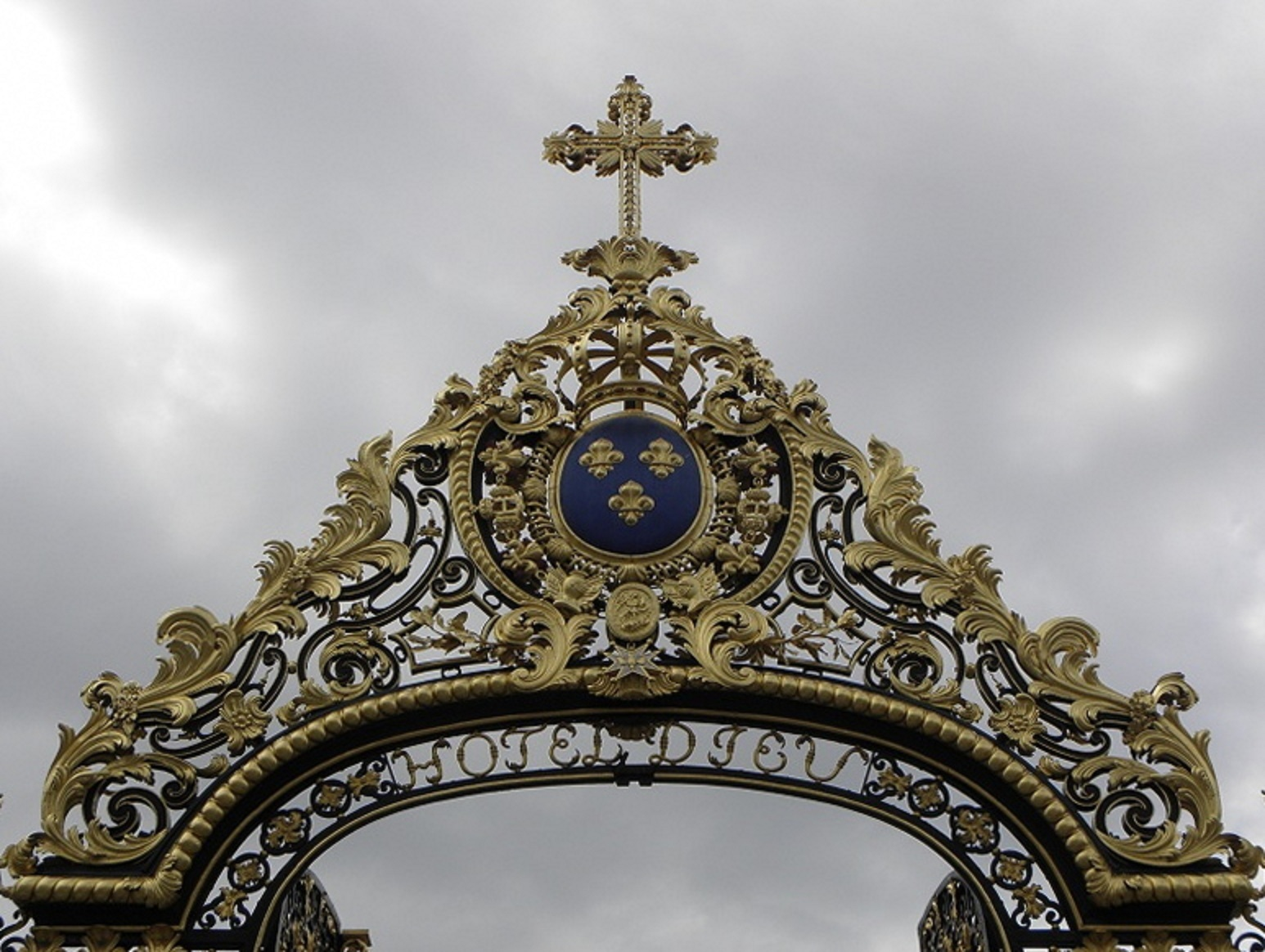
Details of the gate

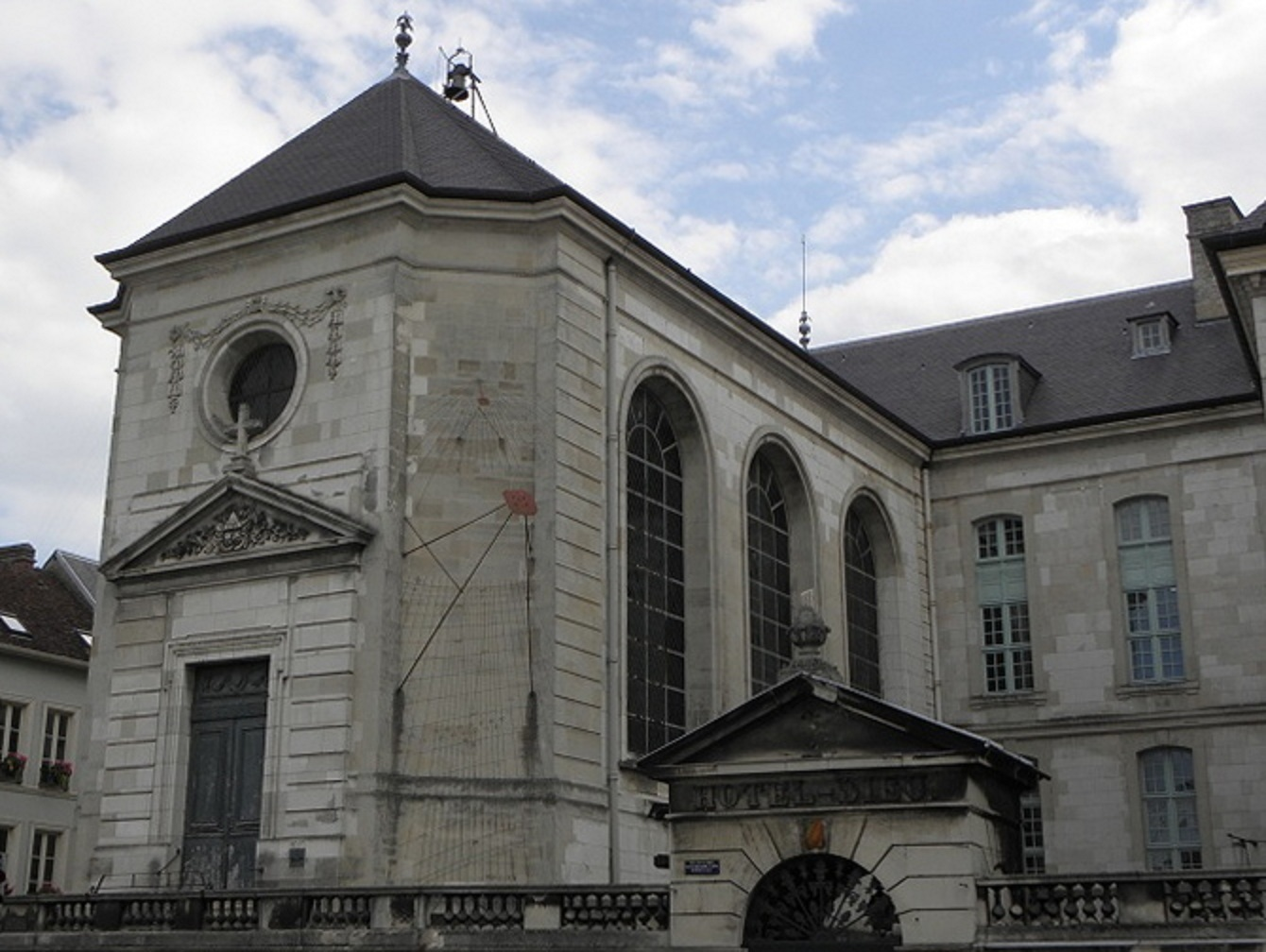
The chapel

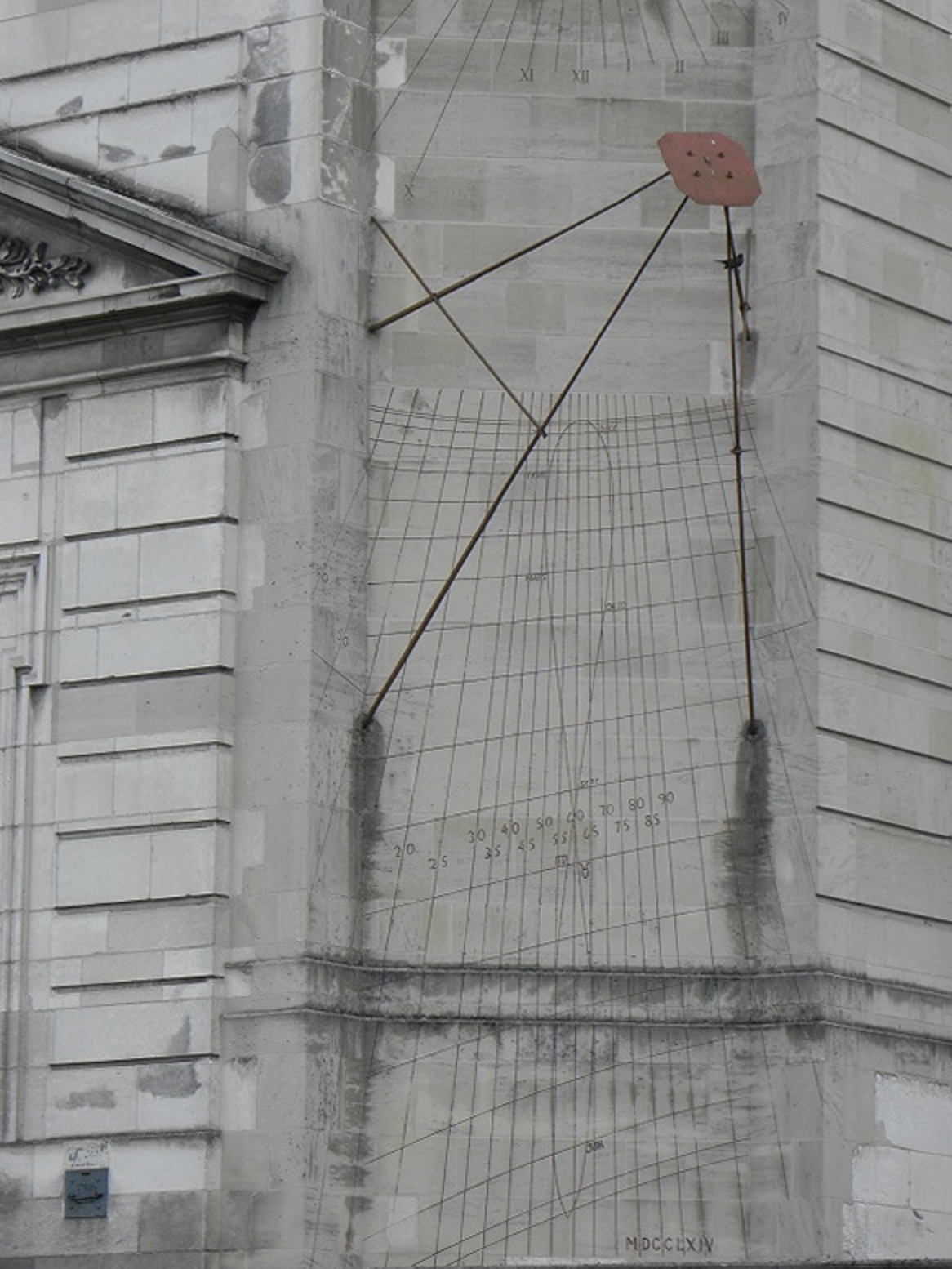
Its sundial

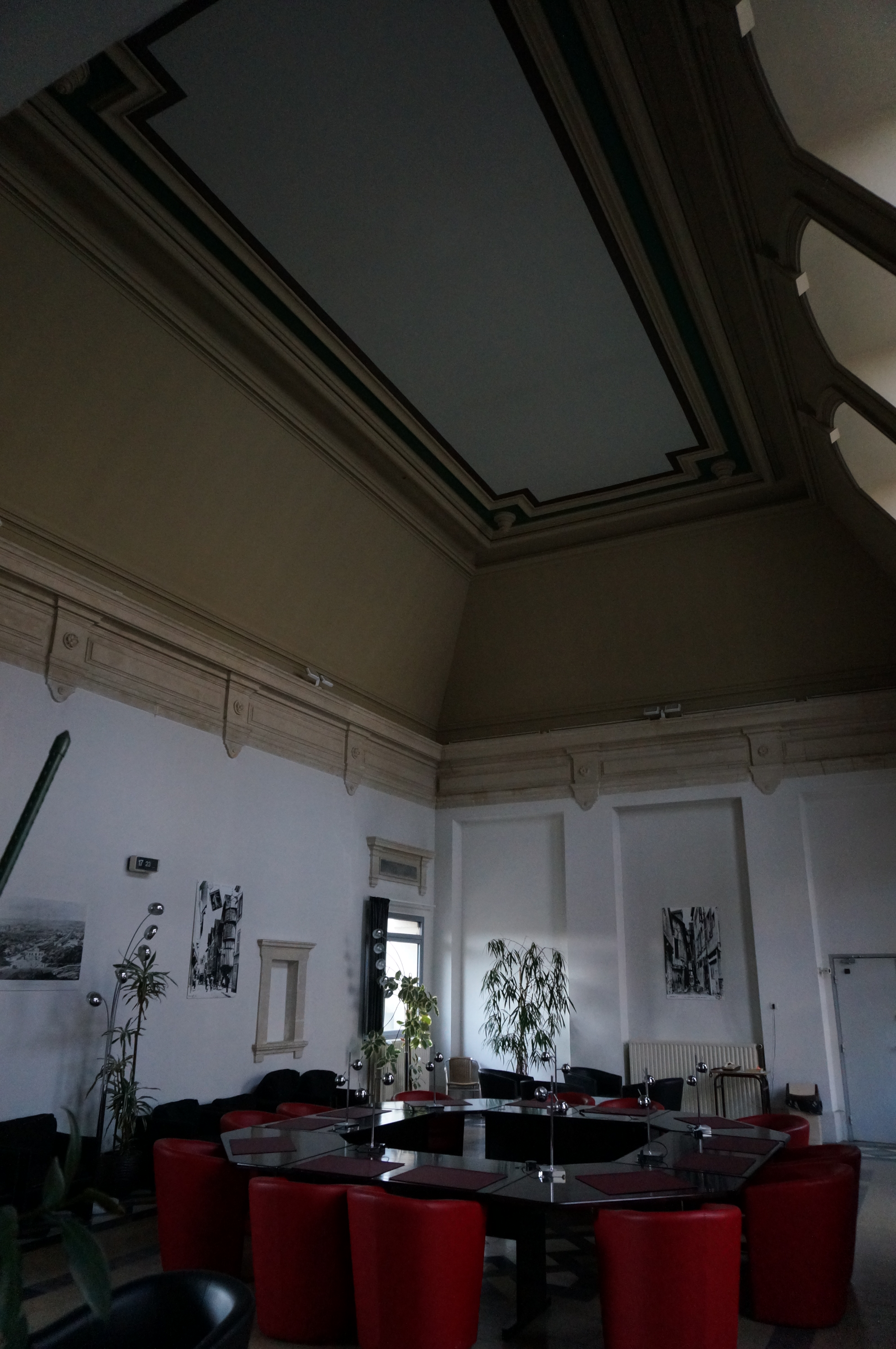
Living room

== Current uses ==
=== University of Champagne-Ardenne ===
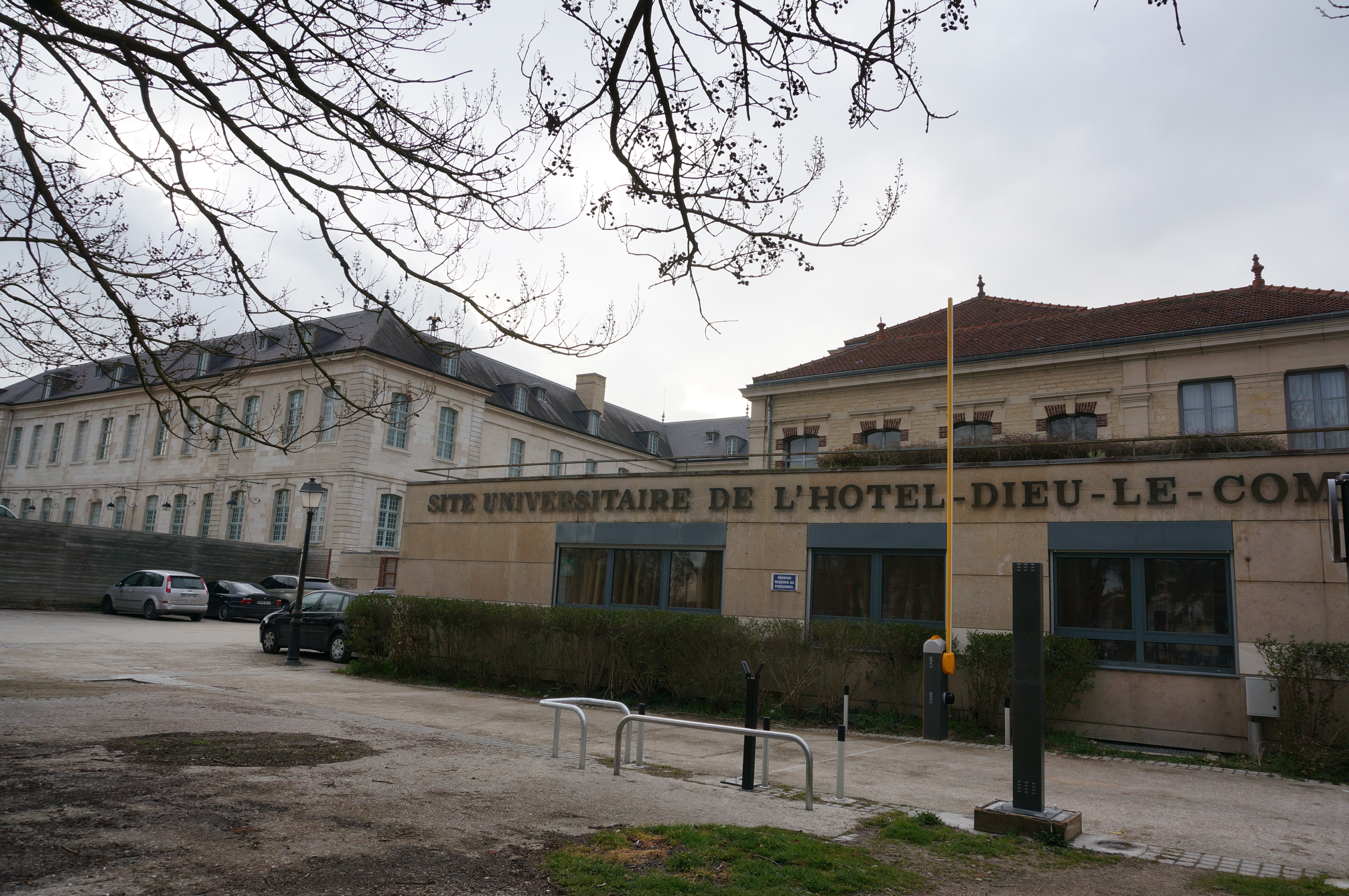
Entrance to the university campus.

Since 1992, part of the historic buildings have housed the classrooms and university library of the University of Reims Champagne-Ardenne.

=== Cité du Vitrail ===
Since June 29, 2013, the restored outbuildings of this hôtel-Dieu have housed a stained glass conservatory known as the Cité du Vitrail. The Aube department lays claim to the title of "European capital of stained glass", with a significant heritage of listed stained glass windows, representing almost 9, 000 m2 of stained glass from the 11th to the 21st century, in nearly 400 churches and monuments. This space closed its doors in December 2018 to allow work to develop on the entire site and open the "big" Cité du Vitrail at the end of 2022. The new spaces, located in the west wing of the Hôtel-Dieu-le-Comte and its chapel, will offer 3,000m2 of exhibition space, a resource center, a study center, a bookshop-boutique and a conference room.

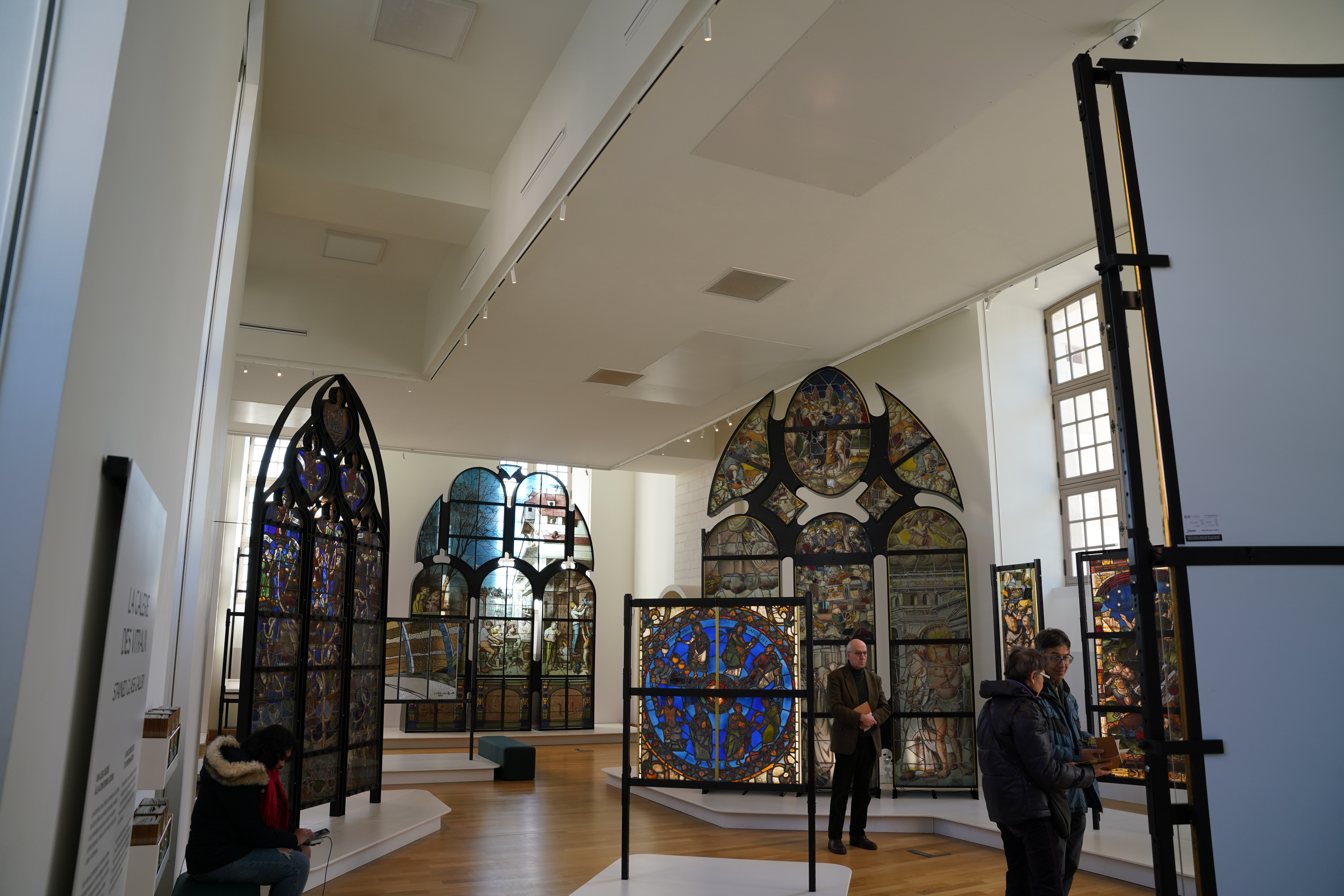
A hall of the Cité du Vitrail

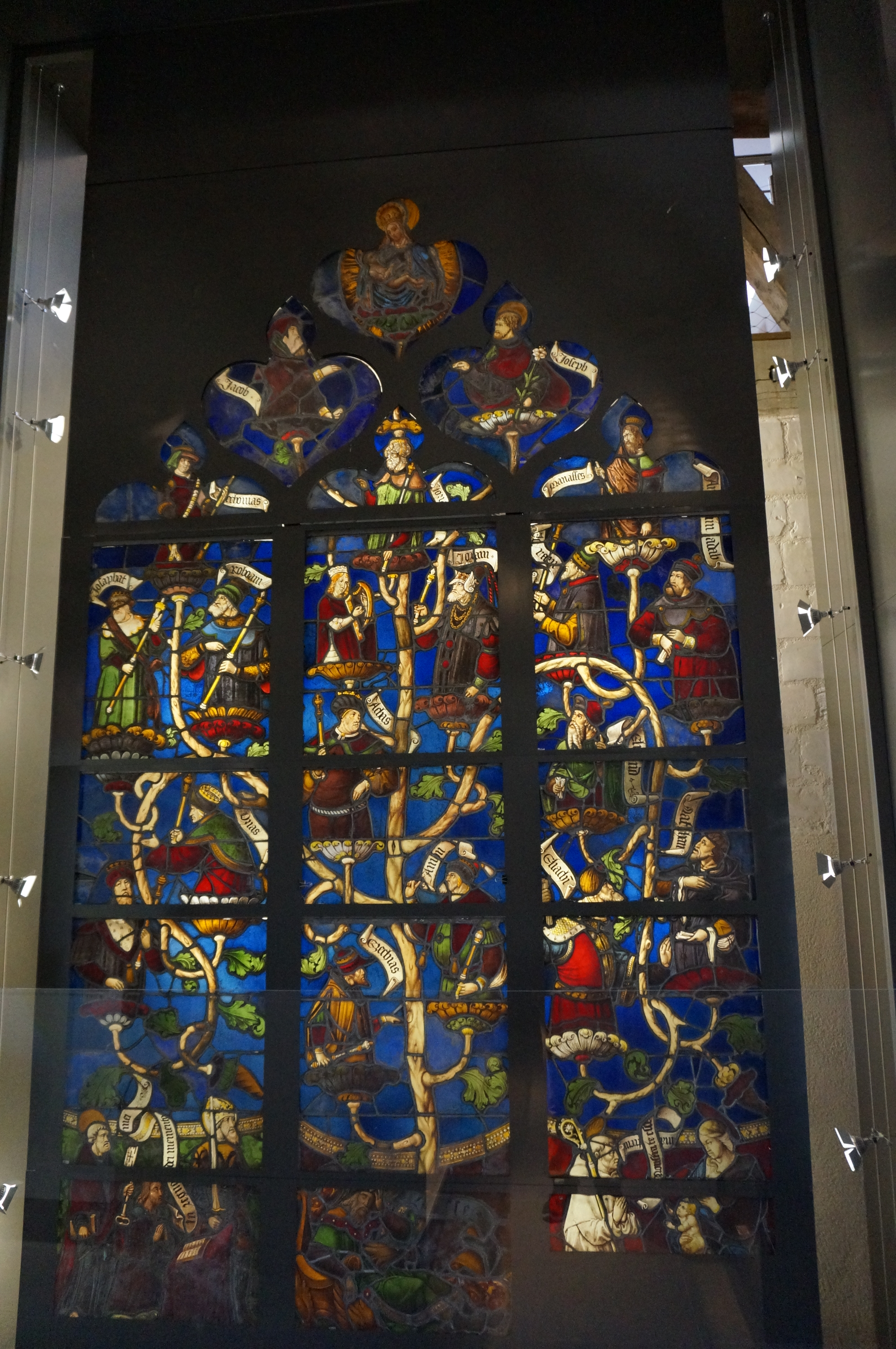
Jesse Tree at Laines-aux-Bois

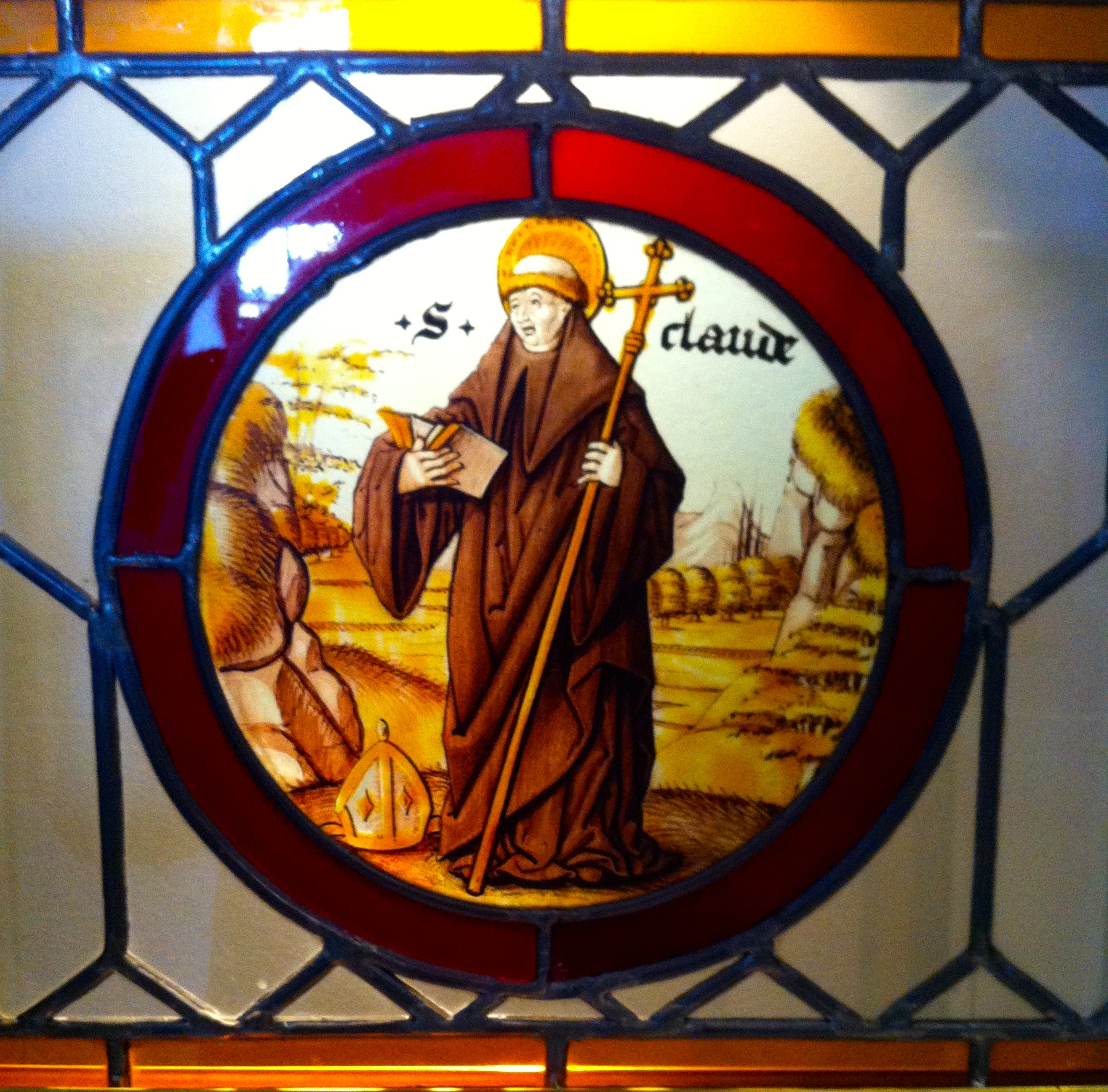
Roundel

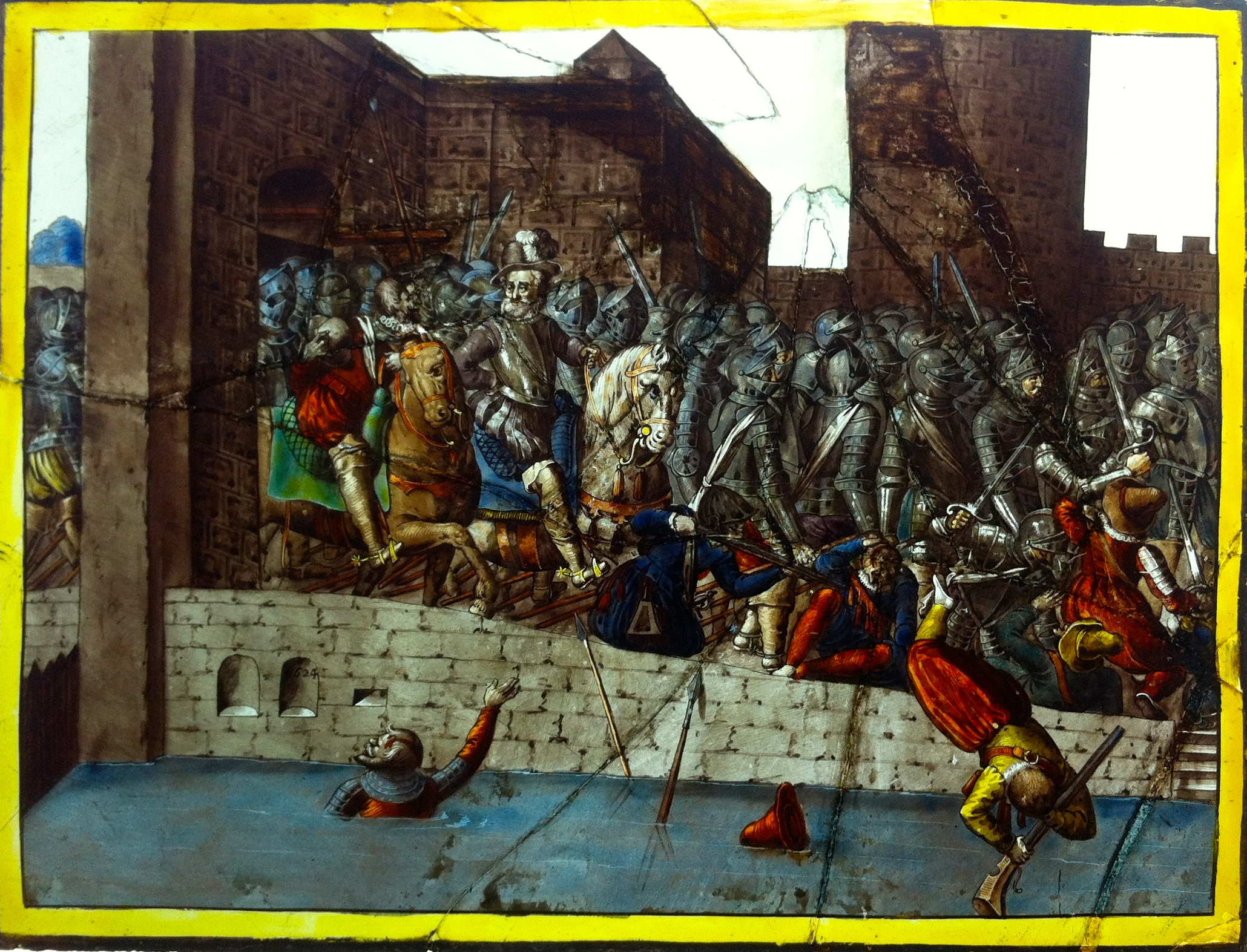
Entry of Henry IV to Paris from the Hotel de l'Arquebuse

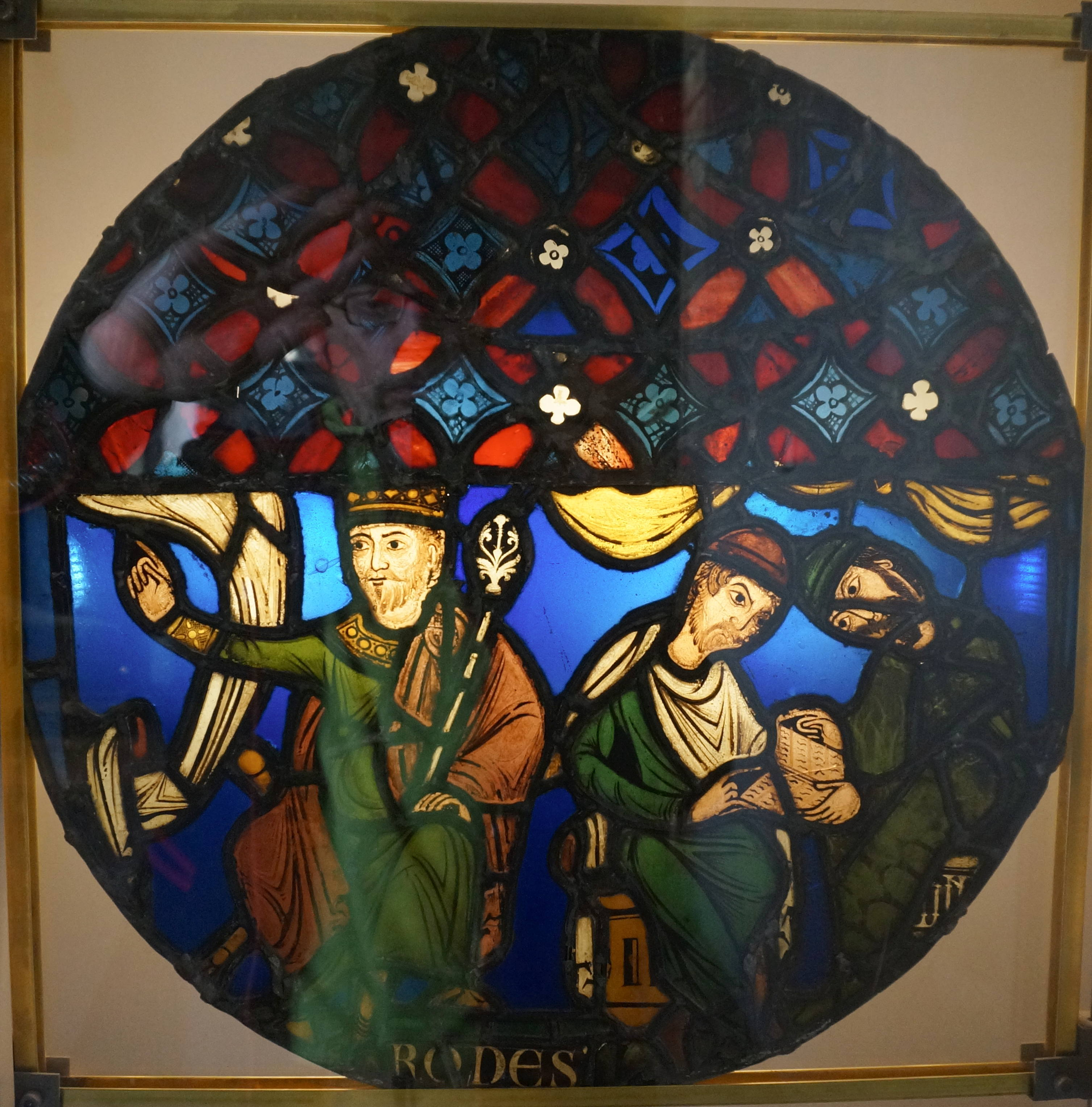
Herod and his advisors.

=== Apothecary's Museum ===
Housed in the former 18th-century apothecary, the museum's collection features objects from the hôtel-Dieu, the oldest of which date back to the 16th century. Since 2023, it has been part of the new Cité du Vitrail.

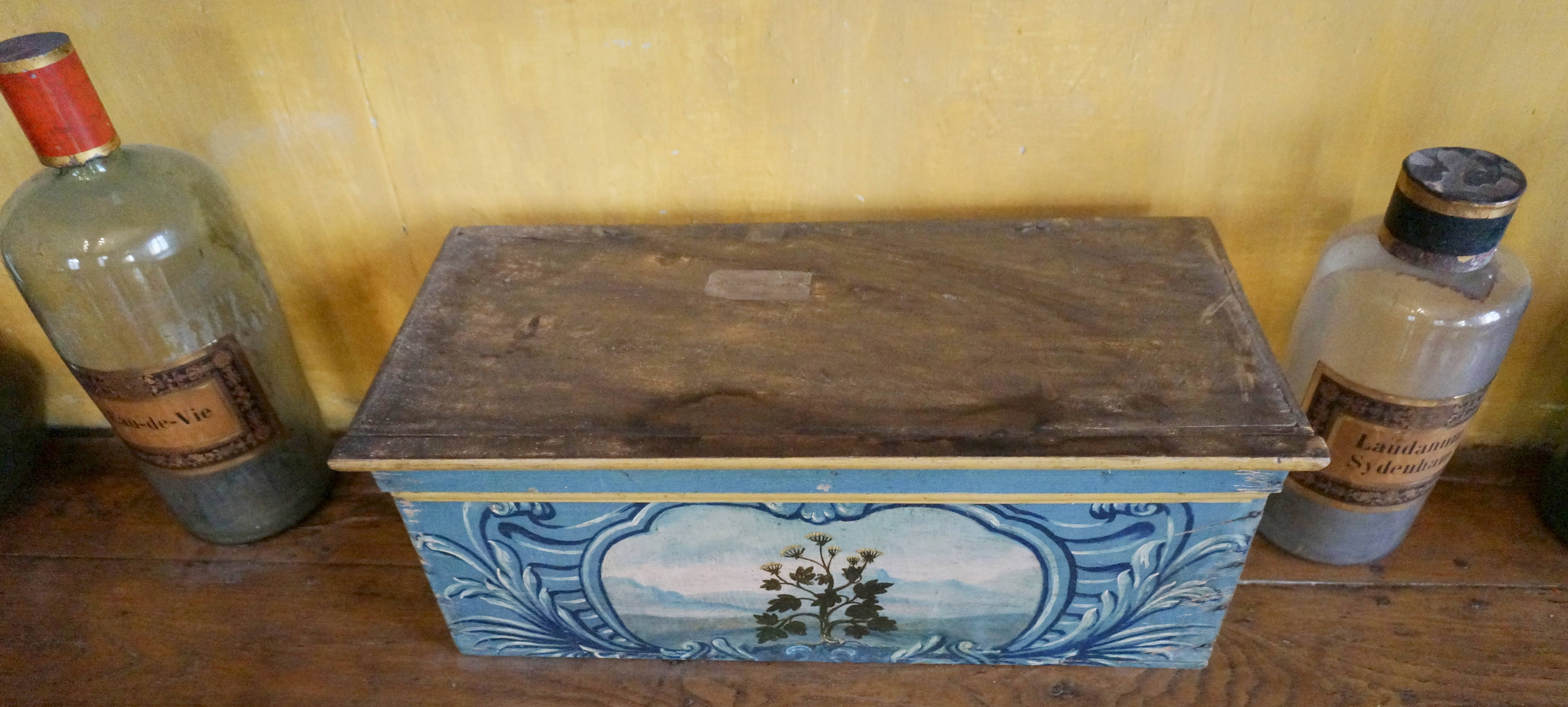
Box, bottle for ingredients

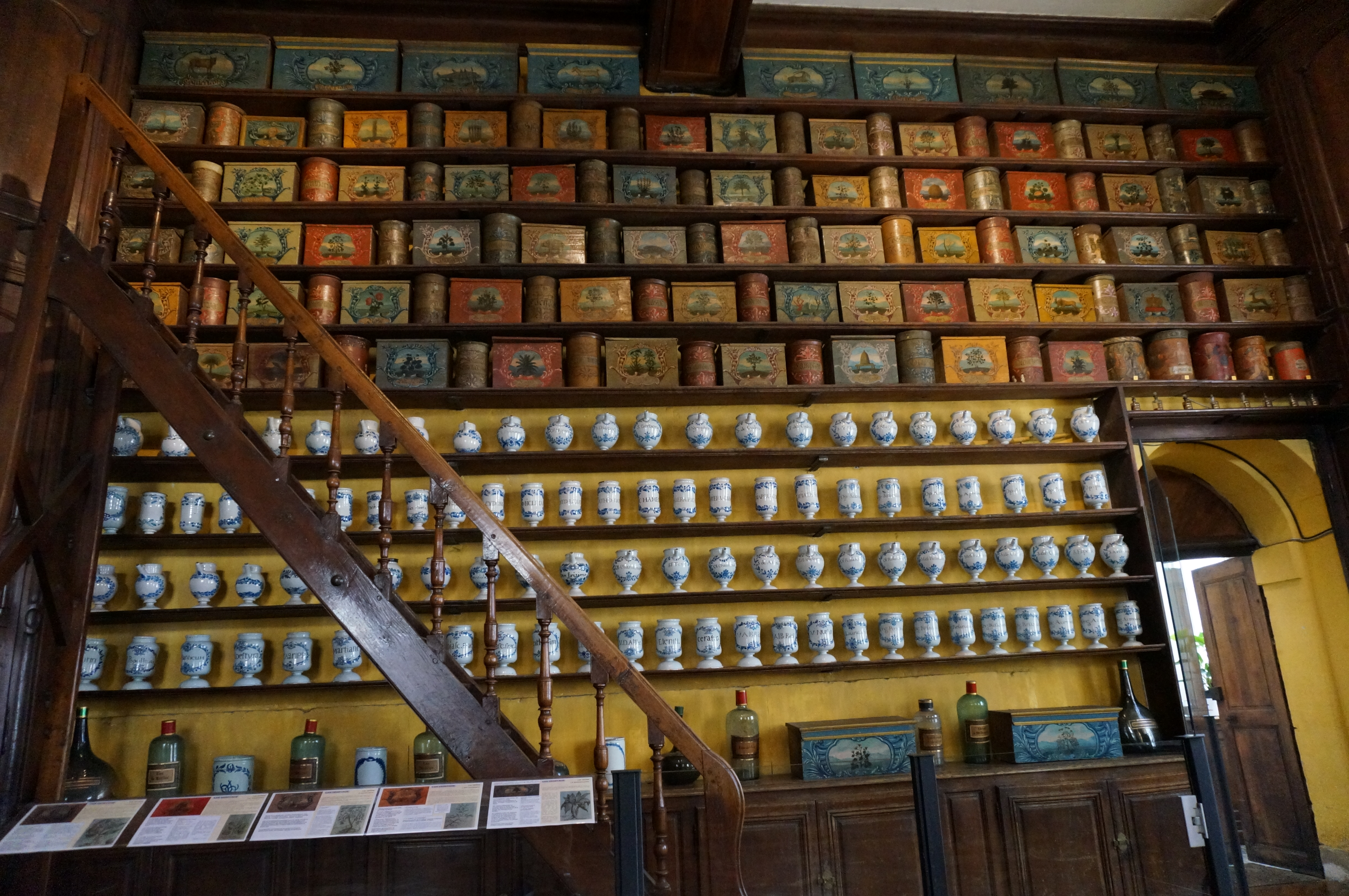
Apothecary room

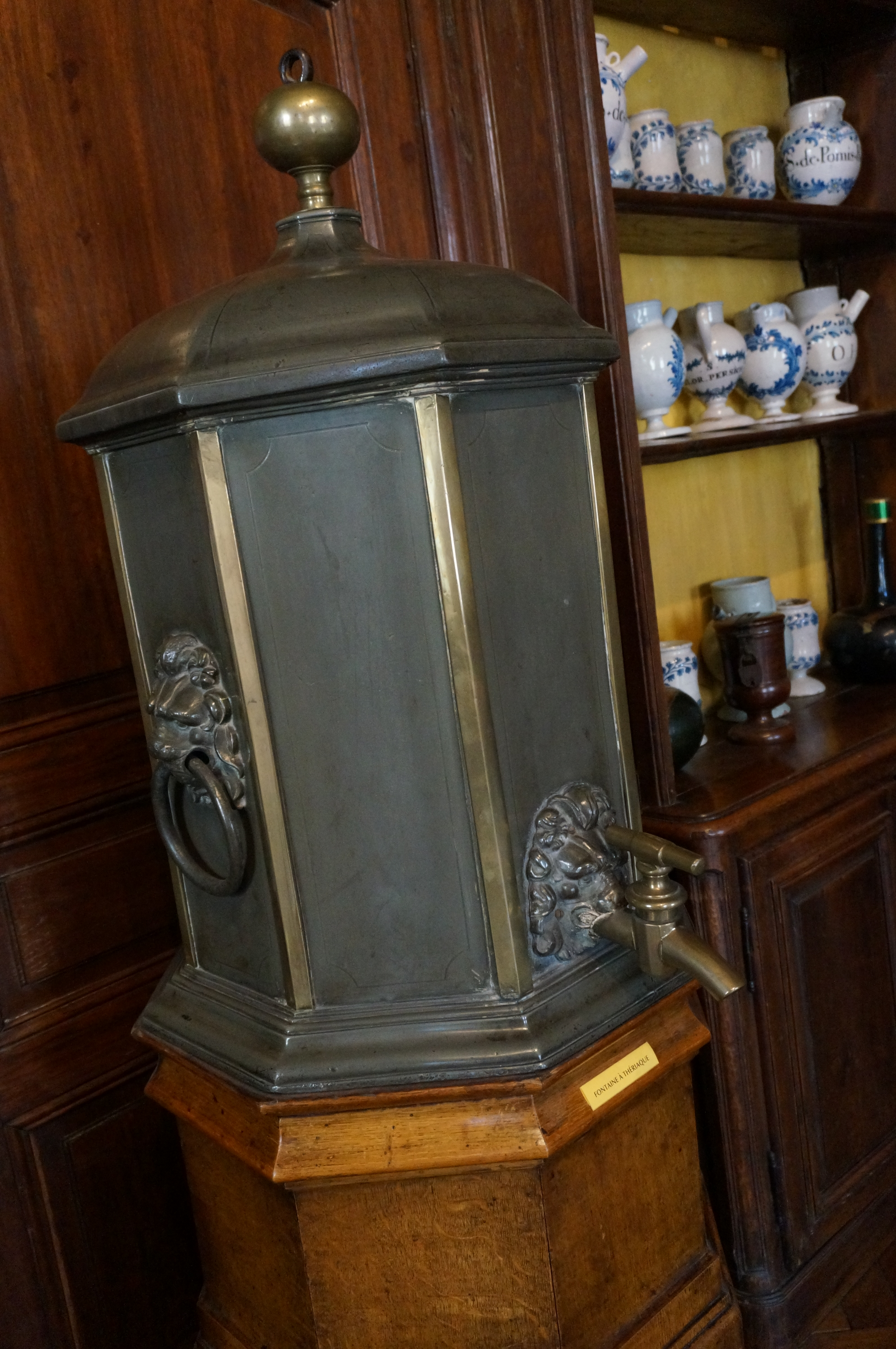
Theriac fountain

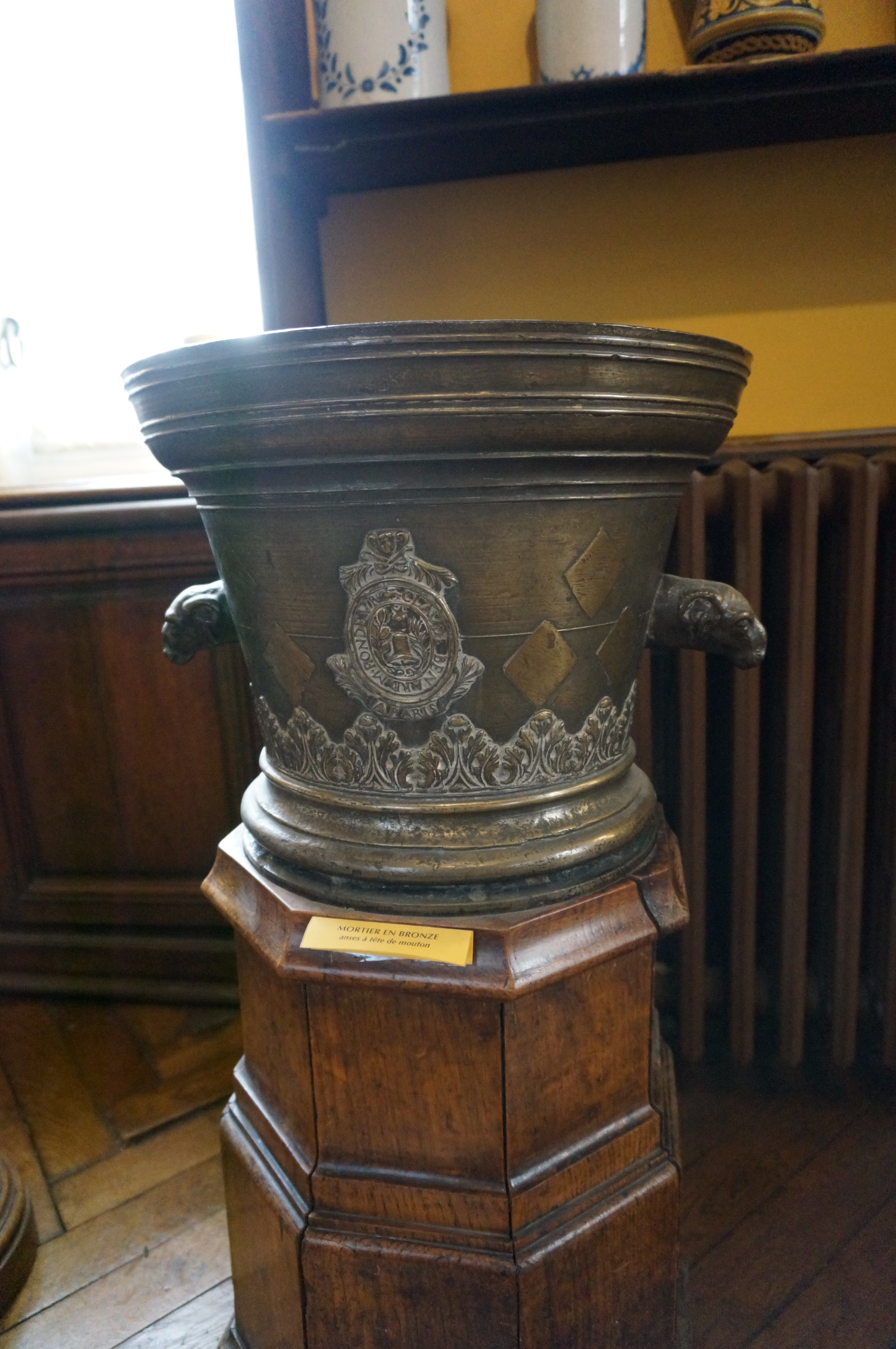
Mortar

It is organized into three rooms:

- The apothecary, where ingredients for making remedies are stored. Shelved here are 319 painted boxes (silenes) with 18th-century decoration, as well as numerous earthenware and glass containers. These include albarelles, pestles, glass flasks, etc.
- The vaulted room, once used as a laboratory. Showcases are devoted to the history of medicine and pharmacopoeia.
- A third room contains the collection of objects from the hôtel-Dieu, including several shrines and a crosier.

The museum was founded in 1976 and was located near the cathedral. It also houses the Jean-Marie Denis collection.

Since Monday May 21, 2018, and for an extended period, the apothecary of the Hôtel Dieu-le-Comte has been closed. This closure is linked to the renovation works on the west wing of the building, which is to house the future Cité du Vitrail (a project supported by the Aube department).

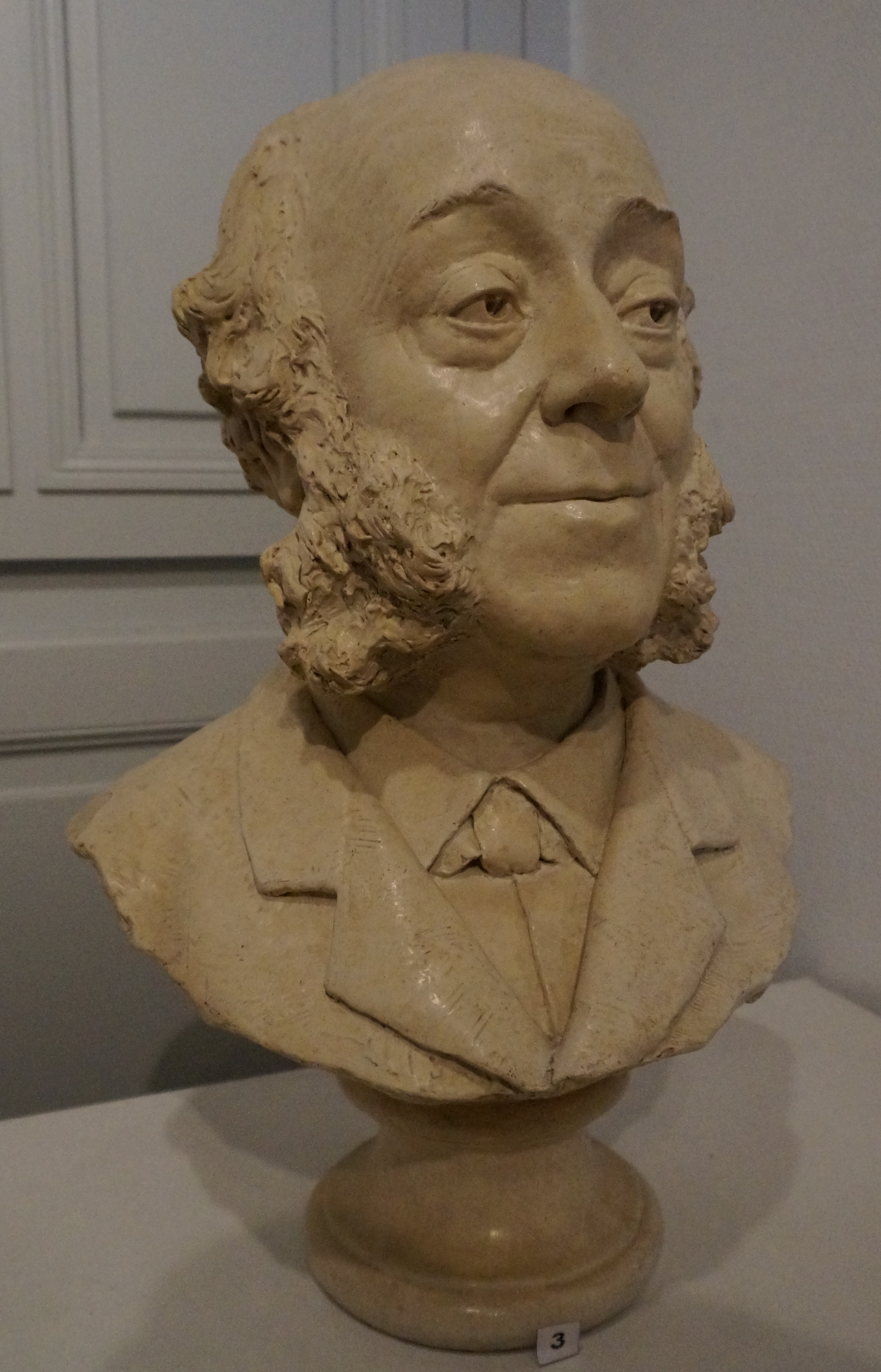
Bust of Jules Hervey

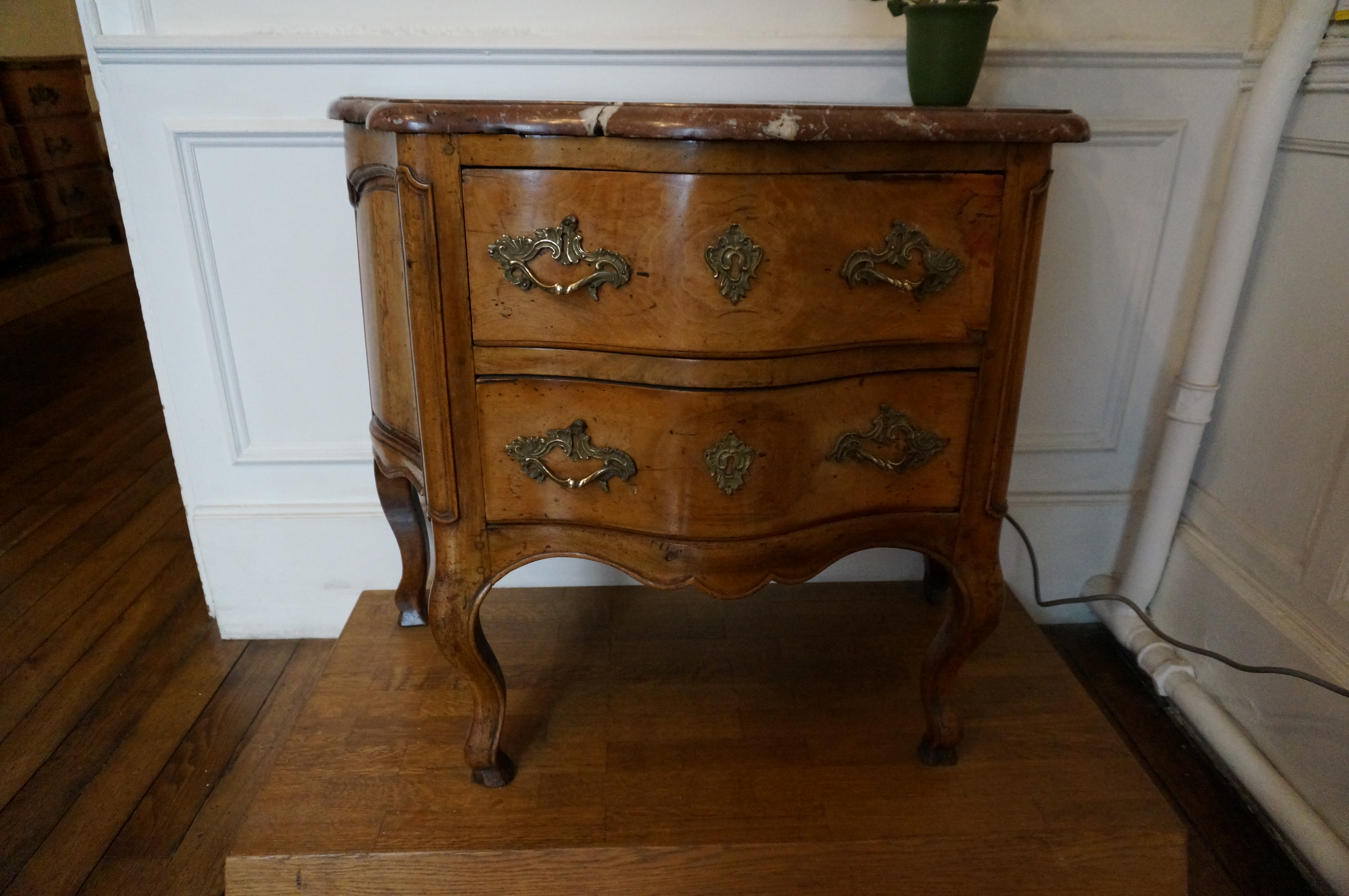
Buffet

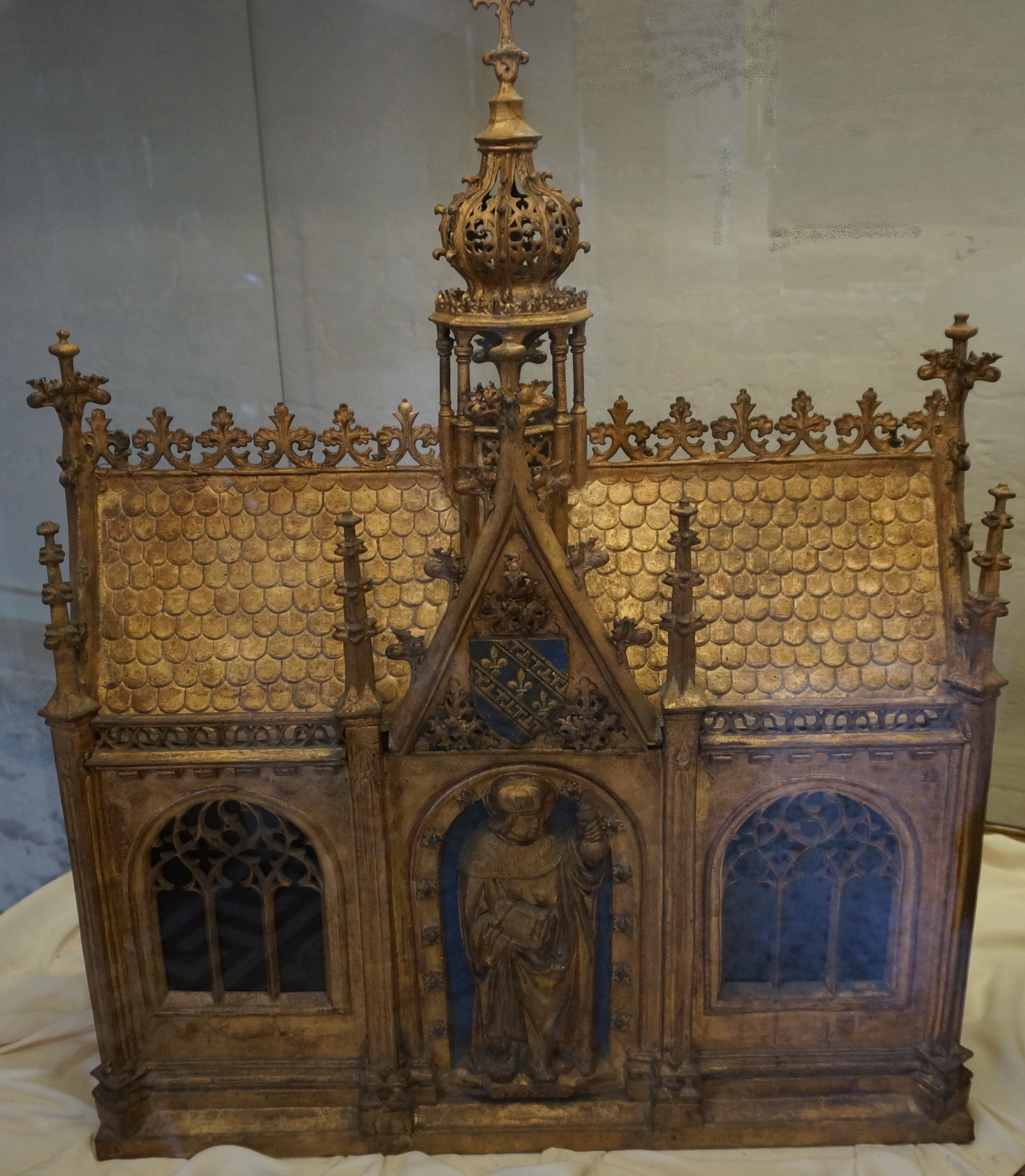
Shrine from 1520 of Saint Bartholomew

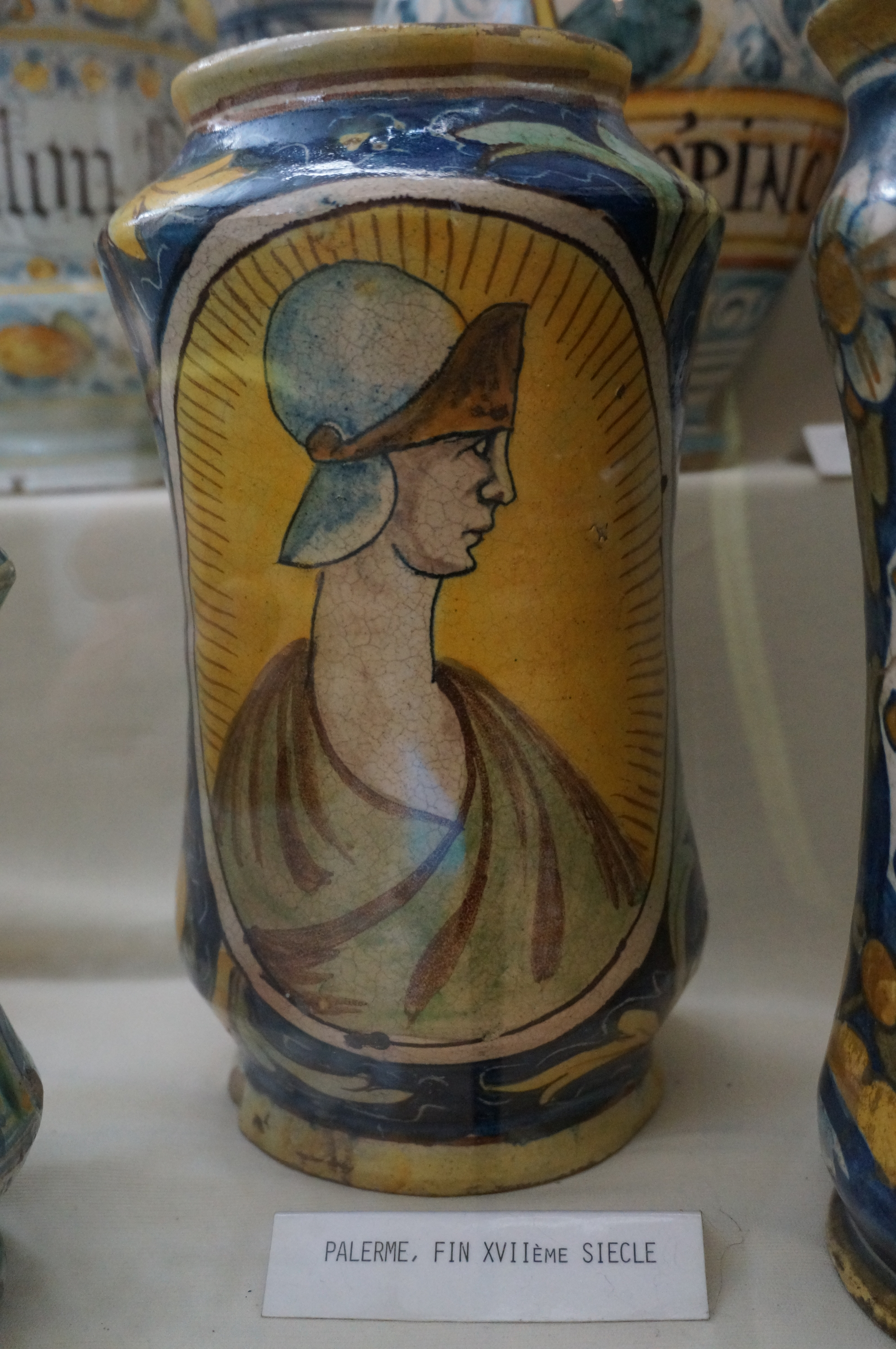
From Palermo, 18th century

=== Temporary exhibitions ===
The hôtel-Dieu now houses three temporary exhibition rooms organized by the Conseil Départemental de l'Aube.

- From the end of 2018, they hosted the ArkéAube temporary exhibition, which featured objects from the Moutot funerary complex in Lavau. This exhibition closed on September 30, 2019.
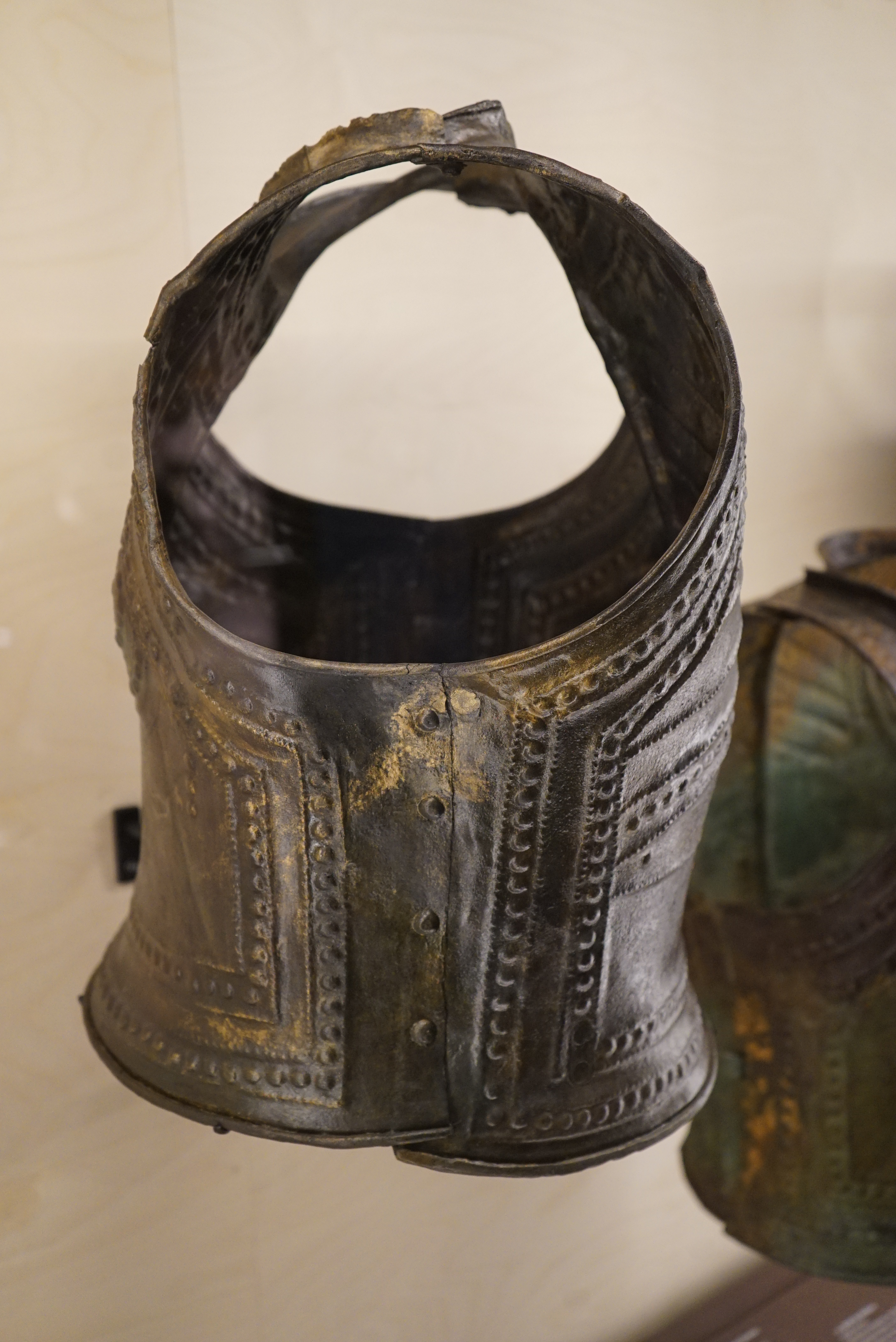
Cuirasses of Marmesse

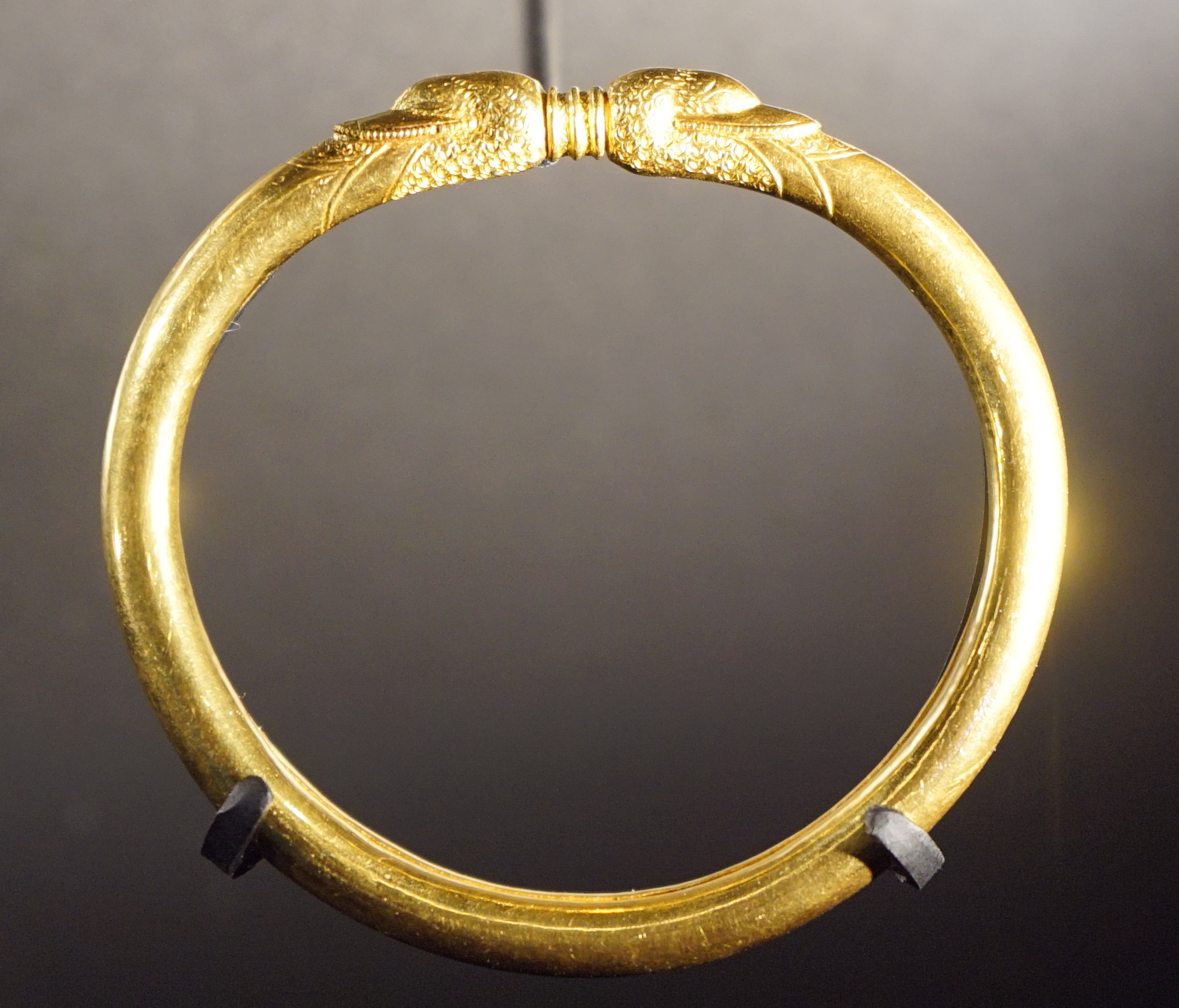
Bracelet of the Prince of Lavau

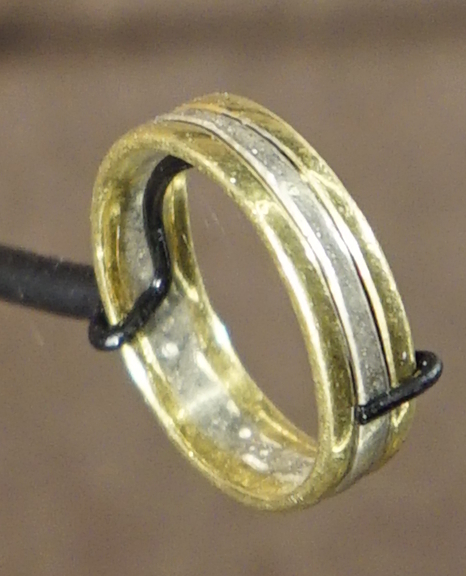
Gold ring from Barbuise

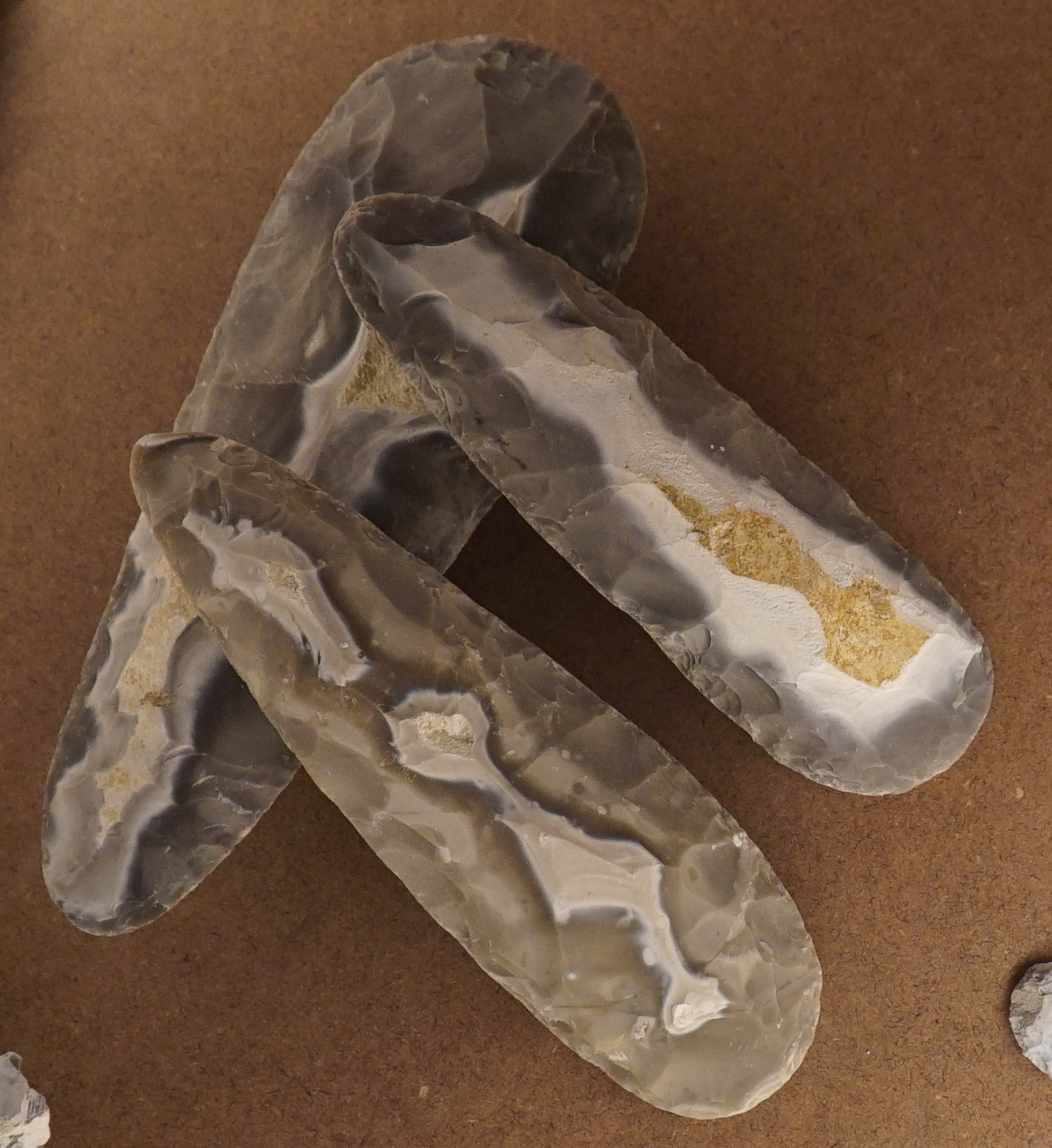
Draft of Villemaure axes
- The 2020 exhibition titled "Troyes 1420: A King for Two Crowns" focuses on the Treaty of Troyes, ratified on May 21, 1420, in Troyes.

== Bibliography ==
- Guignard, Philippe. Les Anciens Statuts de l'hôtel-Dieu le Comte de Troyes (in French).
- Barbeau, Albert. La Construction de l'hôtel-Dieu le Comte de Troyes au xvie siècle (in French). Mémoires de la Société, académique de l'Aube.
