= Marie Guenet de Saint-Ignace =

French-Canadian abbess and hospital manager (1610–1646)

Marie Guenet de Saint-Ignace (1610-1646) was a French-Canadian abbess and hospital manager. Originally from Rouen, she was the founder and manager of the convent hospital Hôtel-Dieu de Québec in Quebec in 1639. It was the oldest convent for women in Quebec, founded the same year as the Ursuline school convent by Marie de l'Incarnation - the two groups of nuns came to Canada in the same ship, which departed from Dieppe.
