= Hôtel-Dieu de Québec =

Hôtel-Dieu de Québec (Centre hospitalier universitaire de Québec)
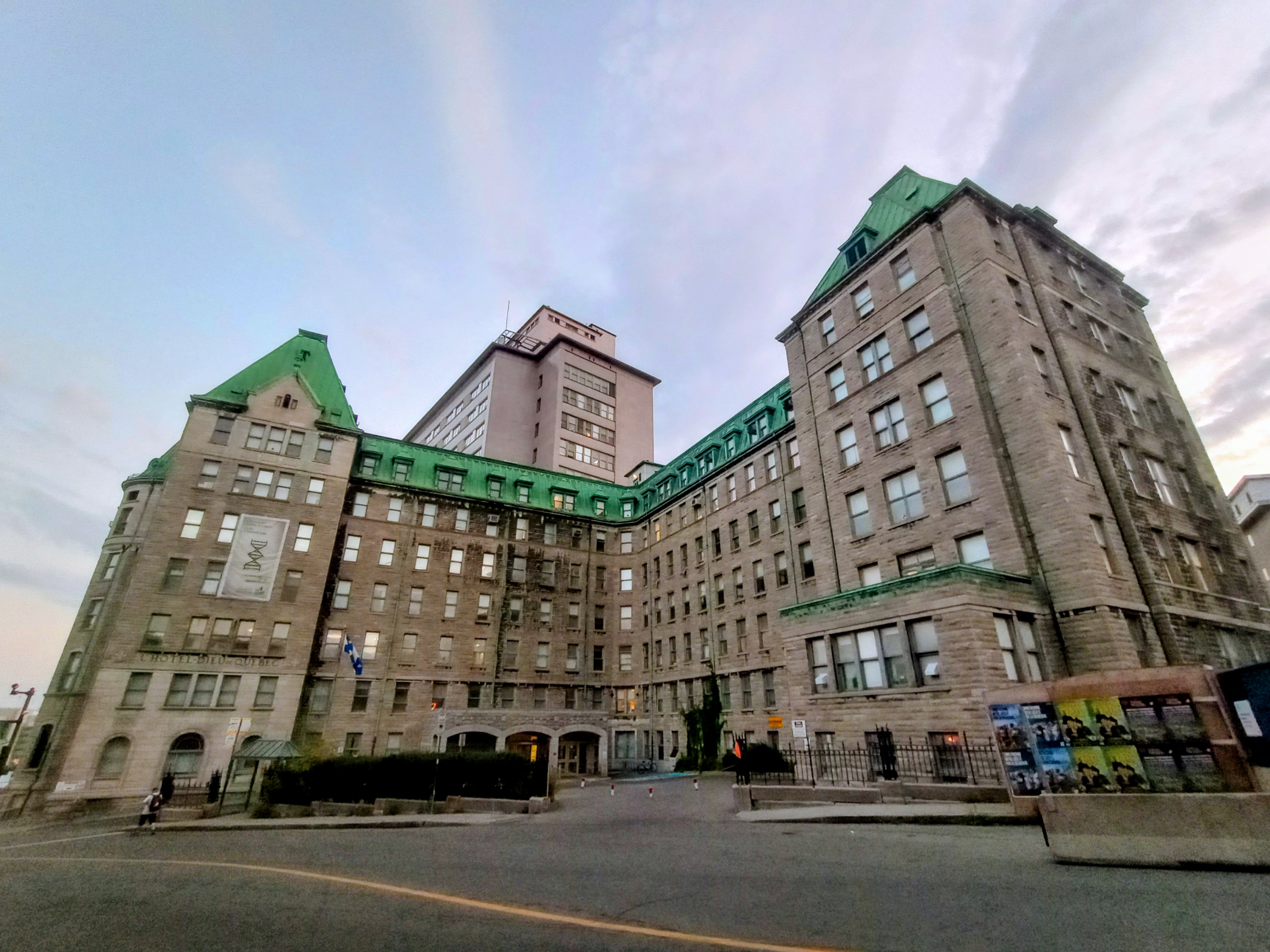
- The main entrance of the Hôtel-Dieu hospital

Geography
- Location: 11, côte du Palais; Quebec City, Quebec; G1R 2J6
- Coordinates: 46°48′54.76″N 71°12′38.26″W

Organisation
- Care system: Medicare
- Type: Teaching
- Affiliated university: Laval University

Services
- Speciality: cancer treatment, kidney disease and cochlear implants

History
- Founded: 1637

Links
- Website: www.chuq.qc.ca

National Historic Site of Canada
- Official name: Hôtel-Dieu de Québec National Historic Site of Canada
- Designated: 1936

The Hotel-Dieu de Québec (French pronunciation: [otɛl djø də kebɛk]) is a teaching hospital located in Quebec City, Quebec, Canada, and affiliated with Université Laval's medical school. It is part of the Centre hospitalier universitaire de Québec (CHUQ), a network of five teaching hospitals and several specialized institutions. Its areas of expertise include cancer treatment, kidney disease and cochlear implants. It has an affiliated research centre, the Centre de recherche de l'Hôtel-Dieu de Québec.

This hospital was the first such facility in Canada, and the first in North America, north of Mexico.

== History ==
The hospital was officially founded in 1637 in order to meet the colony's need for healthcare by Marie-Madeleine de Vignerot, the Duchesse d'Aiguillon (1604-1675), a niece of Cardinal Richelieu. She entrusted the task to the Canonesses of St. Augustine of the Mercy of Jesus, the Hospitaller Sisters, whose spiritual vocation was nursing. It is recognized as North America's earliest permanent hospital north of Mexico.

Three young canonesses left their monastery in Dieppe, on the coast of the English Channel, and arrived in New France on 1 August 1639 with the goal of opening the hospital. They were Mothers Marie de Saint-Ignace Guenet, Marie de Saint-Bonaventure Forestier and Anne de Saint-Bernard Le Cointre.

The canonesses established the hospital at its first site in 1640, in what was then the village of Sillery. In keeping with the wishes of the Duchess, their care was directed to the people of the First Nations. Dwellings were built near the hospital for the native people to facilitate their care. By 1644, however, they had to abandon the site due to repeated attacks by Iroquois warriors, and the community moved to the town of Quebec.

There the canonesses acquired the site and built the hospital that still stands. Serving the French colonists after that point, it became the leading medical institution for the care of the people of the city.

A new hospital for the poor was built in 1693 by Jean-Baptiste de Saint-Vallier, the second Bishop of Quebec, known as the Hôpital-Général de Québec. Initially four canonesses were sent to help in running the hospital. The bishop formally entrusted it to the canonesses of the Hôtel-Dieu in 1698, and the Sisters who served there became an independent monastery in 1701.

The hospital was designated a National Historic Site of Canada in 1936. The Hôtel-Dieu continued to be operated by the Augustinian canonesses until 1962.

== Description ==
The site has structures that range in date from 1695 to 2001.

The vaulted cellars that support the three-storey wings were built in 1695. Stone walls surround an adjoining Augustine cemetery, monastery, garden and cloister. Opened in 1803, the hospital chapel had its interior and façade remodelled in later years by Thomas Baillairgé.

== Bibliography ==
- Emporis: Hôpital de l'Hôtel Dieu
- Profile
