= Quebec Conference =

Quebec Conference refers to one of several different meetings by the same name that were held in Quebec City, Quebec, Canada:

- The Quebec Conference, 1864, the second conference to discuss Canada's confederation, which was finally accomplished three years later. It was here that the 72 Resolutions were drafted
- The Quebec Conference, 1943, a top-level meetings between the United States and Britain, with Canada as host, to plan strategy in 1944. It also resulted in the Quebec Agreement to share nuclear technology
- The Second Quebec Conference, held in 1944. Only the United States and the United Kingdom were represented. It is known mostly for the agreement on and the signing of the Morgenthau Plan
- The Quebec City Summit of the Americas, in 2001, which discussed the Free Trade Area of the Americas and was targeted by massive anti-globalization protests
