= George Sumner =

George Sumner may refer to:

- George Sumner (bishop of Guildford) (1824–1909)
- George R. Sumner, bishop of the Episcopal Diocese of Dallas
- George G. Sumner (1841–1906), American politician
- George W. Sumner (1841-1924), Rear Admiral in the United States Navy
- George Sumner (artist) (born 1940), American oil painter and environmental activist
- George Sumner (botanist) (1793–1855), American botanist
- Heywood Sumner (George Heywood Maunoir Sumner, 1853–1940), English painter, illustrator and craftsman
- George Holme Sumner (1760–1838), British member of parliament

== See also ==
- George Sumner House, Montreal on List of castles in Canada
- George Sumner House, Massachusetts
