= List of castles in Canada =

This is a list of castles in Canada. None of these are true castles. They are primarily country houses, follies, or other types of buildings built to give the appearance of a castle. They are usually designed in the Gothic Revival, Châteauesque, Renaissance Revival, Romanesque Revival, Scots Baronial or Tudor Revival styles.

Building	Image	Type (originally)	Architectural style	Year completed	Floor area (m^{2})	Grounds (m^{2})	Location	City	Province
Alfred Brown House		Mansion	Tudor Revival	1874	1,556	26,255	45.439106°N 73.765531°W	Dorval	Quebec
Alice Graham Hallward House		Mansion	Tudor Revival	1925	1,787	1,411	45.501556°N 73.582111°W	Montreal	Quebec
Andrew Frederick Gault House		Mansion	Gothic Revival	1875 (destroyed in 1924)			45.499583°N 73.579167°W	Montreal	Quebec
Ardvarna		Mansion	Queen Anne Revival	1894	1,253	4,631	45.50425°N 73.581861°W	Montreal	Quebec
Banff Springs Hotel		Hotel	Châteauesque	1888	13,940		51.1644°N 115.562°W	Banff	Alberta
Braehead		Mansion	Gothic Revival	1862	2,053	13,123	45.504931°N 73.581125°W	Montreal	Quebec
Cary Castle		Official residence	Châteauesque	1860 (destroyed in 1899)				Victoria	British Columbia
Casa Loma		Mansion	Gothic Revival	1914	6,011	31,889	43.67815°N 79.409456°W	Toronto	Ontario
Castle Kilbride		Mansion	Italianate	1877	929		43.403972°N 80.671518°W	Wilmot	Ontario
Château Bickerdike		Mansion	Châteauesque	1880			45.4378028°N 73.708484°W	Lachine	Québec
Château de Callière		Hôtel particulier	French Colonial	1695 (ruins)			45.50256°N 73.55422°W	Montreal	Quebec
Château Dufresne		Mansions	Beaux-Arts	1918	1,809	7,134	45.553885°N 73.553818°W	Montreal	Quebec
Château Frontenac		Hotel	Châteauesque	1893	69,956	10,195	46.811846°N 71.205343°W	Quebec City	Quebec
Château Haldimand		Castle	Colonial	1786 (ruins)			46.812278°N 71.205014°W	Quebec City	Quebec
Château Laurier		Hotel	Châteauesque	1912	61,316		45.425567°N 75.695108°W	Ottawa	Ontario
Château Monsarrat		Mansion	Tudor Revival	1930		2,324	45.42°N 75.76019°W	Gatineau	Quebec
Château de Ramezay		Official residence	French Colonial	1706 (reconstructed in 1756-57)	1,704	1,422	45.509028°N 73.553333°W	Montreal	Quebec
Chateau St. Antoine		Mansion	Mauresque	1897		12,820	45.7777559°N 73.1754096°W	Saint-Antoine-sur-Richelieu	Quebec
Chateau St. Louis		Official residence	Palladian	1620 (ruins)			46.812423°N 71.204396°W	Quebec City	Quebec
Château de Vaudreuil		Hôtel particulier	French colonial	1676 (ruins)			45.507694°N 73.552653°W	Montreal	Quebec
Charles A. Smart House		Mansion	Tudor Revival	1910	1,804	5,779	45.490681°N 73.6037°W	Westmount	Québec
Chelster Hall		Mansion	Tudor Revival	2006	4,366.44	40,468.56	43.457153°N 79.653225°W	Oakville	Ontario
Chorley Park		Official residence	Châteauesque	1915 (destroyed in 1961)		56,656	43.686054°N 79.370009°W	Toronto	Ontario
Confederation Building		Office building	Châteauesque	1931			45.421905°N 75.702871°W	Ottawa	Ontario
Craguie		Mansion	Romanesque Revival, Châteauesque	1889 (destroyed in 1930)			45.502878°N 73.582133°W	Montreal	Quebec
Craigdarroch Castle		Mansion	Scottish baronial style	1890	2,300	113,000	48.422585°N 123.343704°W	Victoria	British Columbia
Delta Bessborough		Hotel	Châteauesque	1932			52.126389°N 106.659167°W	Saskatoon	Saskatchewan
Dundurn Castle		Mansion	Neoclassical	1835	1,332	40,469	43.2695°N 79.8847°W	Hamilton	Ontario
Elspeh Angus and Duncan McIntyre Houses		Mansions	Renaissance Revival	1894	2,304	29,314	45.503778°N 73.581028°W	Montreal	Quebec
Empress Hotel		Hotel	Châteauesque	1908			48.421806°N 123.367287°W	Victoria	British Columbia
Euclid Hall		Mansion	Gothic Revival	1868			43.666832°N 79.377943°W	Toronto	Ontario
Fred Sowden House		Mansion	Gothic Revival	1911			49.6162°N 100.256°W	Souris	Manitoba
George Alexander Drummond House		Mansion	Romanesque Revival	1888 (destroyed in 1926)			45.5025°N 73.575556°W	Montreal	Quebec
George Elias Tuckett House		Mansion	Romanesque Revival	1895			43.258989°N 79.879261°W	Hamilton	Ontario
George Stephen House		Mansion	Renaissance Revival	1883	2,555	2,206	45.499025°N 73.575761°W	Montreal	Quebec
George Sumner House		Mansion	Queen-Anne	1906	1,103	4,831	45.492042°N 73.6005°W	Westmount	Quebec
Hatley Castle		Mansion	Scottish baronial style	1909	4,063.73	2,286,474	48.4343°N 123.4724°W	Colwood	British Columbia
Harrieth Frothingham House		Mansion	Tudor Revival	1916	1,827	3,510	45.49175°N 73.616167°W	Westmount	Quebec
Health and Welfare Building		Government building	Châteauesque	1940	8,915.4	2,422.40	46.817727°N 71.213272°W	Quebec City	Quebec
Hotel Macdonald		Hotel	Châteauesque	1915			53.5402°N 113.489°W	Edmonton	Alberta
James Ross House		Mansion	Châteauesque	1892	2,390	29,314	45.503389°N 73.580306°W	Montreal	Quebec
James T. Davis House		Mansion	Tudor Revival	1910	1,858	3,122	45.502292°N 73.582681°W	Montreal	Quebec
Le Château Apartments		Apartment building	Châteauesque	1925	29,973	6,279	45.4995°N 73.579264°W	Montreal	Quebec
Les Fusiliers Mont-Royal		Drill hall	Châteauesque	1911	1,613	1,688	45.517989°N 73.572314°W	Montreal	Quebec
Louis Joseph Forget House (Bois de la Roche)		Mansion	Châteauesque	1900	2,146	87,723	45.445625°N 73.959486°W	Senneville	Québec
Maison Gomin		Prison	Châteauesque	1931		16,835	46.787306°N 71.259917°W	Quebec City	Quebec
Manoir Bleury-Bouthillier		Mansion	Châteauesque	1887	3,251.61	10,219.33	45.621306°N 73.802444°W	Rosemère	Quebec
Manoir Mauvide-Genest		Manor	French Colonial	1734			46.914126°N 70.902678°W	Saint-Jean-de-l'Île-d'Orléans	Quebec
Manoir Papineau		Manor	Regency	1850		45,370	45.646047°N 74.945725°W	Montebello	Québec
Manoir Richelieu		Hotel	Châteauesque	1929			47.620583°N 70.145656°W	La Malbaie	Quebec
Manoir Rouville-Campbell		Manor	Tudor Revival	1860		18,610	45.560083°N 73.200306°W	Mont-Saint-Hilaire	Québec
Manoir Taschereau		Manor	Palladian	1811		5,039	46.444498°N 71.033869°W	Sainte-Marie	Quebec
McTavish reservoir		Reservoir	Châteauesque	1932	2,541	37,477	45.505529°N 73.578777°W	Montreal	Quebec
Middlesex County Court House (London, Ontario)		Court House	Gothic Revival	1829		16,000	42.982108°N 81.254347°W	London	Ontario
Mile End City Hall & Fire station		City Hall and Fire station	Châteauesque	1905	1,939	960	45.523°N 73.593292°W	Montreal	Quebec
Oaklands		Mansion	Gothic Revival	1860			43.681986°N 79.398847°W	Toronto	Ontario
Oland House		Mansion	Romanesque Revival	1891			44.632903°N 63.575594°W	Halifax	Nova Scotia
Place Viger		Hotel & railway station	Châteauesque	1898	10,219	38,317	45.512556°N 73.553417°W	Montreal	Quebec
Quebec City Armoury		Drill hall	Châteauesque	1887 (destroyed in 2008)			46.8063°N 71.214°W	Quebec City	Quebec
Ravenscrag		Mansion	Renaissance Revival	1863	4,968	139,930	45.505889°N 73.582111°W	Montreal	Quebec
Richard Bladworth Angus House		Mansion	Châteauesque	c. 1903 (destroyed in 1950)			45.436583°N 73.970875°W	Senneville	Quebec
Rideau Hall		Official residence	Regency, Norman Revival, Florentine Renaissance Revival	1838	9,500	356,123	45.443753°N 75.685641°W	Ottawa	Ontario
Saint George Manor		Mansion	French Renaissance Revival	2013	2,323		43.5415333°N 79.643088°W	Mississauga	Ontario
Terrace Bank		Mansion	Gothic Revival	1861 (destroyed in 1909)			45.500583°N 73.583194°W	Montreal	Quebec
The Embassy (Mansion)		Mansion	Beaux-Arts	2019	3,252		43.7346111°N 79.374163°W	Toronto	Ontario
Trafalgar Apartments		Apartment building	Châteauesque	1931	15,721	2,801	45.494922°N 73.594984°W	Montreal	Quebec
Wesley Hall		University building	Châteauesque	1895			49.890889°N 97.153375°W	Winnipeg	Manitoba
Willistead Manor		Manor	Tudor Revival	1906		62,000	42.318222°N 83.010472°W	Windsor	Ontario

== See also ==
- List of castles

== Sources ==
- Bart Robinson, "Banff Springs: The story of the hotel", Banff, Summerthought Publishing, 2007, 178 p.
- (in French) Communauté Urbaine de Montréal, Répertoire d'architecture traditionnelle sur le territoire de la Communauté Urbaine de Montréal : Les appartements, Service de la planification du territoire (CUM), 1987, 455 p.
- (in French) Communauté Urbaine de Montréal, Répertoire d'architecture traditionnelle sur le territoire de la Communauté Urbaine de Montréal : Les édifices publics, Service de la planification du territoire (CUM), 1987, 309 p.
- (in French) Communauté Urbaine de Montréal, Répertoire d'architecture traditionnelle sur le territoire de la Communauté Urbaine de Montréal : Les résidences, Service de la planification du territoire (CUM), 1987, 803 p.
- "Canadian Landmark Hotel Saves Time and Money with Metasys : Château Frontenac", Milwaukee, Johnson Controls, Inc., 2000, 2 p.
- CIty of Gatineau, The assessment roll (retrieved December 1, 2013)
- City of Montebello, The assessment roll (retrieved November 28, 2013)
- City of Montreal, The assessment roll (retrieved February 6, 2014)
- City of Mont-Saint-Hilaire, The assessment roll (retrieved November 28, 2013)
- City of Sainte-Marie, The assessment roll (retrieved November 28, 2013)
- "Future Options for Casa Loma", Toronto, Casa Loma Corporation, 2012, 115 p., p. 13
- Historic Sites and Monuments Board of Canada, Canada's Castles, National Historic Sites of Canada (retrieved October 19, 2013)
- (in French) L'école de fouilles archéologique de Pointe-à-Callière, Château de Callière, Pointe-à-Callière (retrieved Octobre 19th, 2013)
- Luxury Residence The Saint George Manor in Mississauga is for sale, Luxury Branded Corporation, October 4, 2021.
- Maria Cook, "The heart and soul of a hotel", Ottawa Citizen, June 5, 2012.
- McGill University, Square Mile Mansions, Canadian Architecture Collection (retrieved October 19, 2013)
- Quebec City, The assessment roll (retrieved November 28, 2013)
- Roderick Macleod, "The Road to Terrace Bank: Land Capitalization, Public Space, and the Redpath Family Home, 1837-1861", Erudit, 2003.
- Royal Roads University Archives, Hatley Castle Plans (retrieved February 13, 2014)
- (in French) Simon Diotte, "La vie de château à Rosemère (Manoir Bleury-Bouthillier)", La Presse, May 25, 2006
