= Operation Jupiter (Norway) =

WWII military operation plan

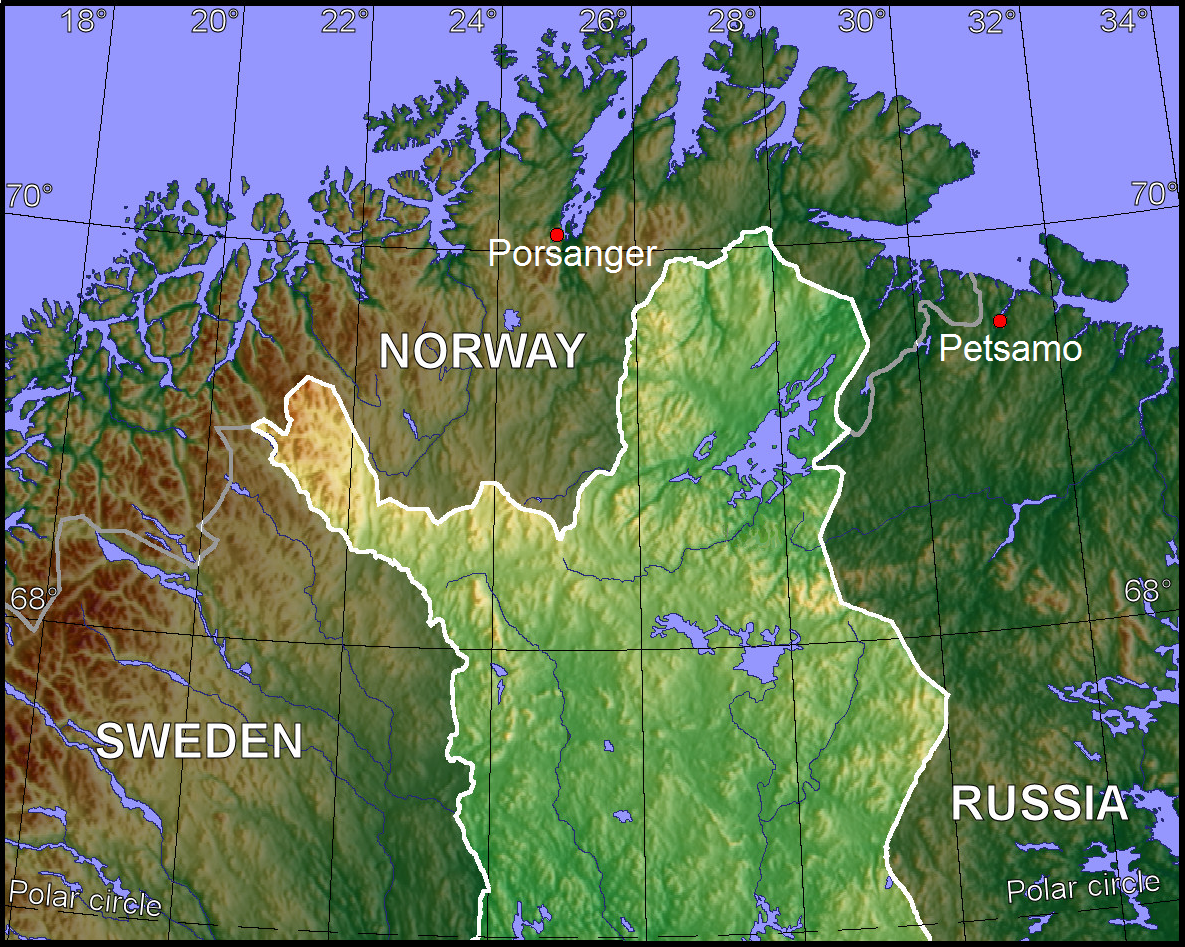
- The German airfields at Petsamo (Finland) and Porsanger (Norway), the objectives of the May 1942 plan for Operation Jupiter. Note that the post-1947 national borders are shown.
- Type: Amphibious assault
- Location: Occupied Norway; 69°40′N 19°00′E
- Planned by: British Armed Forces
- Objective: To protect Arctic convoys and liberate Norway from German occupation
- Outcome: Plan abandoned in 1944

Operation Jupiter was a plan originating in 1941 for an invasion of northern Norway and Finland by Allied forces during the Second World War. The first versions of the plan were code named Operation Dynamite, Operation Ajax and Operation Marrow. Devised and vigorously promoted by Sir Winston Churchill, the prime minister of the United Kingdom, the plan was opposed by all the senior British and Allied commanders, who considered it impractical because of insufficient air support and of limited value. The scheme was eventually abandoned in favour of the Normandy landings.

== Background ==
In 1940, British and French plans to prevent exports of Swedish iron ore from Norwegian ports were preempted by Operation Weserübung, the German invasion of Denmark and Norway, which commenced on 9 April 1940. An under-equipped and under-trained Anglo-French force was sent to oppose the invasion and despite some moderate success in the north of Norway, the Battle of France forced a total Allied withdrawal which had been completed by 8 June, followed by the surrender of all Norwegian forces two days later. Brought to power on 10 May 1940 by the failure of the Norwegian Campaign, Churchill believed that Scandinavia was of great strategic importance and authorised a series of successful commando raids on German installations in Norway in 1941 and 1942, leading Adolf Hitler to suspect that the British intended a full-scale invasion there; accordingly the German garrison had been increased from 150,000 to 250,000 men by June 1942. The German naval and air assets based in Norway were well placed to attack the British Arctic convoys, which began taking supplies to the northern ports of the Soviet Union in September 1941.

== Preliminary plans ==
=== Operation Dynamite ===
Even before the Soviet entry into the war, Churchill had asked the Joint Planning Staff (JPS) to consider an amphibious assault on the Norwegian coast, followed by the capture of Oslo, with the intention of providing a platform from which Germany could be bombed or even invaded. The verdict of the JPS on the plan, code named Operation Dynamite, which was presented in a report dated 19 May 1941, was that bomber bases in Norway would have few advantages over those already established in England and that the sea crossing from Norway to Germany was too heavily dominated by enemy forces. The JPS thought that the capture of Stavanger might prove useful, but that German air power in Norway was "sufficient to make a successful invasion improbable".

=== Operation Ajax ===
The idea for an attack on northern Norway might be traced to Joseph Stalin's first wartime message to Churchill on 18 July 1941, in which he requested that Britain mount two offensives against the coast of German-held Europe, one in northern France and the other in the Arctic. Hinting that this might be a joint Anglo-Soviet operation, the idea was again put to the JPS, who stated that they were averse to the proposal because of the large naval and air commitment required. Churchill was not discouraged and wrote to the Chiefs of Staff Committee suggesting that "we should attempt the liberation of Norway at the earliest possible moment". The Germans had been aggressively pushing the bounds of Swedish neutrality at that time, and the Chiefs of Staff felt that the occupation of Trondheim might allow them to render assistance to Sweden if required. However, further study revealed that the resources for such a campaign were not available without compromising home defence or operations in the Mediterranean theatre. In a meeting on 24 September, Churchill refused to accept the report prepared by the Chiefs of Staff, and they reluctantly agreed to pass the matter on to General Sir Alan Brooke, then the Commander-in-Chief, Home Forces, for further consideration. Lieutenant General Henry Pownall, the Vice Chief of the Imperial General Staff, wrote in his diary of his exasperation with Churchill and his Norway scheme which he considered was "not merely dangerous but useless".

Brooke recorded in his war diary on 3 October 1941, that a messenger had arrived at midnight with orders to prepare a plan to attack Trondheim in one week and that he was to go to Chequers, the prime minister's country house, that evening to discuss the idea over dinner. Accordingly, Brooke together with General Sir John Dill, Chief of the Imperial General Staff, Admiral Sir Dudley Pound, the First Sea Lord and Air Chief Marshal Sir Charles Portal, the Chief of the Air Staff and Clement Attlee, the Lord Privy Seal and Leader of the Labour Party were also in attendance. Brooke recorded that "We sat up til 2.15 am discussing the problem and I did my best to put the PM off the plan" and that they "Resumed discussion at 11 am and went on till 1 pm, I think PM is beginning to weaken on the plan". Brooke was mistaken and later wrote: "From then on, we would continually be in trouble riding him [Churchill] off mad plans to go back to Norway. Why he wanted to go back and what he was going to do there, even if he did succeed in capturing Trondheim, we never found out". On 12 October, Brooke was required to present a detailed plan for the Norway invasion, now code named Operation Ajax, which he had compiled with Admiral Sir John Tovey, Air Chief Marshall Sir William Sholto Douglas and General Sir Bernard Paget (who was to command it). Churchill complained that it was not a plan but a "masterly treatise" on the difficulties of the venture. Churchill avoided the main reason (lack of air support) during two hours of interrogation; raising details such as why he foresaw frosts (as stated in the Climate Book) and why would it take 24 hours to go from A to B (because of enemy resistance and removing road blocks). According to one account (but not mentioned by Brooke) Brooke suddenly relented and agreed to mount the expedition on the condition that the navy could take the fleet into Trondheim Fjord in support, but the elderly Pound merely shook his head and ended the discussion. Churchill again asked the Joint Planning Staff to reconsider Ajax without reference to Brooke or Paget, but the JPS, and the Chiefs of Staff, supported Brooke's conclusions, citing the lack of air superiority or any hope of achieving it.

In January 1942, the Chiefs of Staff approved Operation Hardboiled, a plan by the London Controlling Section, a new secret department tasked with strategic deception. 'Hardboiled' purported that the Allies were intending to attack Stavanger, with the intention of persuading the Germans to reinforce Norway at the expense of other active fronts; the Royal Marines Division was scheduled for mountain warefare training, Norwegian interpreters were recruited, maps of the coast printed and Double-Cross System agents reported rumours of the operation to their German handlers. How effective this deception was is unclear, but Hitler did reinforce the Norwegian garrison during April and May 1942 and thereafter was obsessed by the need to defend the Norwegian coast.

=== Operation Marrow ===
A joint Anglo-Soviet offensive into Arctic Norway and Finland was proposed to Lieutenant General Sir Archibald Nye during his visit to Moscow in December 1941. Code named Operation Marrow, the project was abandoned in the following month, when the Soviets withdrew their support on the grounds that the Finnish intelligence service had discovered the details of it.

== The final plan ==
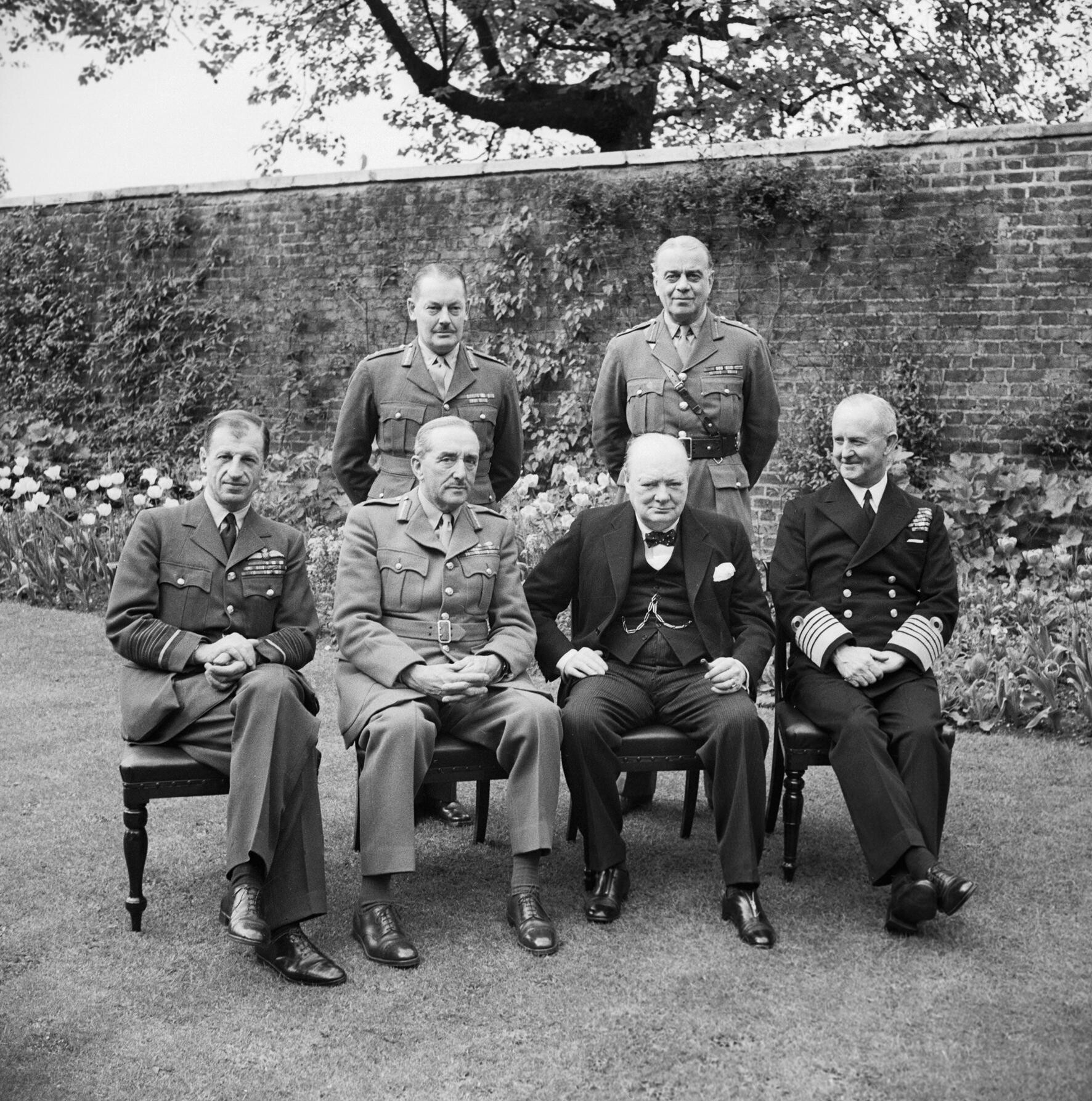
Churchill with the Chiefs of Staff, who had strongly resisted the Norwegian invasion plans from the outset.

Not deterred by his earlier rebuttal, Churchill set out his "constructive plan" in a memorandum headed Operation Jupiter dated 1 May 1942, addressed to Major General Hastings "Pug" Ismay, the Secretary of the Chiefs of Staff Committee. In that document, Churchill explained his objectives for the proposed operation, which he considered was of "high strategic and political importance" and should be considered as an alternative to Operation Sledgehammer, the US proposal for an invasion of France, which was scheduled for later that year. Churchill wrote: "If we could gain possession of these airfields [in northern Norway] and establish an equal force there, not only would the northern sea route to Russia be kept open, but we should have set up a second front on a small scale from which it would be most difficult to eject us. If the going was good we could advance slowly southward, unrolling the Nazi map of Europe from the top". As a preliminary, six squadrons of British fighters would be based at Murmansk in Russia. Abandoning the idea of taking Trondheim, Petsamo area on the north coast of Finland would be the site of an initial seaborne assault by a division-sized force, while a brigade would capture the airfield at Porsanger Fjord. Churchill thought that surprise could be achieved by the invasion transports being disguised as an Arctic convoy and that the troops could be accommodated on board the same ships during the winter. He claimed that careful planning could avoid an "undue strain" being put upon the Home Fleet. As instructed, the Chiefs of Staff referred the memo to the Joint Planning Staff.

== Criticism and final abandonment ==
Both the Joint Planning Staff and the Chiefs of Staff Committee failed to find any virtue in Churchill's revised plan. In a memo dated 8 June 1942, they restated their objections based mainly on insufficient air cover, this time compounded by the autumn and winter weather in which the operation was expected to be carried out. Weight was added to the argument by Vice Admiral Louis Mountbatten, the Chief of Combined Operations and a protégé of Churchill's, who unexpectedly wrote to the director of naval planning, saying that Jupiter was "impractical" and that no further time should be spent on the project. Mountbatten was already involved with Project Plough, a plan for the First Special Service Force, a joint American-Canadian commando unit, to be inserted by air into the Norwegian mountains; however, it seems that there was never any serious plan to link the two operations.

Churchill was again rebuffed by the Chiefs of Staff in a meeting on 6 July. Churchill then approached General Andrew McNaughton to get him to agree to the use of his Canadian Corps in the operation, hoping to circumvent the Chiefs of Staff. McNaughton and his staff spent some time compiling a revision of Operation Jupiter, concluding that it would only be possible if the weather conditions were fortunate. The report was finished on 7 August but Churchill did not see it until 14 September, much to his annoyance. Churchill then summoned McNaughton to Chequers to discuss his report, hoping to coerce him into agreement. Forewarned by Brooke, McNaughton prevaricated but agreed to examine the "Trondheim operation", though afterwards he sent a telegram to the Canadian prime minister, McKenzie King, asking him on no account to allow the use of Canadian troops in Norway. He told Alanbrooke that he had had a "ghastly weekend, kept up all hours of the night until he did not know which way he was facing". When Churchill cabled King to ask if McNaughton could be sent to Moscow to solicit Soviet assistance for Jupiter, King refused on the grounds that Jupiter was not realistic and that McNaughton had no confidence in it.

Churchill had discussed the Operation Jupiter with Franklin D Roosevelt on several occasions, and did so again on 27 July 1943. Churchill managed to keep the Jupiter idea alive, even suggesting that Project Habakkuk, a plan for a giant aircraft carrier made from a mixture of ice and sawdust, might solve the air cover issue. He managed to get Jupiter inserted into resolution of the Quebec Conference in August 1943, as an alternative plan to Operation Overlord, should that not prove possible. As a final ploy, Churchill referred Jupiter to Lieutenant-General Sir Frederick Morgan, who was the Chief of Staff to the Supreme Allied Commander and was responsible for the Overlord planning. Morgan's report pointed out the difficulties of an invasion of Norway compared to an invasion of Normandy and that preparing for Jupiter would inevitably impact on the preparations for Overlord. The failure of Roosevelt and the Joint Chiefs of Staff to agree to Jupiter finally sealed the fate of the plan, and Alanbrooke hoped on 25 September 1942 that he was "giving up the idea of the North Norway attack".

Alanbrooke commented that they never found out why Churchill "wanted to go back (to Norway) and what he was going to do there, even if he did succeed in capturing Trondheim. The only reason he ever gave was that Hitler had unrolled the map of Europe starting with Norway, and he would start rolling it up again from Norway."

However Churchill raised it again as late as January 1944. Instead of an actual invasion, the Allies implemented Operation Solo I, a deception plan designed to draw attention away from the preparations for Operation Torch, the invasion of north Africa, by creating the impression that troops based in Scotland were preparing to invade Norway.

== Sources ==
- Alanbrooke, Field Marshal Lord (2001). Danchev, Alex; Todman, Daniel (eds.). War Diaries 1939–1945. Phoenix Press. ISBN 1-84212-526-5.
- Barber, Mary (2009). D-day Deception: Operation Fortitude and the Normandy Invasion. Stackpole Books. ISBN 978-0811735346.
- Churchill, Winston S. (1950). The Second World War: The Hinge of Fate: Volume IV. Boston: Houghton Mifflin Company. ISBN 0-395-41058-4.
- Horn, Bernd; Wyczynski, Michel (2013). Of Courage and Determination: The First Special Service Force, "The Devil's Brigade," 1942–44. Toronto: Dundurn. ISBN 978-1459709645.
- Commager, Henry Steele (2004). The Story of the Second World War. Brassey's. ISBN 978-1-57488-741-9.
- Fraser, David (1982). Alanbrooke. Atheneum New York. ISBN 0-689-11267-X.
- Kennedy, Paul M., ed. (1992). Grand Strategies in War and Peace. Yale University Press. ISBN 978-0300056662.
- Knight, Nigel (2008). Churchill, the Greatest Briton Unmasked. David & Charles. ISBN 978-0715328538.
- Mann, Christopher (2012). British Policy and Strategy Towards Norway, 1941–45. Palgrave Macmillan. ISBN 978-0230210226.
