= Jean-Baptiste Nicolas Roch de Ramezay =

18th-century French military officer and colonial administrator in New France

- Born: 4 September 1708; Chateau de Ramezay, Montreal, New France
- Died: 7 May 1777 (aged 68); Blaye, France
- Military career
- Branch: Marines
- Service years: 1719–1759
- Rank: Captain
- Conflicts: Battle of Grand Pré; Battle of the Plains of Abraham
- Awards: Order of Saint Louis
- Other work: Colonial Administrator, New France

Jean-Baptiste Nicolas Roch, Seigneur de Ramezay, (Note: We find nobility titles as follows and orthographed in the following way : Ramezay, Ramsay, Ramesay or again Ramesai) (4 September 1708, in Montreal, New France – 7 May 1777, in Blaye, France) was an officer of the marines and colonial administrator for New France during the 18th century. Joining at age 11, as an ensign, he fought campaigns against the Meskwaki tribe in Illinois, and the British in Acadia. In 1759, during the Seven Years' War, as the King's lieutenant; he signed, in the name of Louis XV, the Articles of Capitulation of Quebec, for which he was later criticised.

== Early life ==
Jean-Baptiste Nicholas Roch was the youngest son of Claude de Ramezay and Marie-Charlotte Denys de la Ronde, daughter of Pierre Denys de La Ronde (1631 – 1708) and Catherine Le Neuf. He was born on 4 September 1708 and raised in the family chateau in Montreal with his sister, Louise de Ramezay and two sisters. On 7 May 1720, he became an ensign of the colonial regulars, in which his older brother, Charles Hector de Ramezay, was a lieutenant. When his brother died, in August 1725, Jean's mother, Charlotte Denys de Ramezay, purchased the lieutenancy for him.

== Career ==
After his promotion was confirmed, on 23 April 1726, he served under Gaspard-Joseph Chaussegros de Léry, an engineer employed in the rebuilding of Fort Niagara. The fort, near Youngstown, was designed to protect French interests from the British, who had recently settled at Oswego. Ramezay spent the spring of 1728 campaigning against the Fox tribe in Illinois, under Constant le Marchand de Lignery, then, in 1731, was assigned to make peace with the Ojibwas tribe by Governor Beauharnois. He was promoted to captain in 1734, then, in 1742, is noted as commanding a fort at the mouth of the Onaman river.

=== King George's War ===
In 1744 War broke out between France and Britain, and in 1746 the French launched a massive counterattack in an attempt to overturn British gains in Acadia. More than 7,000 troops under Jean-Baptiste Louis Frédéric de La Rochefoucauld de Roye, duc d'Anville, were sent in ships to recapture Louisbourg and Annapolis Royal then, if the first two objectives were achieved, to launch an attack on Boston. Ramezay was to provide ground support and was given command of a force of 1,800 French-Canadian militia and a number of Native Americans. On 10 July, he landed with 700 men at Baie Verte in New Brunswick, stationing himself in Beaubassin, he began gathering troops before laying siege to Fort Anne. D'Anville's fleet was broken up by Atlantic storms however. Some ships were forced to return to France while the rest sought refuge in Chebucto Harbour, now Halifax. Ramezay was therefore forced to withdraw to Minas.

==== Massacre at Grand-Pre ====
Hearing of Ramezay's retreat, the fort's commanding officer, Lieutenant-Colonel Arthur Noble led an expedition of 400-500 men to drive Ramezay out. Ramezay again had to retreat, this time to Beaubassin, leaving Noble to billet his men in Grand-Pre for the winter. Noble failed to take precautions against a counterattack however, believing the distance and inhospitable weather to be sufficient defence. Ramezay planned a surprise assault, sending a detachment of 300 men under Captain Nicolas Antoine II Coulon-de-Villiers across the mountains in hostile conditions. While staying overnight in the Gaspereau Valley, they learned of the precise positions of Noble and his troops from their Acadian hosts. This important information, coupled with the attack taking place at 3:00 am in a snowstorm, meant that many of the British died in their beds. Noble refused an offer to surrender and was shot dead. The massacre at Grand-Pré, as the battle became known, was in vain, however, as the French once more withdrew, allowing the British to recapture it the following spring. Nevertheless, Ramezay returned a hero and was decorated with the Cross of St Louis on 15 February 1748.

In 1749 Ramezay was promoted to Major of Quebec, a post he held for nine years, until being appointed King's Lieutenant. In the spring of 1759 he was given responsibility for defense of the upper town against an expected attack by British forces under Major General James Wolfe.

=== Siege of Quebec ===
It was generally agreed that the city of Quebec was not able to withstand a siege: Its chief engineer, Nicholas Sarrebource de Pontleroy stated that, "The city is not capable of useful defence in case of a siege, having neither ditches nor counterscarps nor covered way, and being dominated by heights behind which there is cover for approach"; the French commander, Louis-Joseph de Montcalm, wrote in his journal, "...an army that can get near its walls is sure to compel its surrender sooner or later", and his Aide de Camp, Louis Antoine de Bougainville, also recorded, "If the approaches to the city were not defended, the city would have to surrender". The main strategy for the defence of Quebec therefore was to oppose the British landing, specifically between the Saint-Charles River and the Montmorency Falls.

Nevertheless, some steps were taken to fortify the city and prepare for a siege. Ramezay describes in his diary how for two weeks thousands of men, soldiers and sailors, carried, dug and hacked at the earth. Houses with their backs to the water had their walls strengthened, and those along the Beauport shore were punched through with loopholes. Warehouses were demolished to improve fields of fire, and footpaths were rendered impassable. To lessen the burden on the city's rations, Montcalm sent all the women, children, magistrates and all those not contributing to the defence of the city, to Trois-Rivières. He also planned for defeat, hiding supplies, ammunition and food along the banks of the St Lawrence River; his proposed route of retreat, and sending the colony's supply ships fifty miles upstream to Batiscan to prevent their possible capture.

After being defeated on the Plains of Abraham on 13 September 1759, the French troops were dispersed; Montcalm, mortally wounded, managed to retire to Quebec with some of his troops, Bougainville and the remainder retreated in the direction of Montreal whilst the governor of New France, Lieutenant General Pierre de Rigaud de Vaudreuil de Cavagnal abandoned the Beauport shore and marched west in order to rendezvous with him.

Vaudreuil sent word to Ramezay notifying him of his withdrawal and instructing him to defend the city until "he shall fall short of provisions", at which point he was to select the most capable officer to propose its capitulation.

The British, now in control of the plains, brought up heavy artillery including twelve 24 pound cannons, large mortars and four inch howitzers, with which to bombard the city. A battery on the opposite shore at Point Levi had already made it impossible for the defenders of the city to remain on its walls and Vice-Admiral Saunders who had hitherto kept his largest ships downstream, now brought seven of the most powerful to join the frigates already in the basin. The British were keen to settle things quickly before the onset of winter, and this show of strength was to facilitate a prompt surrender.

A review on 14 September revealed Ramezay to have 2,200 men comprising 330 French and colonial regulars, 20 artillery men, 500 sailors and 1,300 militiamen. Together with the 4,000 inhabitants, Ramezay reasoned he had enough rations for eight days. On 15 September, he received a remonstrance from some of the most important townspeople asking him to capitulate rather than risk the sacking of the city. Ramezay called a council of war, giving everyone an opportunity to air their views. Only one, Louis-Thomas Jacau de Fiedmont, was against surrender. In summing up, Ramezay declared, "Considering the instructions I have received from the Marquis de Vaudreuil and the scarcity of provisions, proved by the returns to me furnished and the searches I have made, I conclude to endeavour to obtain from the enemy the most honourable capitulation".

Two days after the meeting, Ramezay composed a letter to Vaudreuil telling how the town had been left without sufficient provisions following the retreat, how the citizens feared an assault and how the sailors and militiamen had lost the will to fight, the Plains of Abraham were now occupied by enemy batteries and he was not hopeful that Vaudreuil's army, which was now scattered, would come to the rescue. Furthermore, a promise of flour from Vaudreuil had failed to arrive. Ramezay finished by saying that his duty was to save the garrison and the citizens of the city. Ramezay then sent the Mayor of Quebec, Armand de Joannes, under a flag of truce to discuss the terms of surrender. Vaudreuil, who had received reinforcements and was marching from Jacques-Cartier with the intention of expelling the British from the plains, sent a second set of instructions asking Ramezay to hold out but these arrived after Ramezay had returned a signed document of capitulation. The British took control of the city on the afternoon of 18 September 1759.

Ramezay received some criticism for his actions not least from Vaudreuil and Bougainville but others were quick to defend him; Francois Daine, lieutenant general for civil and criminal affairs at the court of Quebec, wrote a letter to Versailles stating that Ramezay had surrendered in order not to, "...expose the garrison and the people to a general assault, and thereby the fury of the avenger, according to the laws of war". He also told how they were on the brink of dying from hunger.

== Later life ==
Ramezay was returned to France. His wife sold their possessions in Canada and left with her daughter, son in law and their two children to join him in 1765. He died in Blaye on 7 May 1777.

== See also ==
- Military of New France

== Bibliography ==
- Grenier, John (2008). The Far Reaches of Empire: War in Nova Scotia 1710-1760. Oklahoma: University of Oklahoma Press. ISBN 978-0806138763.
- Jobb, Dean W. (2005). The Cajuns: A People's Story of Exile and Triumph. Hoboken: Wiley Publishing Inc. ISBN 978-0-470-83609-5.
- Snow, Dan (2009). Death or Victory - The Battle of Quebec and The Birth of Empire. London: Harper Collins. ISBN 978-0-00-728620-1.
