= Dundurn Castle =

19th-century neoclassical Canadian building

Coordinates: 43.269481°N 79.884649°W

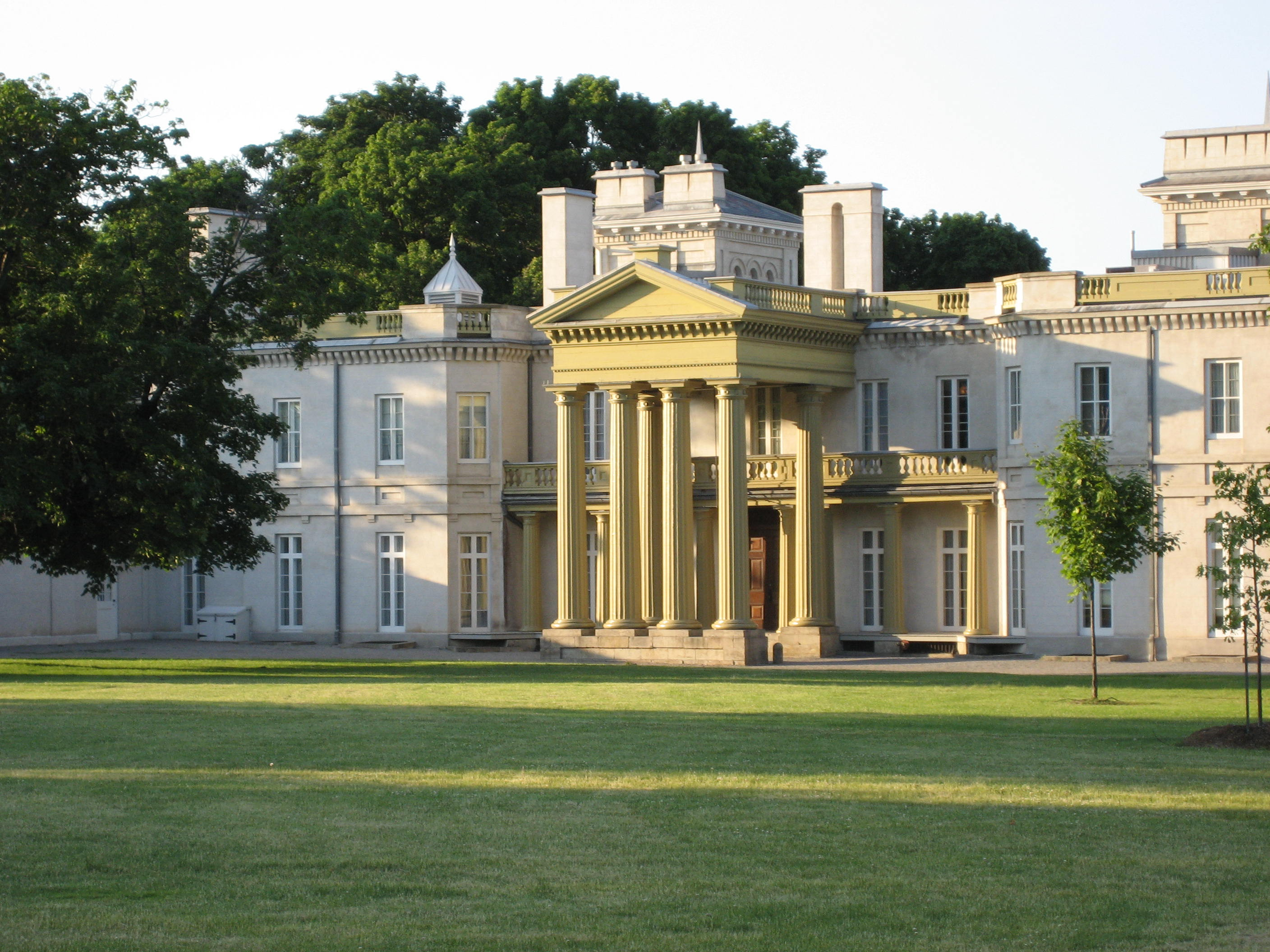
- Established: 1830s
- Location: 610 York Boulevard; Hamilton, Ontario, Canada
- Type: Regency château
- Website: Official site

National Historic Site of Canada
- Designated: 1984

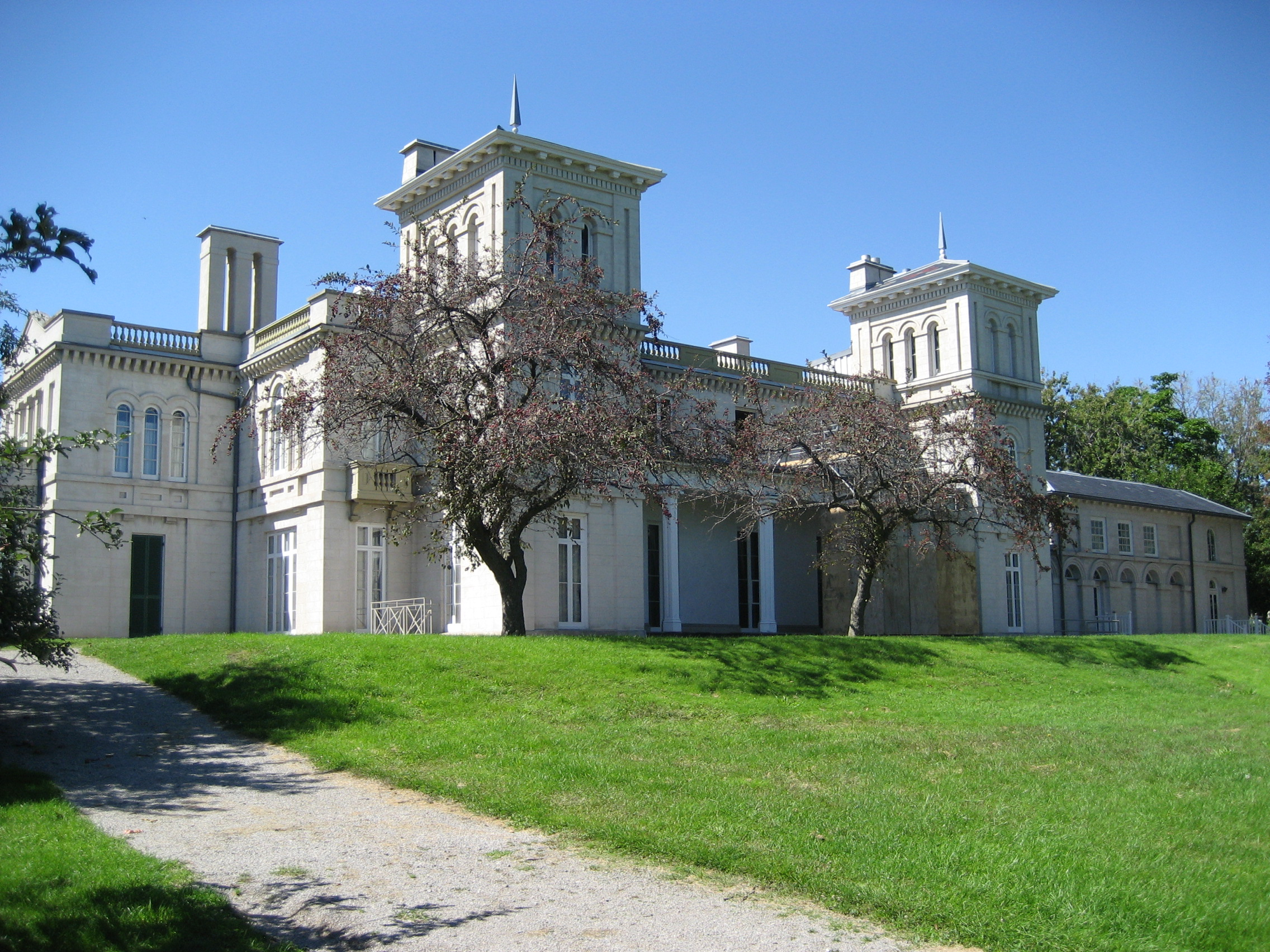
Dundurn Castle (back, facing Burlington Bay)

Dundurn Castle is a historic neoclassical mansion on York Boulevard in Hamilton, Ontario, Canada. The 1,700-square-metre (18,000 sq ft) house took three years and $175,000 to build and was completed in 1835.

The forty-room house featured the latest conveniences of the day, including gas lighting and running water. It is currently owned by the City of Hamilton, which purchased it in 1899 or 1900 for $50,000. The city has spent nearly $3 million renovating the site to make it open to the public. The rooms have been restored to the year 1855 when its owner Sir Allan Napier MacNab, 1st Baronet, was at the height of his career. Costumed interpreters guide visitors through the home, illustrating daily life from the 1850s. Camilla, Queen of Canada, a descendant of Sir Allan MacNab, is the Royal Patron of Dundurn Castle.

== History ==
Dundurn Castle, a Regency house, was completed in 1835 by architect Robert Charles Wetherell. Sir Allan MacNab purchased the property from Richard Beasley, one of Hamilton's early settlers, who was forced by financial difficulties to sell lands at Burlington Heights (now Dundurn Park). MacNab built Dundurn Castle on the foundations of Beasley's brick home. Once built, Dundurn Castle became famous across Canada for its grand entertainments. Sir John A. Macdonald and King Edward VII are among those who have been entertained there.

MacNab, later Premier of the Province of Canada between 1854 and 1856, hired architect Robert Wetherall and construction of this stately home was completed in 1835. The pillars and portico were added in 1855 as part of the preparations for the wedding of MacNab's daughter Sophia.

After MacNab's death, the estate was used as an institution for the deaf and was purchased in 1872 by Donald McInnes, who sold Dundurn to the City of Hamilton in 1899. In the late 1960s, Dundurn Castle was restored as a Centennial project and is now designated as a National Historic Site of Canada.

A Strathspey for bagpipes was composed in honour of Dundurn Castle.

== Grounds ==
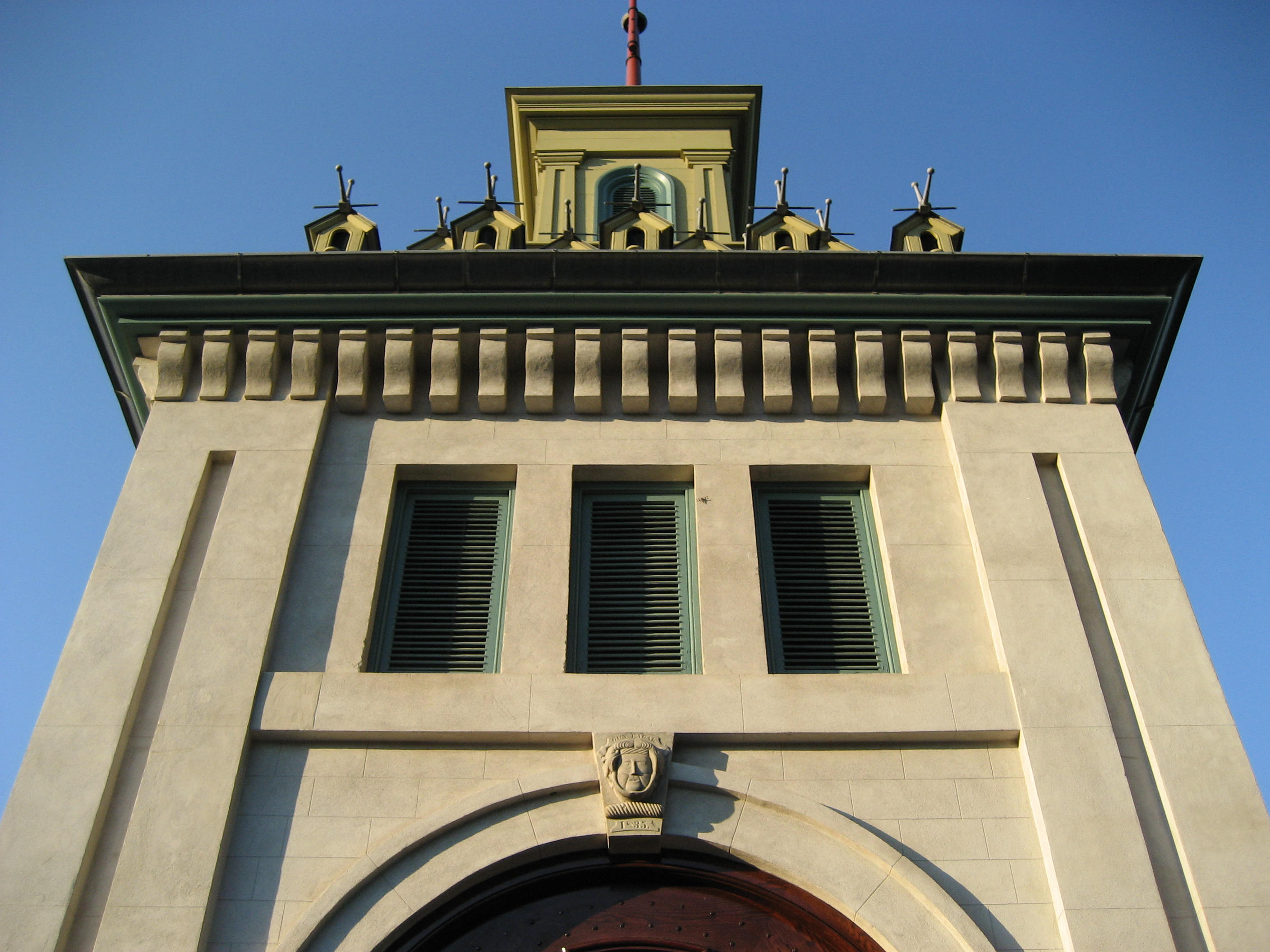
Dundurn Park, Aviary building

A large German artillery piece, booty from the World War I, was removed from the southeastern part of the park in the mid-1980s. Until about 1990, it housed an aviary, which was moved to the Westdale neighbourhood. The covered pavilion formerly offered picnickers protection from the cold, but in the last few years a walled garden was put in its place. The gates at the front entrance of the park originally came from England, but the stone pillars were cut from the Dundas mountain. In 1931, parts of the gates were removed and taken to the Chedoke Golf Club.

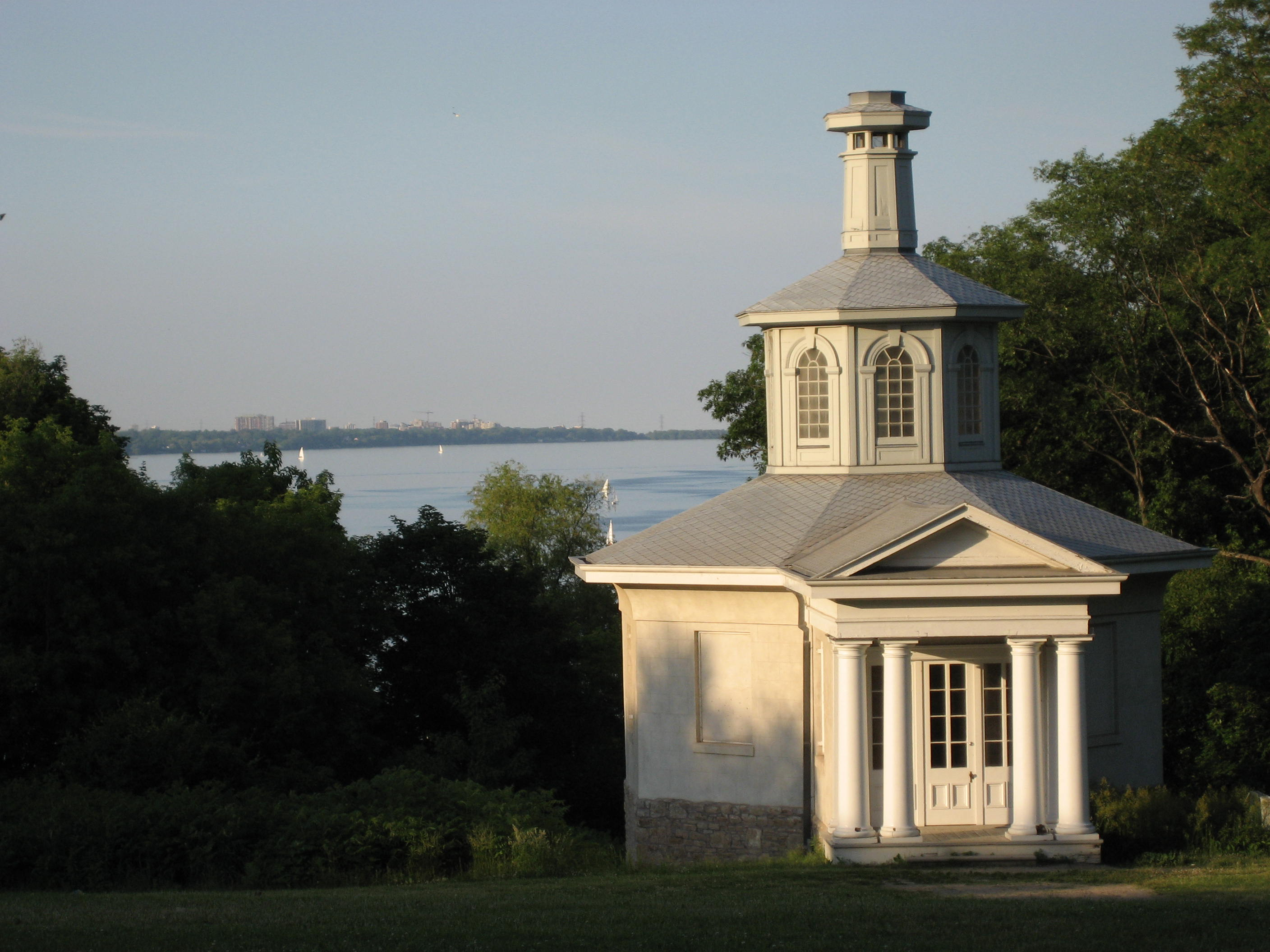
The folly in Dundurn Park

Dundurn Park has its own folly, just east of the castle. Living up to its purpose, it had confused some people who had considered it a theatre, a laundry, a boat-house, a buttery, an office, a chapel for Sir Allan's Roman Catholic wife, or even a cockfighting ring, but no proof of the last use has ever been found. Urban legend has it that many tunnels exist, leading from the Castle to various parts of the estate and one of the entrances was through the folly.

MacNab was originally buried in 1862 on the Dundurn Park grounds between Dundurn Castle and Castle Dean on the corner of Locke Street and Tecumseh Street. In 1909, his body was removed and taken to Holy Sepulchre Cemetery in western Hamilton.

== Usages ==
The park includes Hamilton Military Museum, with displays on the War of 1812, the Rebellions of 1837, the Boer War, World War I, World War II and the role of women in the military.

Dundurn Castle was used for filming the 2025 Canadian series Heated Rivalry.

== See also ==
- List of attractions in Hamilton, Ontario
- List of castles in Canada
