= Louise de Ramezay =

Canadian businesswoman (1705–1776)

Louise de Ramezay (1705–1776) was a businesswoman from Montreal, Quebec, Canada, who successfully managed several businesses in colonial times. She owned and operated a chain of sawmills and other enterprises to remain financially secure as a Canadian aristocrat.

== Biography ==
Louise was born on 6 July 1705, the daughter of Claude de Ramezay, governor of Montreal, and Marie-Charlotte Denys de La Ronde. Louise was educated at the Ursuline convent in Quebec City.

Her father built his first sawmill at the beginning of the 18th century on the Ramezay property located on the seigneury of Chambly, Quebec, on the banks of the Huron River. The sawmill was well situated so it could supply beams, planks and planking to customers, including the shipyards of Quebec City.

At around 30, Louise assumed a management role by taking partial control of the family's sawmill, which was not easy given that it was destroyed with regularity by spring floods. When her father died in 1724, his wife initially assumed management of the sawmill in partnership with Clément de Sabrevois de Bleury, but that arrangement ended in a long and messy lawsuit. After it was settled in 1739, Louise assumed sole management from her mother and prospered.

According to Fortin: "It was therefore quite natural that she took over the management when the opportunity arose. Until her death at the age of 71, this single woman ran her sawmill and other enterprises with unwavering determination, despite the numerous obstacles." According to Paré:

"For over 30 years, Louise de Ramezay constantly ensured that the sawmill on the Huron River remained operational, as the business had to pay an annual rent of 112 livres to the seigneurs of Chambly and 600 livres to her sisters and her brother, Jean-Baptiste-Nicolas-Roch, who, like her, were heirs to their father's estate."

By 1755, Louise was operating a tannery and several other mills in addition to the one she had inherited. The contract for the first sawmill was renewed regularly, which was considered a "testament to its success and almost uninterrupted operation."

Louise never married. She died in Chambly, Quebec, on 22 October 1776.
