= Chateau St. Louis =

Historic site in Quebec, Canada

Coordinates: 46.8124°N 71.2044°W

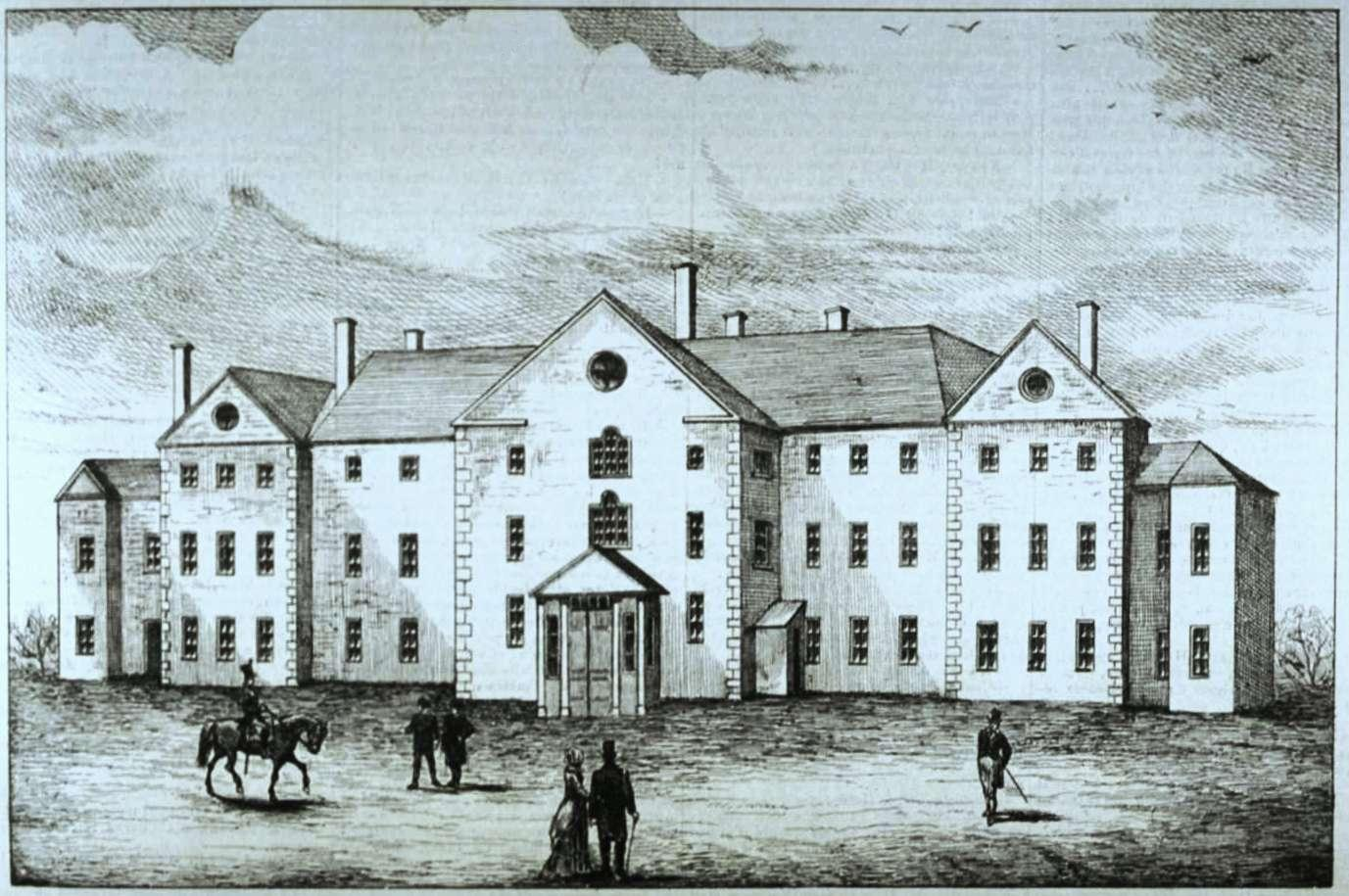
Chateau St. Louis

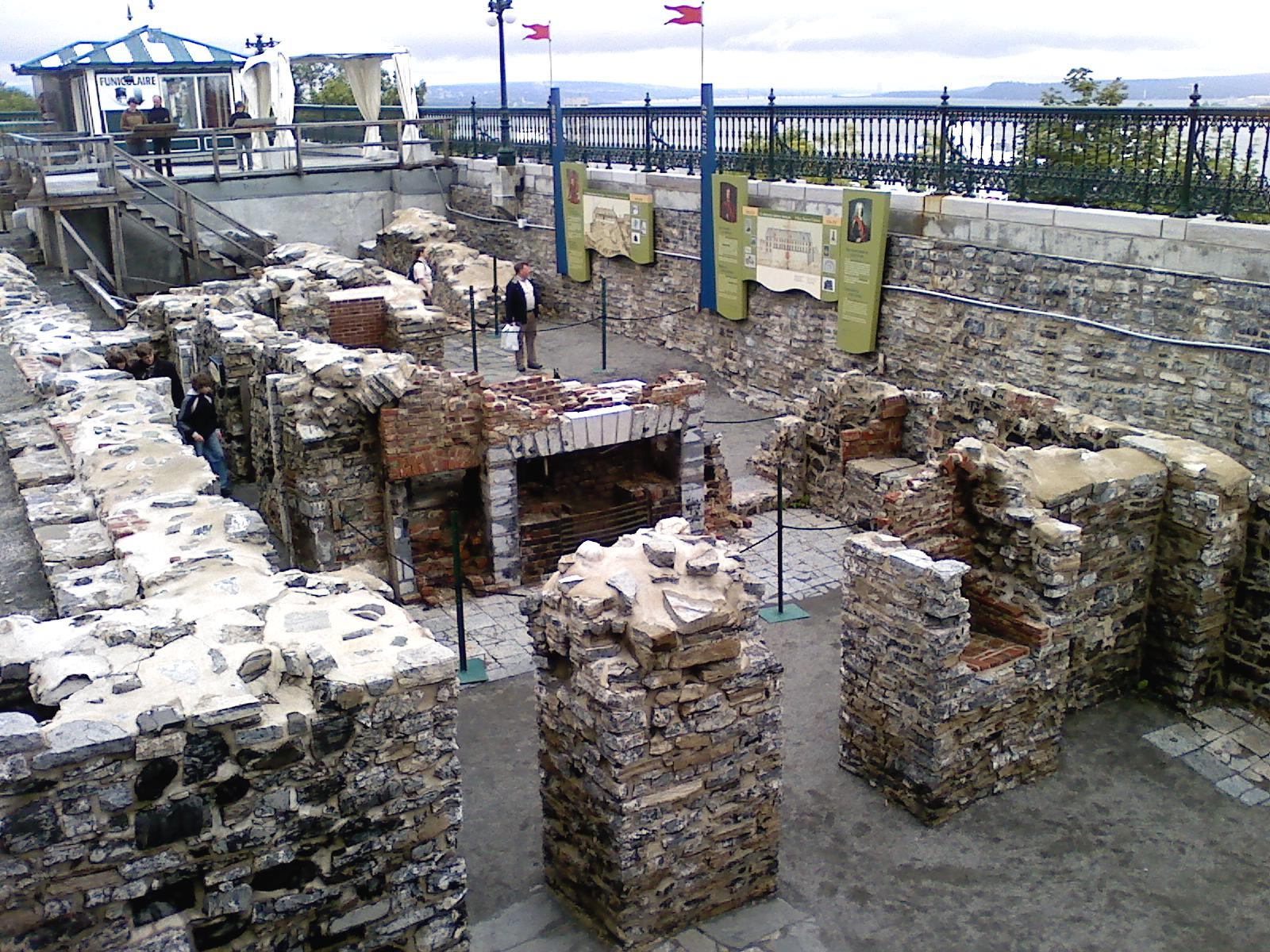
Ruins at the former site

The Chateau St. Louis (French: Château Saint-Louis, pronounced [ʃɑto sɛ̃ lwi]) in Quebec City was the official residence of the French Governor of New France and later the British Governor of Quebec, the Governor-General of British North America, and the Lieutenant-Governor of Lower Canada.

The site was designated a National Historic Site of Canada in 2002.

== First chateau ==
The first chateau was built under the direction of Governor Charles Huault de Montmagny in 1648, but by the 1680s, it was in a state of disrepair.

== Second chateau ==
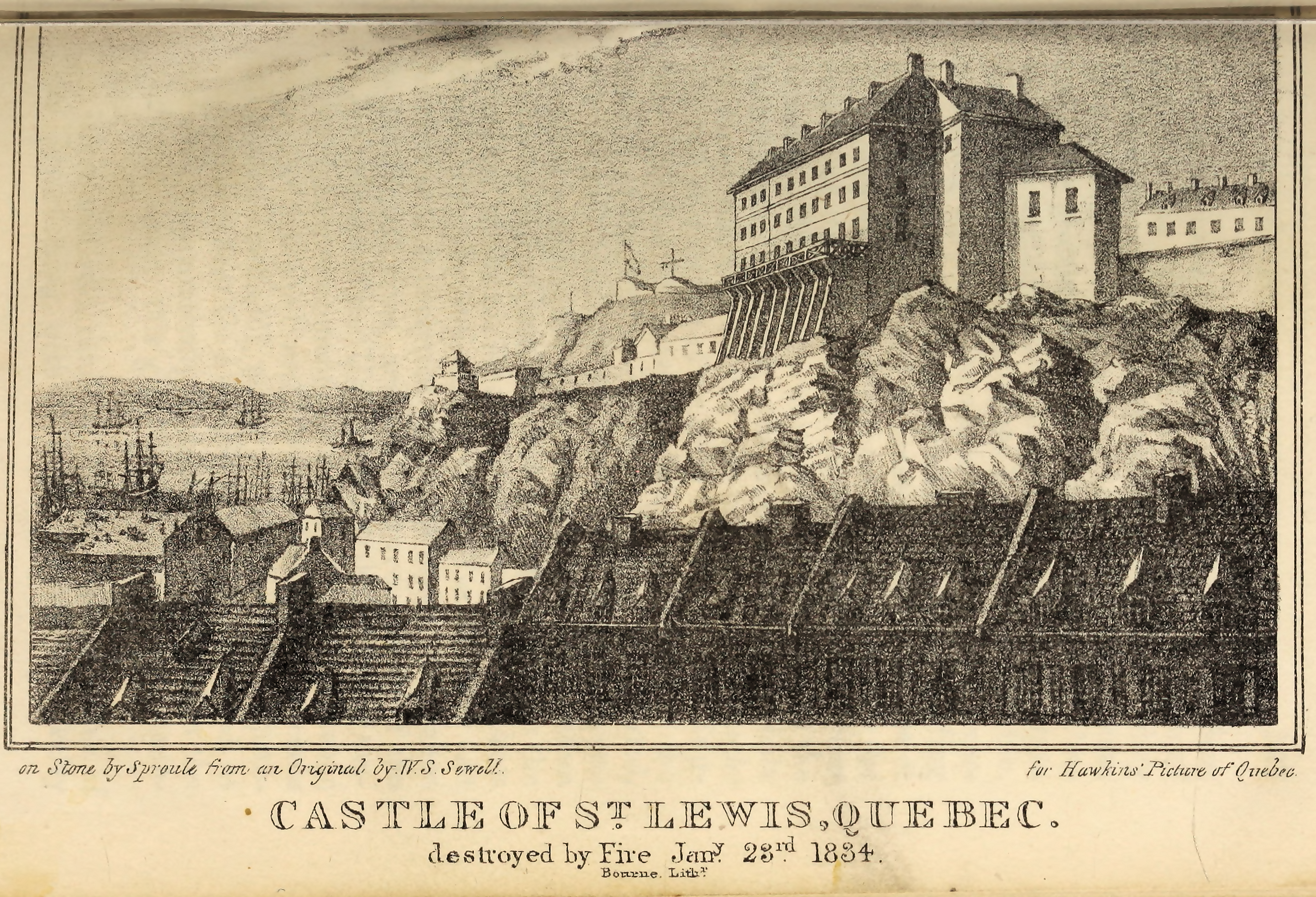
"Castle of St. Lewis," as it was then called, before its destruction by fire

Construction of a replacement on the same site began in 1694 under Governor General Louis de Buade de Frontenac. Frontenac died there in 1698. A new pavilion and two new wings were added from 1719 to 1723 by Gaspard-Joseph Chaussegros de Léry.

The building was then severely damaged during the Siege of Quebec in 1759, after which it passed into British hands.

The house was gradually rebuilt in sections over the next forty years. In the meantime, the governors split their time between St. Louis and a new building, called the New Chateau or Chateau Haldimand, after Governor Haldimand.

The St. Louis was destroyed by fire in January 1834. Afterwards, it was replaced by a series of terraces.

The site of the New Chateau is now occupied by the Chateau Frontenac hotel, which is named after Governor Frontenac.

During the 1820s and 1830s, the governor and his family also used a summer home in Sorel (Governor’s Cottage or Maison des Gouverneur which was also used by Commander-in-Chief of Quebec) and the Montreal (Chateau de Ramezay).

== Today ==
Between 2005 and 2007, a series of digs under the Dufferin Terrasse revealed over 500,000 artifacts and ruins of the forts and château. In 2008, for Quebec City's 400th anniversary, the remains of Saint-Louis Forts and Châteaux were opened to the public as a Historic Site under the management of Parks Canada.

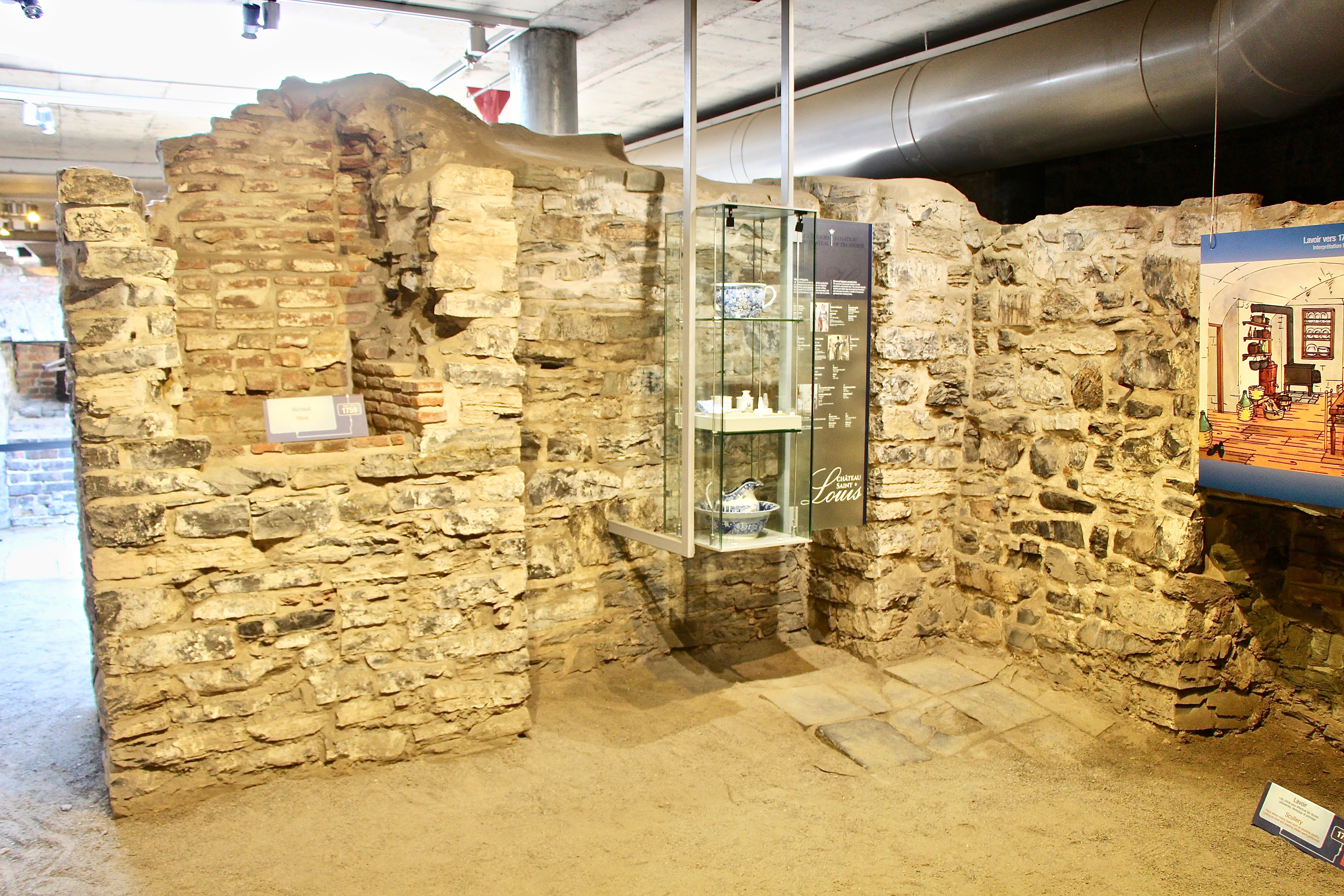
Saint-Louis Forts and Châteaux Historic Site, opened to the public to visit
