= Claude de Ramezay =

Canadian politician

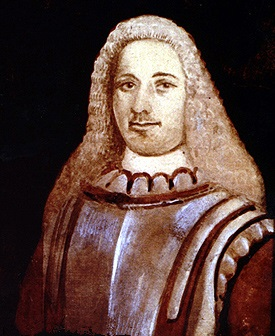
- Born: June 15, 1659; Burgundy, France
- Died: July 31, 1724 (aged 65); Quebec City, New France
- Known for: builder of the Château de Ramezay
- Parent(s): Timothé de Ramezay; Catherine Tribouillard

Claude de Ramezay (15 June 1659 – 31 July 1724) was an important figure in the early history of New France. He was a military man by training and rose to being commander of the colonial regular troops.

== Life ==
Claude de Ramezay was a son of Timothé de Ramezay and Catherine Tribouillard, daughter of Hilaire Tribouillard, intendant in charge of the extensive stables of the Prince de Condé. He moved to Canada in 1685 as a lieutenant in the colonial regular troops and was promoted to the rank of captain two years later.

In 1690, Ramezay married the daughter of Pierre Denys de La Ronde (1631 - 1708) and thus was joined to one of the elite families of New France. He then bought the position of governor of Trois-Rivières from the widow of René Gaultier de Varennes and became governor there in 1691. In 1699, Ramezay left Trois-Rivières to become the commander of the Canadian troops. He served satisfactorily and was awarded the cross of Saint-Louis for his efforts. In 1704 he succeeded his rival Philippe de Rigaud de Vaudreuil as governor of Montreal.

Ramezay was also the acting governor of New France from 1714 to 1716 while governor Philippe de Rigaud Vaudreuil was on leave in France.

During his life he owned 8 slaves.

== Legacy ==
Ramezay was survived by two sons and at least five daughters. In 1711 his eldest son, 19-year-old Claude junior, an ensign in the French navy, lost his life in an attack on Rio de Janeiro. His second son, Louis, Sieur de Monnoir, was killed by the Cherokees during the campaign of 1715 against the Fox Indians. In 1712 Ramezay's third son, Charles-Hector, Sieur de La Gesse, was presented to the French court by Madame de Vaudreuil. La Gesse, the elder of the surviving sons, died on 27 Aug. 1725 in the wreck of the Chameau off Île Royale. The younger, Jean-Baptiste-Nicolas-Roch, entered the military and is perhaps best remembered as the man who surrendered Quebec to the British in September 1759. Of the five daughters, two became nuns and two others married officers of the colonial regular troops. The fifth was Louise de Ramezay who took over the family business and expanded it to include several sawmills and other businesses.
