= George Sumner (artist) =

American painter and environmentalist

- Born: April 29, 1940 (age 86); San Francisco, California
- Known for: painter, environmentalist
- Movement: abstract impressionism, environmental impressionism
- Website: www.sumner-studios.com

George Sumner (born Aprıl 29,1940) is an American oil painter and environmental activist who began his career by creating marine-themed abstracts in the 1970s.

Sumner's painting style appears similar to airbrushing, but he applies oil paint directly to large canvasses with baby diapers prior to blending and layering. His palette of high contrast colors often includes deep blue-green-orche or pink-violets-ruby, which are frequently lightened with pure or slightly off whites. Common subjects and motifs he has returned to over the years include sea caves, coastlines, starfields, whales, dolphins, sea lions, jellyfish, volcanoes, butterflies, the Golden Gate Bridge, San Francisco Bay, fog, hummingbirds, dragonflies and grape leaves.

== Early life ==
Sumner was born and raised in San Francisco. He completed high school and served a three year tour of duty in Southeast Asia with the Navy (1959–61). He then attended the City College of San Francisco, where he focused on Ornamental Horticulture. He intermittently attended the San Francisco Art Institute from 1963-66.

== Career ==
In 1967-74 Sumner worked as a gardener in San Francisco's Golden Gate Park. In 1970 he won a city-wide competition to create the official logo for the Golden Gate Park's 100th anniversary. He later create celebratory works of art for a number of commemorative events. In 1975 he began working full-time as an artist.

One of Sumner's early works is "First Breath" which depicts a humpback whale mother lifting her newborn to the surface to collect his first breath of air. This was used as the first fine art poster to raise money for the environmental group Greenpeace.

His work "Sweet Liberty", an abstracted version of the Statue of Liberty, was selected to commemorate the 100th anniversary of the opening of the Statue of Liberty in New York Harbor. in 1986. That painting is now housed in the Liberty Island museum. Another painting with this theme, "The Spirit of America", with the statue's base draped in an American flag, was created after the 9/11 terrorist attacks. Lithographs were presented to people and families effected by attacks in New York City and Washington D.C. Sumner created "The Impossible Dream" in 1987, commemorating the 50th anniversary of the opening of San Francisco's Golden Gate Bridge. It was featured as part of the anniversary celebration.

Sumner's painting "The Peacemakers" embodies the theme of World peace and understanding. It depicts two dolphins kissing while floating above the earth. It was presented by Sumner to the then leader of the Soviet Union, Mikhail Gorbachev on his visit to Stanford University in 1990. Gorbachev saw the piece as Sumner stood with it on the sidewalk at Stanford's Hoover Institution, broke from his security detail, and held a five minute discussion with Summer.

Another significant piece in this vein is 1995's "Renewal," painted to commemorate the 50th anniversary of the signing of the United Nations' charter. This piece depicts the Golden Gate Bridge cradling the earth in a rough representation of the United Nations logo.

== Advocacy ==
Sumner participates actively in environmental causes, and promotes the importance of art education. He is a long-time associate and supporter of Greenpeace, the Sea Shepherd Conservation Society, and the Rainforest Action Network. He has donated hundreds of pieces of artwork for fundraisers, produces artwork for particular campaigns, and painted various environmental groups' marine ships (including the bow of the Rainbow Warrior. He also has decorated a series of buses for local transit agencies that are used in elementary school environmental outreach and art education programs.

George Sumner and his wife Donnalei, Manager and Publicist for Sumner Studios/Galleries for the last twenty-seven years, have operated a family-owned business together. Their story is based on their company focused on using art to promote environmental awareness.

== Collections ==
Sumner's works are ın many private collections around the world. His paintings are also held in many public collections, including:

- United Nations (New York Headquarters, "Renewal" official painting for 50th Anniversary of the signing of the United Nations Charter)
- Liberty Island ("Sweet Liberty" official painting of the 100th Anniversary, housed within the [Statue of Liberty National Monument])
- National Park Service (numerous installations across the western United States)

== Publications ==
- Sumner, George (1999). Fall Arts Festival Artist Biography. Sausalito, California: George Sumner Studios, Inc. p. 1.
