= Operation Hardboiled =

1942 military deception operation

- Part of World War II
- Operational scope: Operational
- Type: Military deception
- Location: 58.57°N 5.43°E
- Planned: 1942
- Planned by: London Controlling Section
- Objective: German belief in an amphibious invasion of Stavanger, Norway
- Executed by: Royal Marines Division
- Outcome: Limited success
- The operation targeted Stavanger, Norway

Operation Hardboiled was a Second World War military deception. Undertaken by the Allies in 1942, it was the first attempt at deception by the London Controlling Section (LCS) and was designed to convince the Axis powers that the Allies would soon invade German-occupied Norway. The LCS had recently been established to plan deception across all theatres, but had struggled for support from the unenthusiastic military establishment. The LCS had little guidance in strategic deception, an activity pioneered by Dudley Clarke the previous year, and was unaware of the extensive double agent system controlled by MI5. As a result, Hardboiled was planned as a real operation rather than a fictional one. Clarke had already found this approach to be wasteful in time and resources, preferring to present a "story" using agents and wireless traffic.

Resistance to the operation by the chosen units meant that much of the preparation was not completed. Adolf Hitler ordered the reinforcement of Scandinavia in March and April 1942, before Hardboiled was shelved in May. It is unclear to what extent the operation contributed to his decision. Despite its limited impact, the operation gave the LCS experience in planning deceptions, and laid the groundwork for future exploitation of Hitler's belief that Northern Europe was strategically important.

== Background ==
Strategic deception was a new topic for the Allies, having been pioneered in 1941 in Cairo by Dudley Clarke and his Advanced Headquarters 'A' Force. Following a presentation in September by Clarke, the Joint Planning Staff of the British War Ministry decided that a special organisation should be set up to plan and execute deception operations. They recommended that a "controlling section" be set up to oversee strategic deception planning, which would then be put into practice at the operational level by the armed services. The idea was approved and Clarke was offered the role. After he declined, the Chiefs of Staff chose Colonel Oliver Stanley, the former Secretary of State for War, as the new Controlling Officer.

Stanley had great difficulty in convincing the Allied military establishment, which was sceptical of strategic deception and resistant to the idea of a central planning authority, to take part in an operation. Despite obtaining a few staff officers, the London Controlling Section (LCS) was, in the words of one member, in a state of "near impotence". In December 1941 Stanley received permission to plan the LCS's first operation, following several months of pressure on the Allied command.

== Planning ==
Royal Marines, the unit chosen for Hardboiled, training in deep snow during March 1942

Hardboiled had no specific goal for the Allies, other than to convince the Germans of an imminent invasion threat against Norway. Clarke had established that deception operations should have a clear idea of what the enemy was supposed to do (rather than what they were expected to think). Stanley was unaware of this, not being in communication with Clarke's department in Cairo. The objective for Hardboiled was chosen because the resources existed and it would not affect real operations (planners had already rejected Norway as a viable target), rather than for any strategic advantage it brought the Allies. Stanley also lacked knowledge of the extensive double agent network under the control of the Twenty Committee, having merely been told that MI5 had an avenue through which to pass information to the enemy. The department was unaware that no uncontrolled German operatives were active in Britain and so incorrectly believed that a deception would have to be highly realistic to appear genuine.

Stanley at first proposed that the notional target should be Narvik or Trondheim. Allied commanders decided these were implausible targets because of their northern location and an amphibious landing at Stavanger was chosen, based on planning for Operation Dynamite (a rejected invasion of Norway). The date of the fictional invasion was set for 1 May 1942. Hardboiled was planned as a real operation, involving training and troop movements, culminating in the embarkation of a fictitious invasion. The plan relied on German intelligence, rumour and leaks to convey the deception to the opponents. Clarke and 'A' Force had already discovered that realistic training was wasteful, that much of the effort could be falsified using agents and wireless traffic. The LCS lacked guidance from Cairo and so made many of the same mistakes. Before the operation could begin, Stanley had one final objection; he found the code name Hardboiled "silly". LCS member Dennis Wheatley had picked it from a book of codewords and explained to Stanley (who was unaware) that the name had been randomly selected so as to bear no relation to the operation's aims.

== Operation ==
To get what we wanted done meant putting these people to a great deal of trouble, and very few could be persuaded that it was worth it. Some of them took no pains to hide their view that this newfangled business of strategic deception was a crack-brained idea upon which there was no justification for wasting the time of busy men like themselves.

— Dennis Wheatley

The Royal Marines Division were earmarked for Hardboiled, trained in mountain warfare, and given cold weather equipment. Realistic invasion plans were drawn up and Norwegian currency was stockpiled. These preparations met with considerable resistance from the armed forces, who considered the operation to be a waste of effort. The need for soldiers in real operations and training meant that, in the end, a lot of the preparations never occurred. The LCS attempted passive deception as part of Hardboiled. Agents canvassed Norwegian refugees for information about Stavanger and for possible interpreters. The hope was that rumours would reach neutral countries and filter back to the German intelligence network. Some deception was also passed on via agents.

== Impact ==
Hardboiled petered out as the Royal Marines were required for an amphibious operation in Madagascar in July 1942. It had appeared effective, as during April and May the Germans had reinforced Norway. The historian, Joshua Levine, notes that Hitler had a "near-obsession with defence of Scandinavia" during this period and that it is unclear how much the operation had contributed to his strategy. Michael Howard, who wrote the official British history of strategic deception, attributes the lacklustre response to the defeats the Allies were suffering on every front, and writes that it is difficult to imagine the Germans believing that a big offensive operation was being planned.

The operation was a failure; Howard notes that it provided experience for the planners in handling deception and for the Twenty Committee in proving the worth of double agents. Terry Crowdy, writing in 2008, argued that any experience that the LCS attained was limited by the lack of guidance from Cairo and knowledge of double agents. Dudley Clarke had already shown that the most effective method of deception involved the use of agents and faked wireless traffic, rather than big training and troop movements. Hardboiled was the first deception plan aimed at Norway. It led into several others, including Operation Tindall and Operation Solo, culminating in the 1944 Operation Fortitude North, one of the Allies' largest and most successful deceptions. In May 1942, John Bevan replaced Stanley as head of the LCS, after he had re-entered politics. The committee was given much broader powers. Hardboiled was sidelined by the new regime, and had been dropped entirely from the LCS programme by the end of May.
