= Second Quebec Conference =

1944 wartime meeting of the UK and US governments in Canada

Second Quebec Conference Octagon
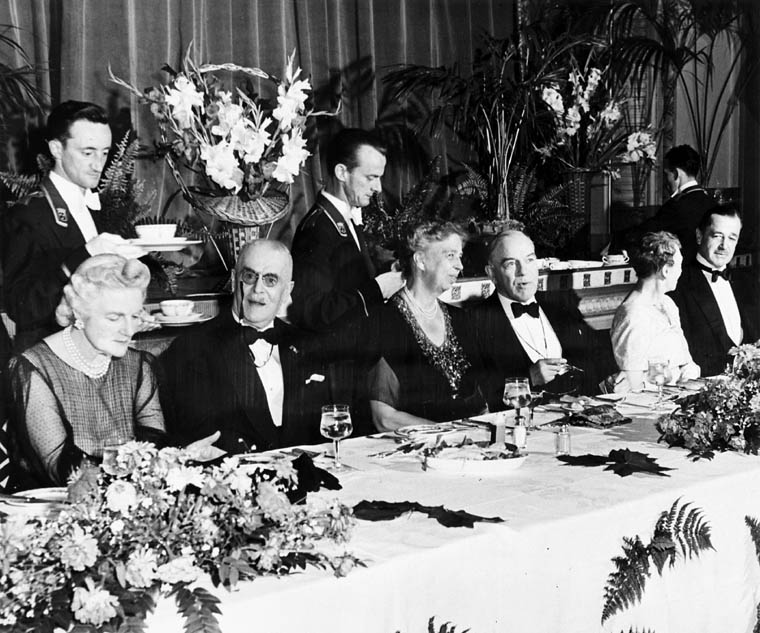
- The Prime Minister's Reception hosted at the Château Frontenac
- Host country: Canada
- Date: September 12–16, 1944
- Cities: Quebec City, Quebec
- Participants: United Kingdom; United States

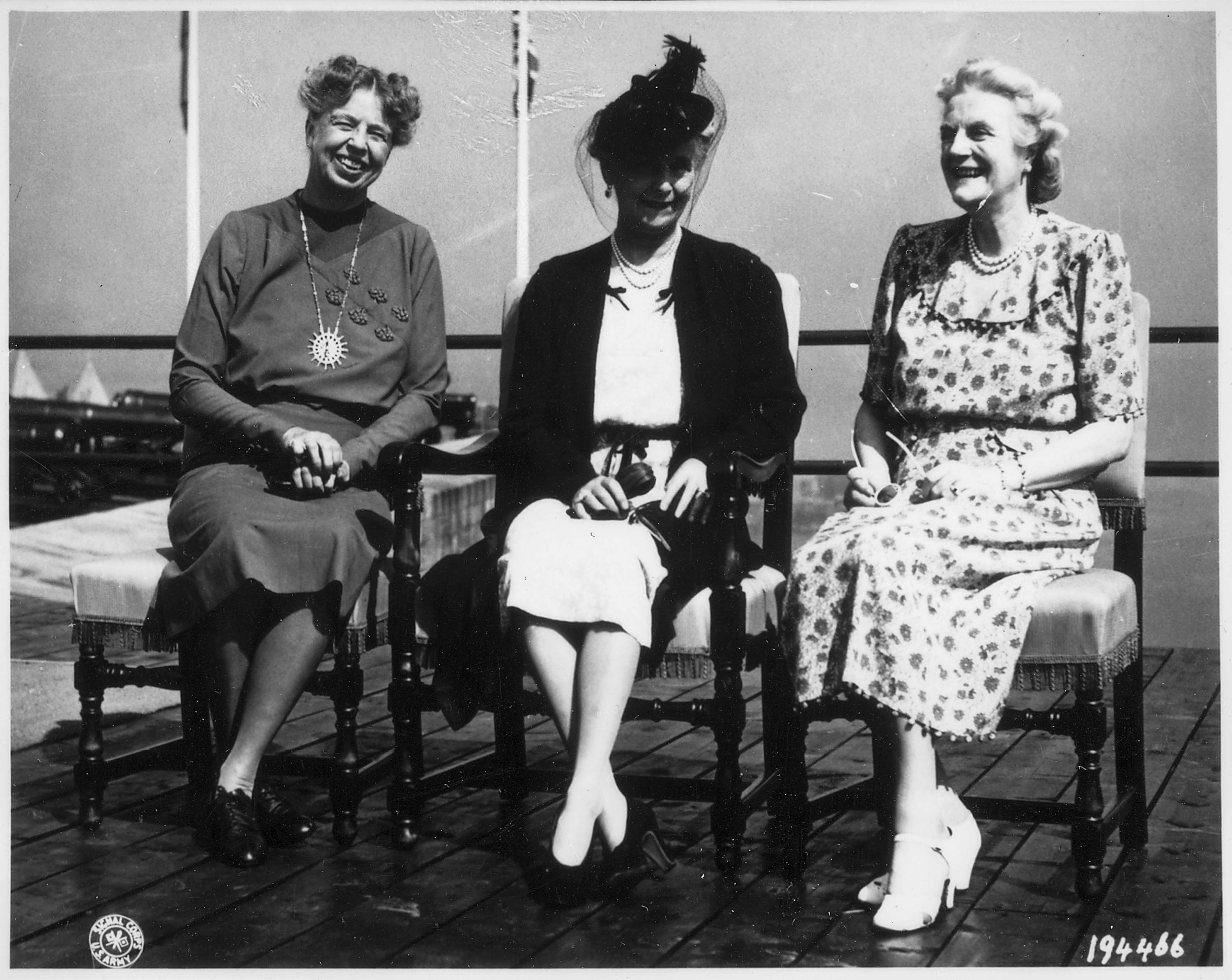
Eleanor Roosevelt, Princess Alice, and Clementine Churchill during the conference.

The Second Quebec Conference (codenamed "OCTAGON") was a high-level military conference held during World War II by the British and American governments. The conference was held in Quebec City, September 12 – September 16, 1944, and was the second conference to be held in Quebec, after "QUADRANT" in August 1943. The chief representatives were Winston Churchill, Franklin D. Roosevelt and the Combined Chiefs of Staff. Canada's Prime Minister William Lyon Mackenzie King was the host but did not attend the key meetings.

Agreements were reached on the following topics: Allied occupation zones in defeated Germany, the Morgenthau Plan to demilitarize Germany, continued U.S. Lend-Lease aid to Britain, and the role of the Royal Navy in the war against Japan. Based on the Hyde Park Aide-Mémoire, they made plans to drop the atomic bomb on Japan.

== See also ==
- First Quebec Conference
- List of Allied World War II conferences

== General references ==
- U.S. Secretary of the Combined Chiefs of Staff, ed. (1944). Papers and Minutes of Meetings of OCTAGON Conference and Minutes of Combined Chiefs of Staff Meetings in London, June 1944 (PDF). Combined Chiefs of Staff. ISBN 1-0755-1300-6. Wikidata Q130353290. Archived (PDF) from the original on September 23, 2024.
