= First Quebec Conference =

1943 Allied conference during World War II

First Quebec Conference Quadrant
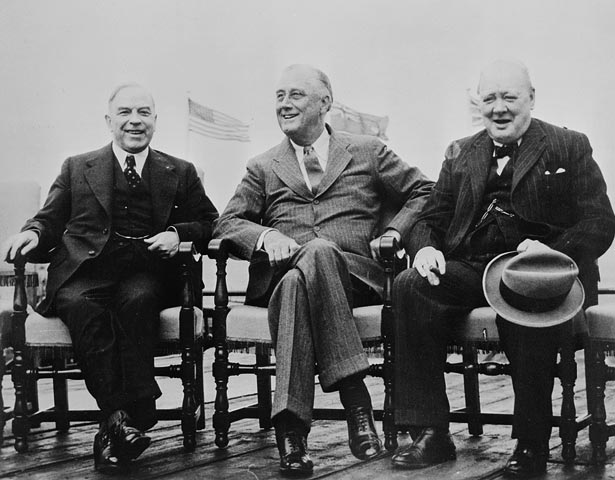
- Mackenzie King, Franklin D. Roosevelt and Winston Churchill at the First Quebec Conference
- Host country: Canada
- Date: August 17–24, 1943
- Cities: Quebec City, Quebec
- Venues: Citadelle of Quebec; Château Frontenac
- Participants: Canada (as host); United Kingdom; United States

The First Quebec Conference, codenamed Quadrant, was a highly secret military conference held during World War II by the governments of the United Kingdom, Canada, and the United States. It took place in Quebec City on August 17–24, 1943, at both the Citadelle and the Château Frontenac. The chief representatives were Winston Churchill and Franklin D. Roosevelt, hosted by the Canadian prime minister William Lyon Mackenzie King.

== Conference ==
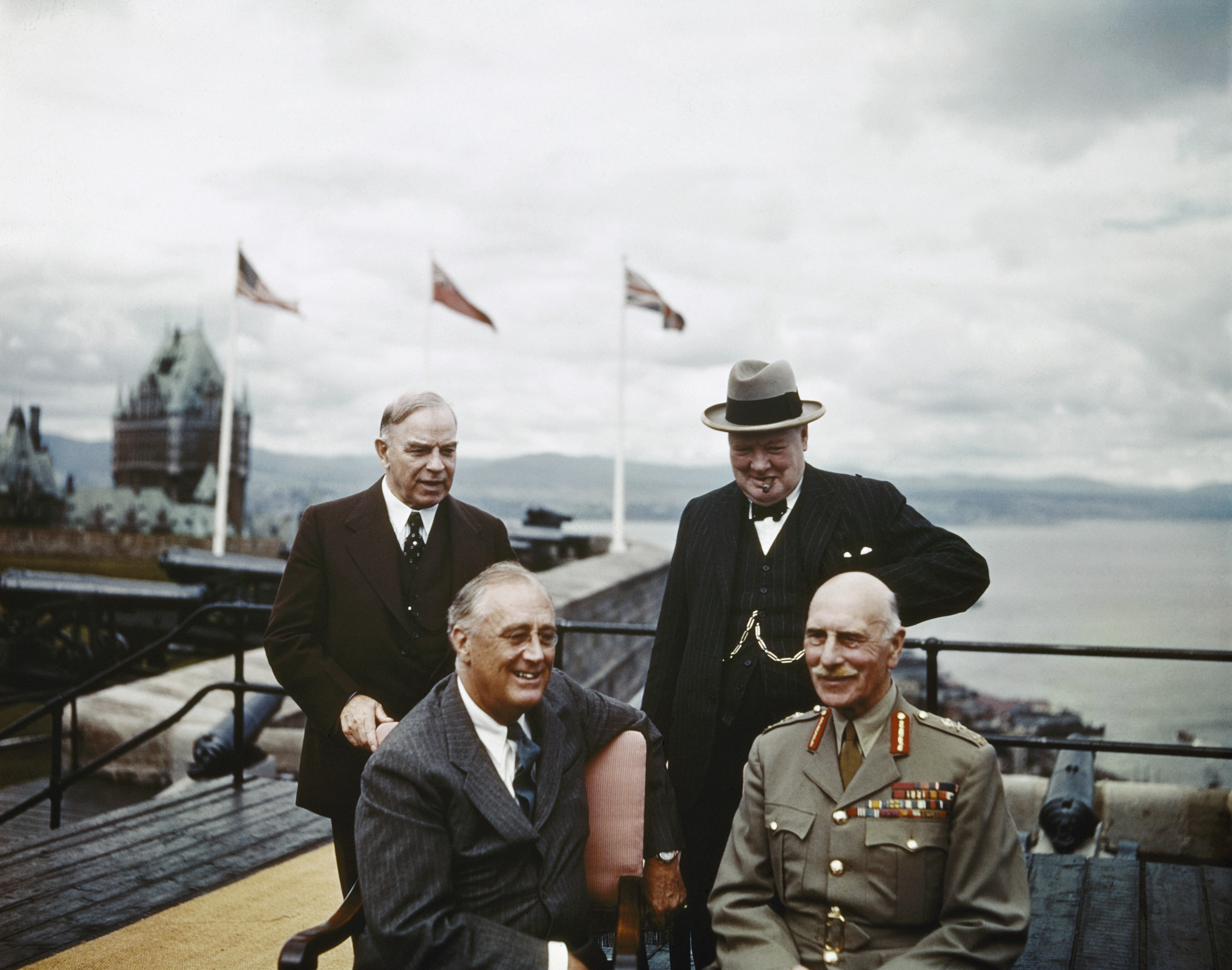
Mackenzie King, Franklin D. Roosevelt, Winston Churchill, and the Earl of Athlone at La Citadelle in Quebec City

Although Churchill suggested that Mackenzie King be involved in all discussions, Roosevelt vetoed the idea owing to concern that future conferences would be burdened by all of the Allied nations demanding seats. As a result, Mackenzie King's hospitality was almost purely for ceremonial purposes. Joseph Stalin, leader of the Soviet Union, had been invited to join the conference, but he did not attend for military reasons.

The Allies agreed to begin discussions for the planning of the invasion of France, codenamed Operation Overlord, in a secret report by the Combined Chiefs of Staff. It was agreed that Overlord would commence on May 1, 1944, but this was subsequently disregarded, and a later date was finalised. However, Overlord was not the only option; for example, Operation Jupiter remained a strong possibility had the Germans proved too powerful on the French coast. In the Mediterranean (a theatre on which Churchill was very keen) they resolved to concentrate more force to remove Italy from the alliance of Axis powers and to occupy it along with Corsica. Churchill and Roosevelt made it clear that they would only accept unconditional surrender from Italy, with a complete and immediate cessation of fighting. News came through of the fall of Sicily to Allied forces, an invasion that had taken just 38 days. It was then decided that an invasion of Italy would begin on September 3, 1943. However, an armistice was signed that same day, which officially put Italy out of the war.

There were discussions about improving the co-ordination of efforts by the Americans, British, and Canadians to develop an atomic bomb. Churchill and Roosevelt, without Canadian input, signed the Quebec Agreement, stating that the nuclear technology would never be used against one another, that they would not use it against third parties without the consent of one another, but also that Tube Alloys would not be discussed with third parties. Canada, although not being represented at the particular meeting, played a key role in this agreement as it was a major source of uranium and heavy water, both essential in the atomic bomb.

It was decided that operations in the Balkans should be limited to supplying guerrillas, whereas operations against Japan would be intensified in order to exhaust Japanese resources, cut their communications lines, and secure forward bases from which the Japanese mainland could be attacked.

In addition to the strategic discussions, which were communicated to the Soviet Union and to Chiang Kai-shek in China, the conference also issued a joint statement on Palestine, intended to calm tensions as the British occupation was becoming increasingly untenable. The conference also condemned German atrocities in Poland.

In the Pacific theatre, the conference decided to bypass and isolate Rabaul rather than proceed with the original plan of taking Rabaul. This decision fulfilled General Douglas MacArthur's plan to neutralise the heavily fortified fortress of Rabaul in New Britain. MacArthur's Operation Cartwheel led to the creation of a de facto prisoner-of-war camp of over 100,000 Japanese troops who were cut off from the rest of their forces.

In parallel with the military discussions, U.S. Secretary of State Cordell Hull held a private meeting with British Foreign Secretary Anthony Eden, where both expressed opposition to the forcible dismemberment of Germany, favouring a more restrained postwar settlement.

It was clear that eliminating Italy from the war was the Allies' main priority; this was expected to be done by the end of 1943. Following this, the next hope was that Germany would be defeated by the autumn of 1944, which would leave just Japan remaining among the Axis powers.

Following the conference, Churchill was on holiday at a fishing camp and then, on August 31, 1943, delivered a radio address before travelling by a special train that was going to Washington, D.C., to resume talks with Roosevelt.

== Gallery ==
On August 18, 1943 at the first Quebec Conference. (Seated: King, Roosevelt, Churchill)

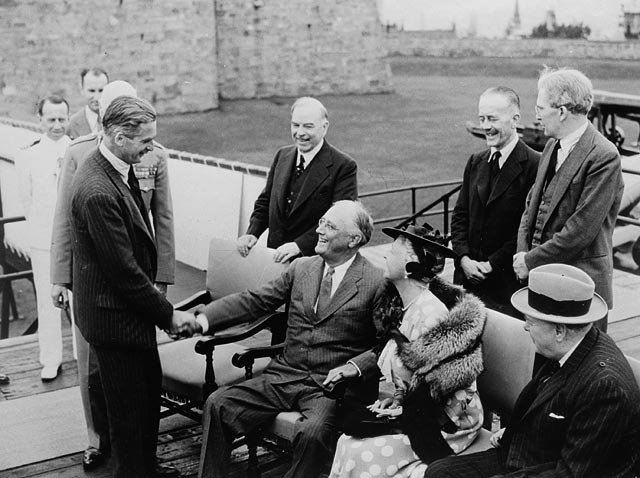
President Roosevelt, seated next to Princess Alice and Prime Minister King of Canada, greeting British Foreign Secretary Anthony Eden.

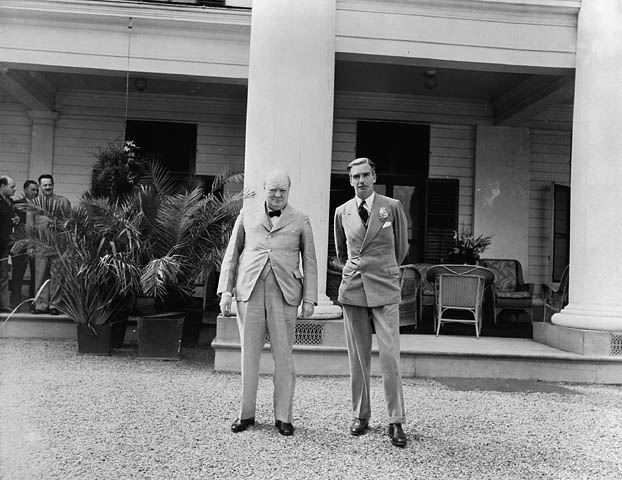
British Prime Minister Winston Churchill and Foreign Secretary Anthony Eden

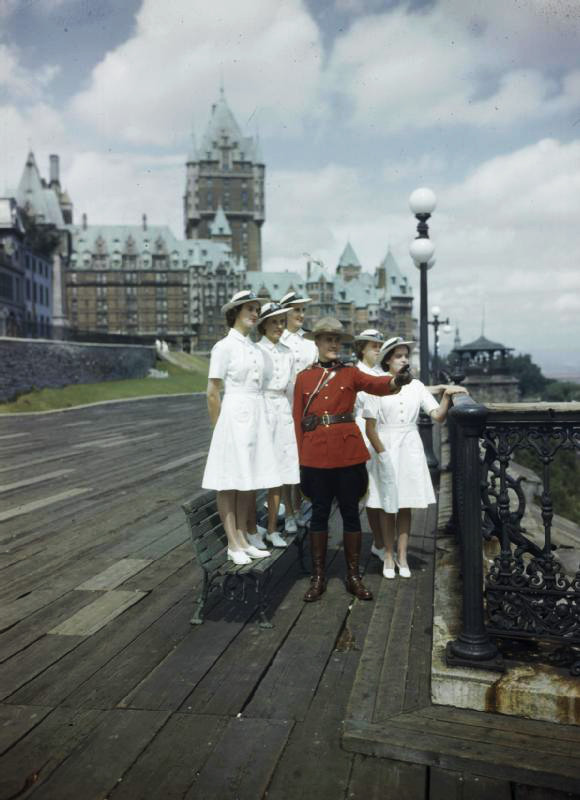
Women's Royal Naval Service officers sightseeing after the conference

== Misplaced portfolio ==
Given the highly secret topic under discussion at the conference, security at the Château Frontenac and the Quebec Citadelle was important.

Sgt. Maj. Émile Couture (then 25 years of age) of the Canadian Army was responsible for cleaning the offices at both of these locations after the Conference had ended. Couture found a leather portfolio with a gold inscription "Churchill-Roosevelt, Quebec Conference, 1943." on the exterior and kept it as a souvenir, not realizing that it contained nearly complete plans for Operation Overlord. That evening Couture discovered the contents of the portfolio and, realizing the extremely sensitive nature of those documents, hid the portfolio under his mattress until he could return the portfolio in the morning. Couture was investigated by Scotland Yard and the FBI to ensure none of the information had been leaked.

At the Second Quebec Conference, Couture was awarded the British Empire Medal for his silence though it was attributed for "services rendered". Couture was interviewed on Radio-Canada's radio programme Appelez-moi Lise by Lise Payette in 1972 about this issue. Additional magazine interviews with Couture are on display at the permanent exhibit for both Quebec Conferences in the Quebec Citadelle after September 2019.

== See also ==
- Second Quebec Conference
- List of Allied World War II conferences
- Manhattan Project
