= Château Haldimand =

Former castle in Quebec City, Canada

Coordinates: 46°48′43″N 71°12′18″W

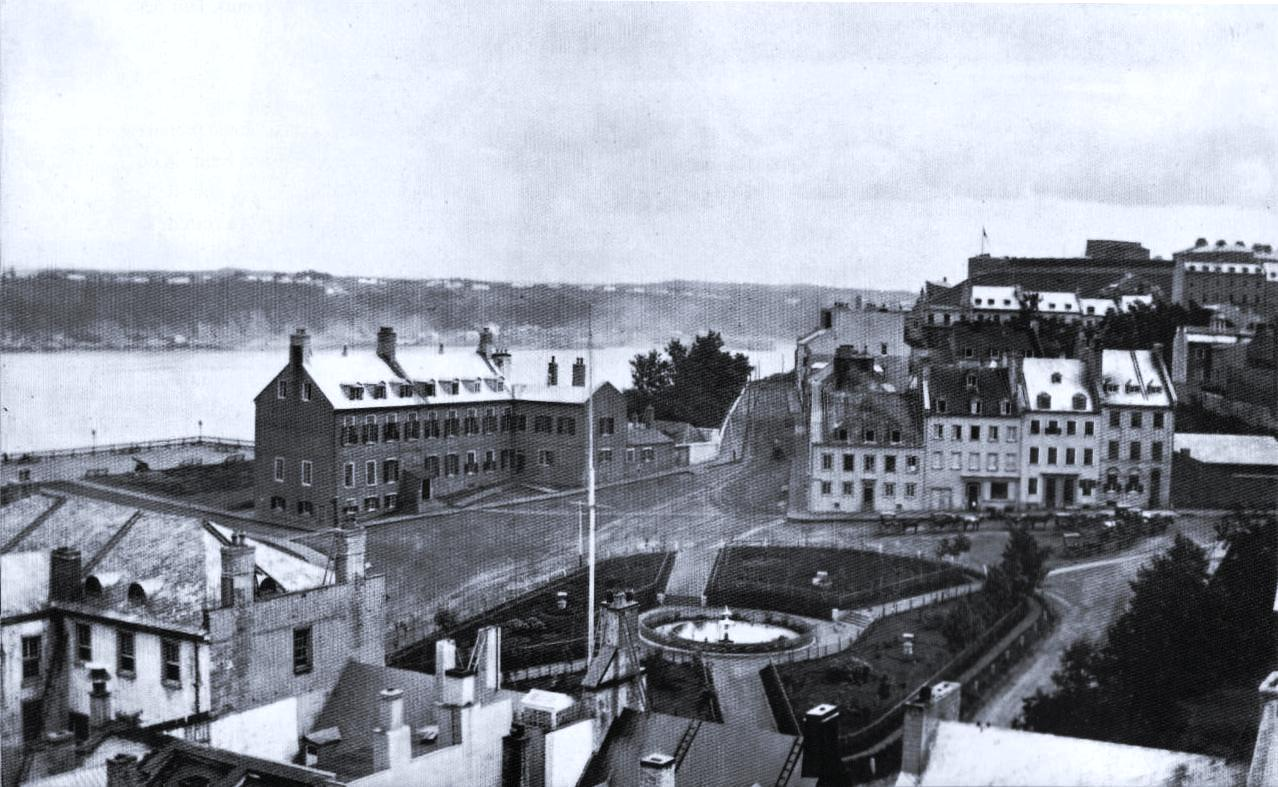
Château Haldimand and the Place d'Armes, 1866

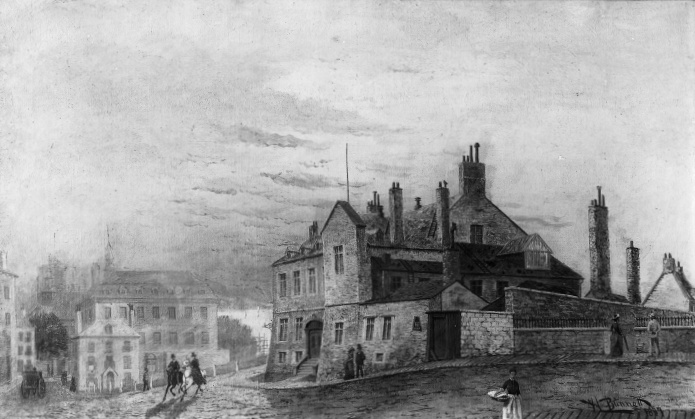
Château Haldimand, Henry R. Bunnett, 1887

The Château Haldimand was a castle that stood where the Château Frontenac now stands in Quebec City, Quebec, Canada. The building was constructed between 1784 and 1786.

== History ==
In 1784, Quebec Governor Frederick Haldimand ordered construction of the château. It became the seat of the colonial government of the province of Quebec from 1786 to 1791.

In 1860, the Canadian government established administrative offices and the headquarters of the Legislative Assembly of Canada in the castle until 1866.

The castle was later used as part of Laval University until 1892, when it was demolished to make way for the construction of the Château Frontenac.
