= Château Ramezay =

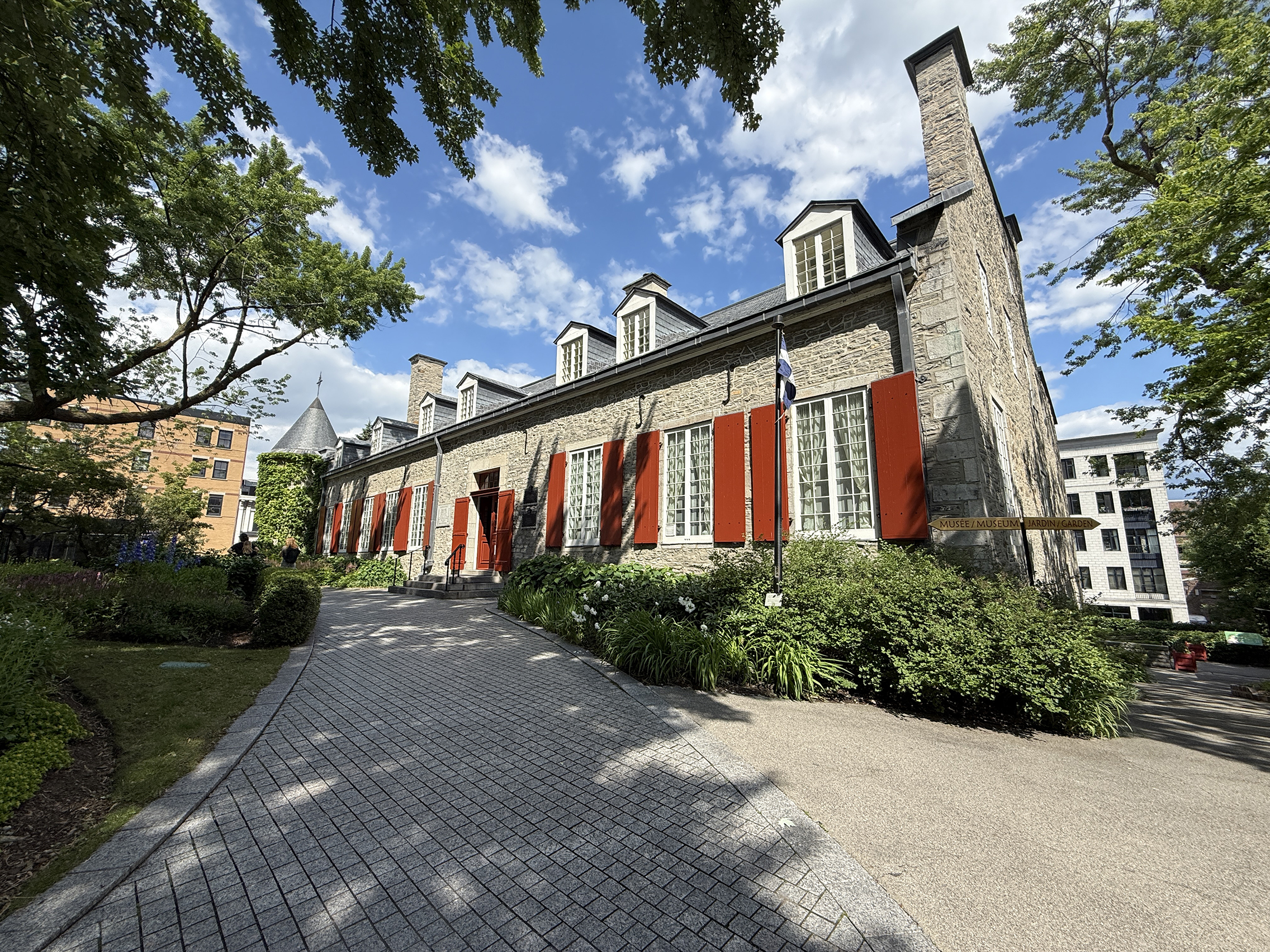
- Established: 1705
- Location: 280, rue Notre-Dame Est; Montreal, Quebec; H2Y 1C5
- Coordinates: 45°30′31″N 73°33′12″W
- Type: museum and historic building
- Website: www.chateauramezay.qc.ca/en/

National Historic Site of Canada
- Official name: Château De Ramezay / India House National Historic Site of Canada
- Designated: 1949

Patrimoine culturel du Québec
- Type: Monument historique classé
- Designated: 1929

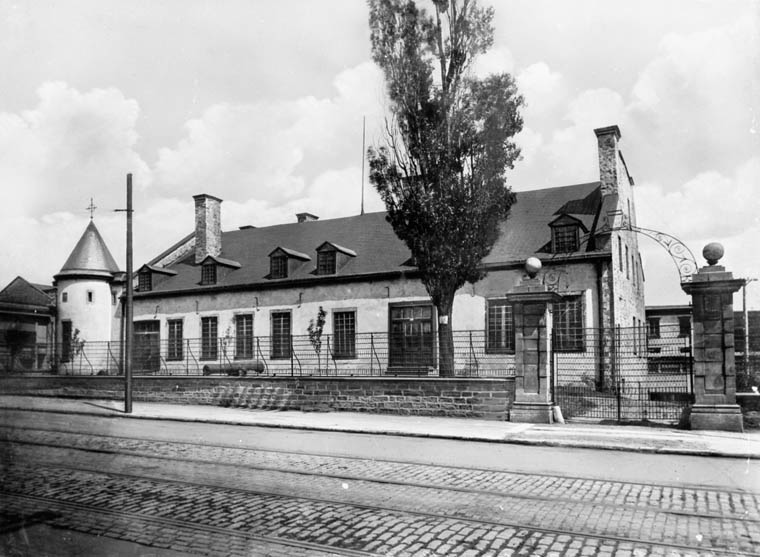
Château Ramezay, 1900-1925

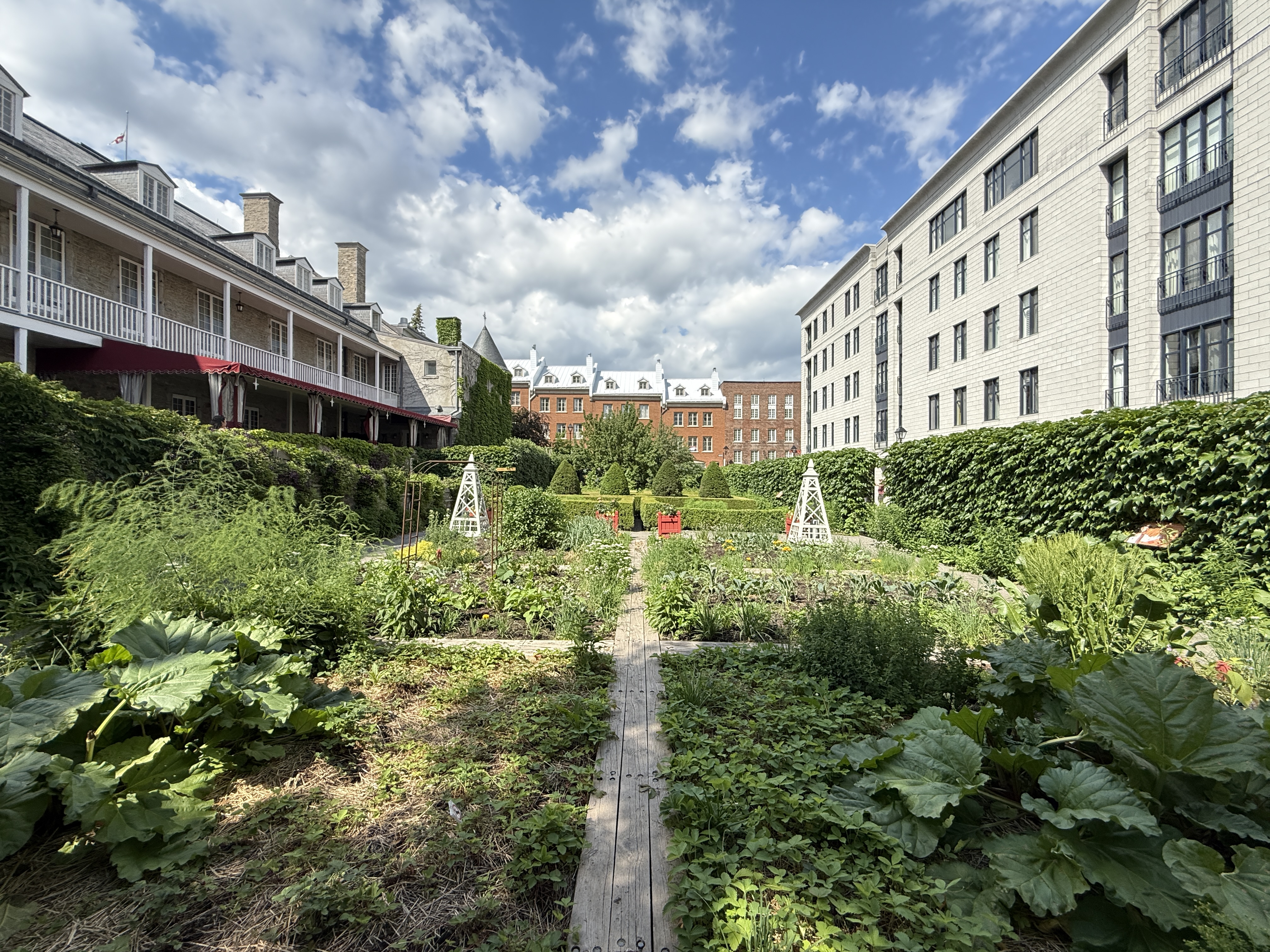
Château Ramezay's gardens

The Château Ramezay is a museum and historic building on Notre-Dame Street in Old Montreal, opposite Montreal City Hall in Montreal, Quebec, Canada.

Built in 1705 as the residence of then-governor of Montreal, Claude de Ramezay, the Château was the first building proclaimed as a historical monument in Quebec and is the province's oldest private history museum. It was designated a National Historic Sites of Canada in 1949.

Over the years, the Château changed owners and functions several times, with Ramezay's descendants selling the manor to the fur-trading Compagnie des Indes.

== Continental army headquarters ==
From 1775, it became the Canadian headquarters for the Continental Army when it seized Montreal. Benjamin Franklin stayed there overnight in 1776, while trying to raise troops to fight for the Americans in the American Revolutionary War.

== Governor's residence again ==
After the conquest until 1849 the house was again used as a governor's residence, this time by the British governors. For official purposes it was known as Government House and was the governor's official Montreal residence which complemented his other residence in Quebec City (the Chateau St. Louis), and a country retreat in Sorel.

== University building ==
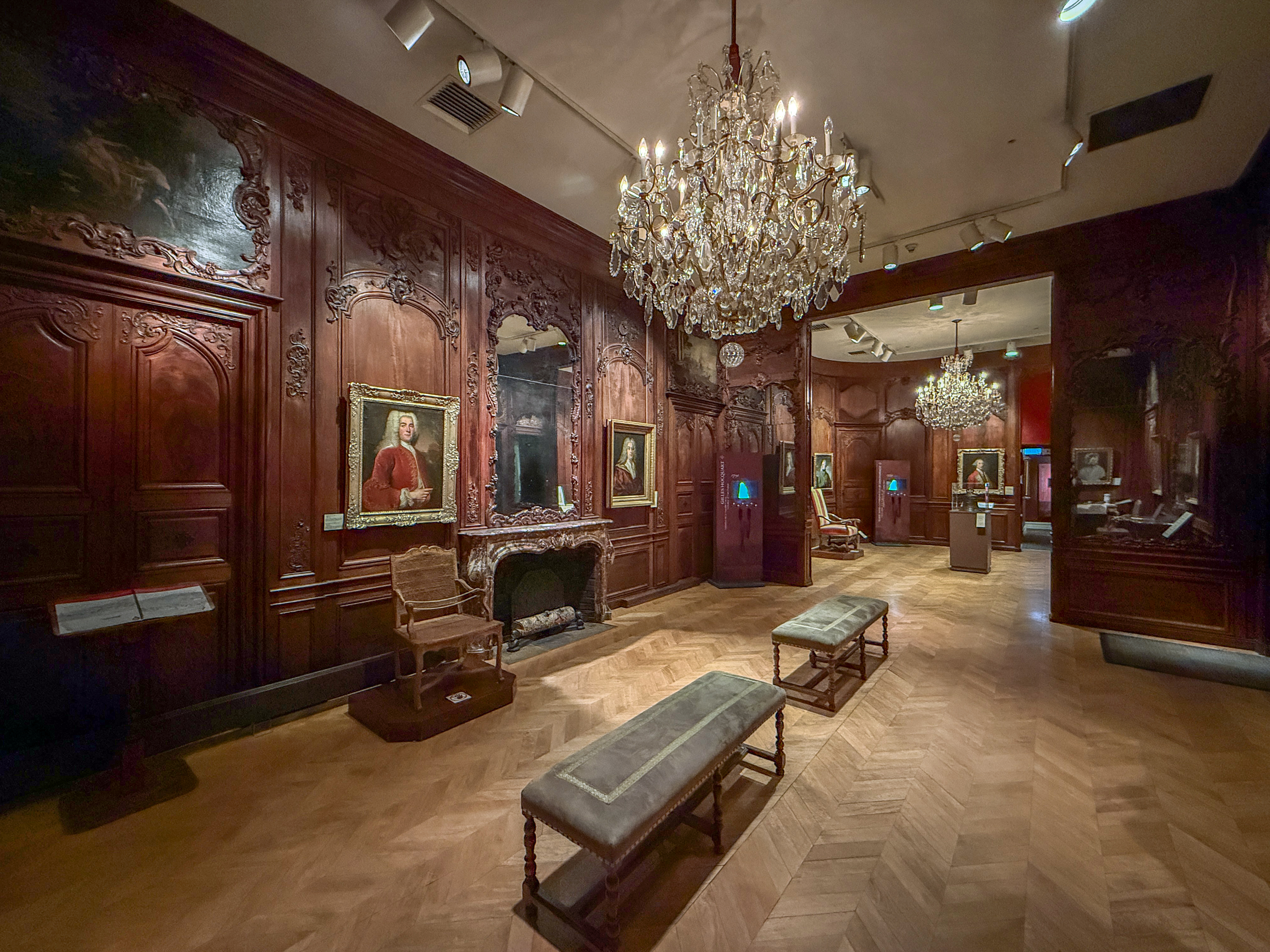
Ramezay salon

In 1878, the building opened its doors to host Université de Montréal's first Faculty of Medicine.

== Museum ==
The building was bought by the Numismatic and Antiquarian Society of Montreal and converted into an historical museum and portrait gallery in 1894. Sir Andrew Taylor designed alterations to the Chateau in 1895.

Today, the museum's collection is composed mainly of gifts from private Montrealers and is estimated at 30,000 objects, including manuscripts, printed works, numismatic items, ethnological items, works of art, paintings, prints and furniture.

From 1997 to 2002, the Château Ramezay underwent indoor and outdoor restorations, including the creation of the Governor's Garden, inaugurated in 2000. In 2003, the Château Ramezay Museum earned the National Award of Excellence from the Landscape Architects of Canada. It has greeted more than a million visitors.

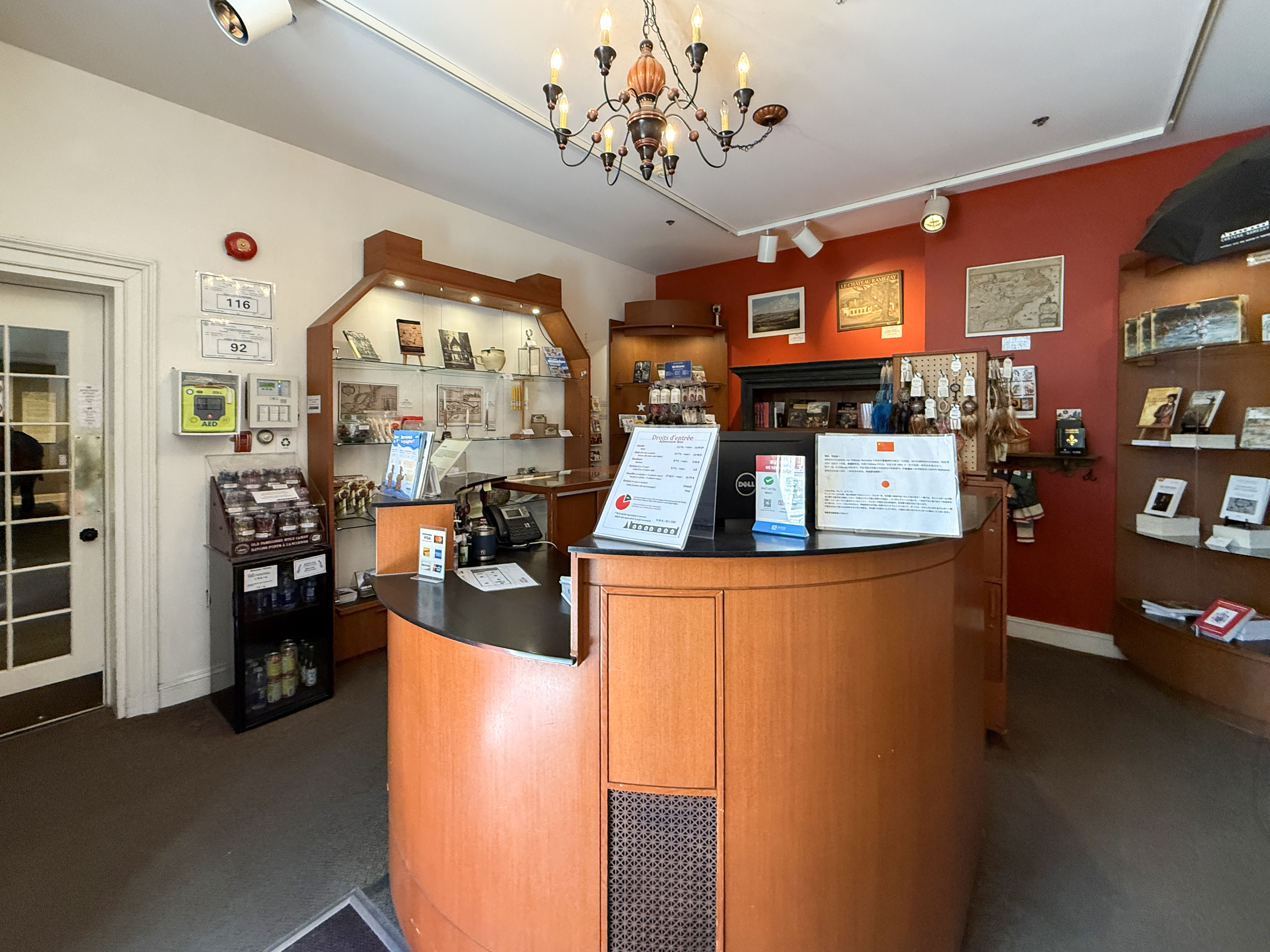
Reception

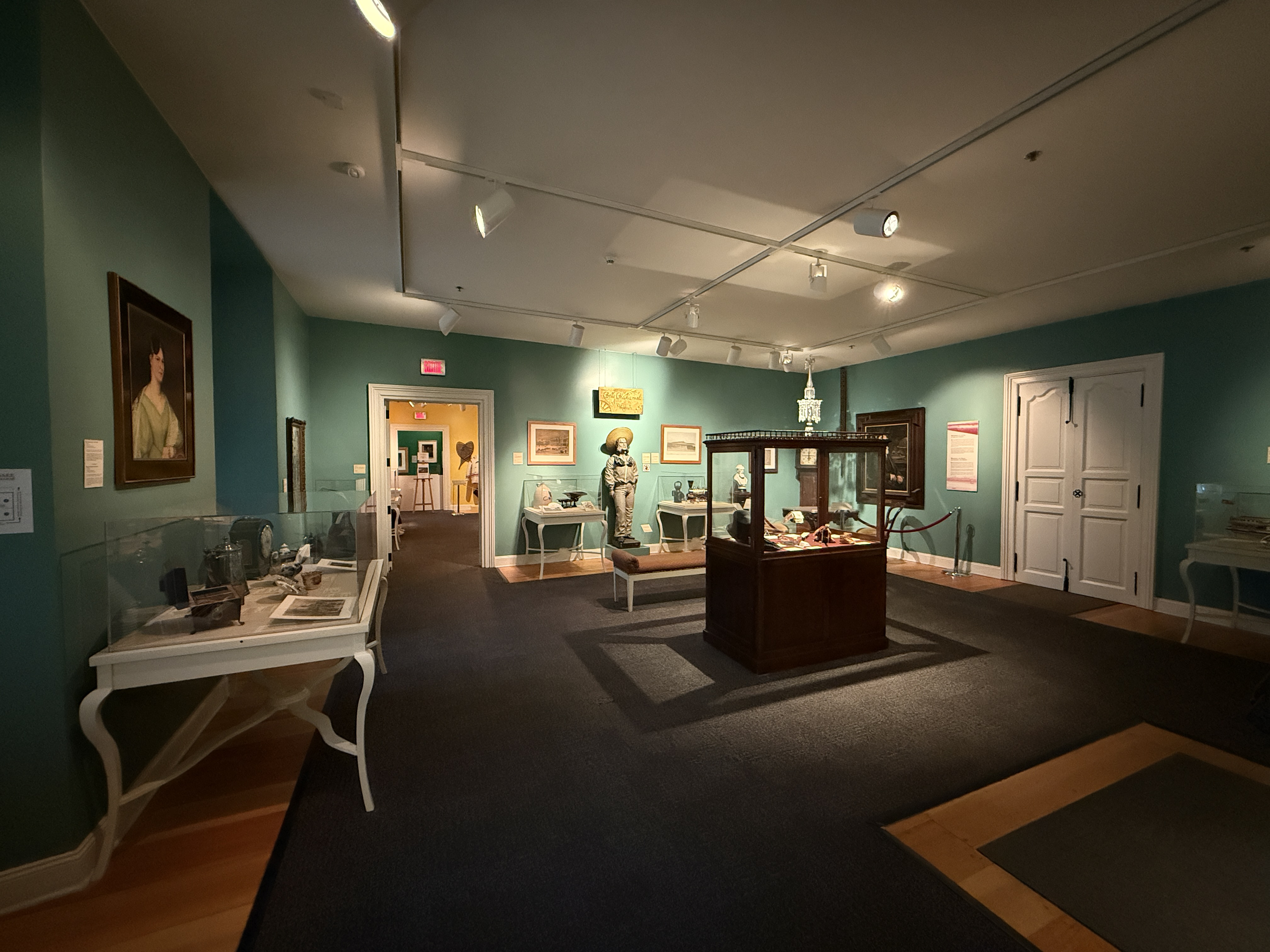
Hochelaga, ville-marie exhibition

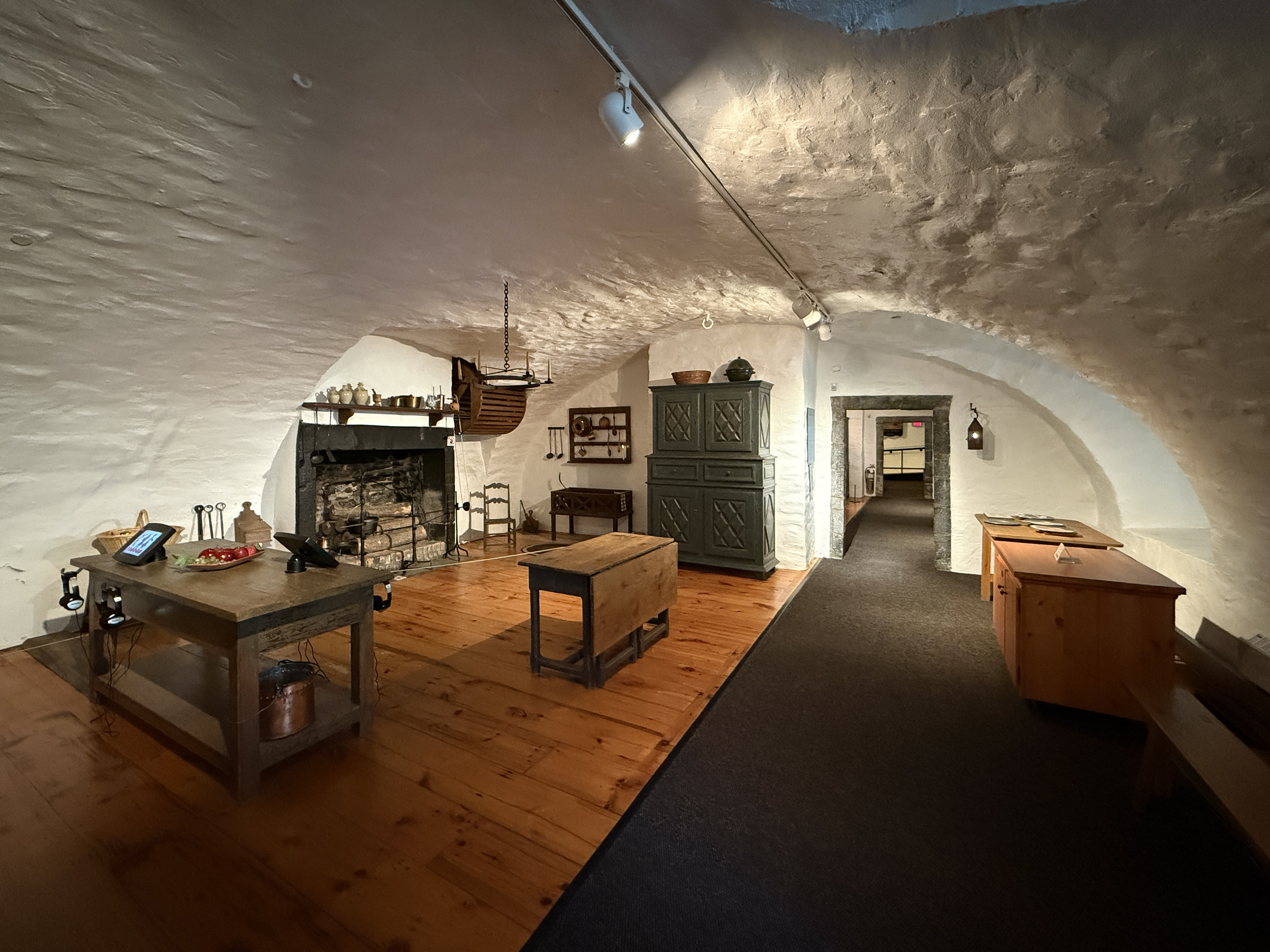
Basement kitchen

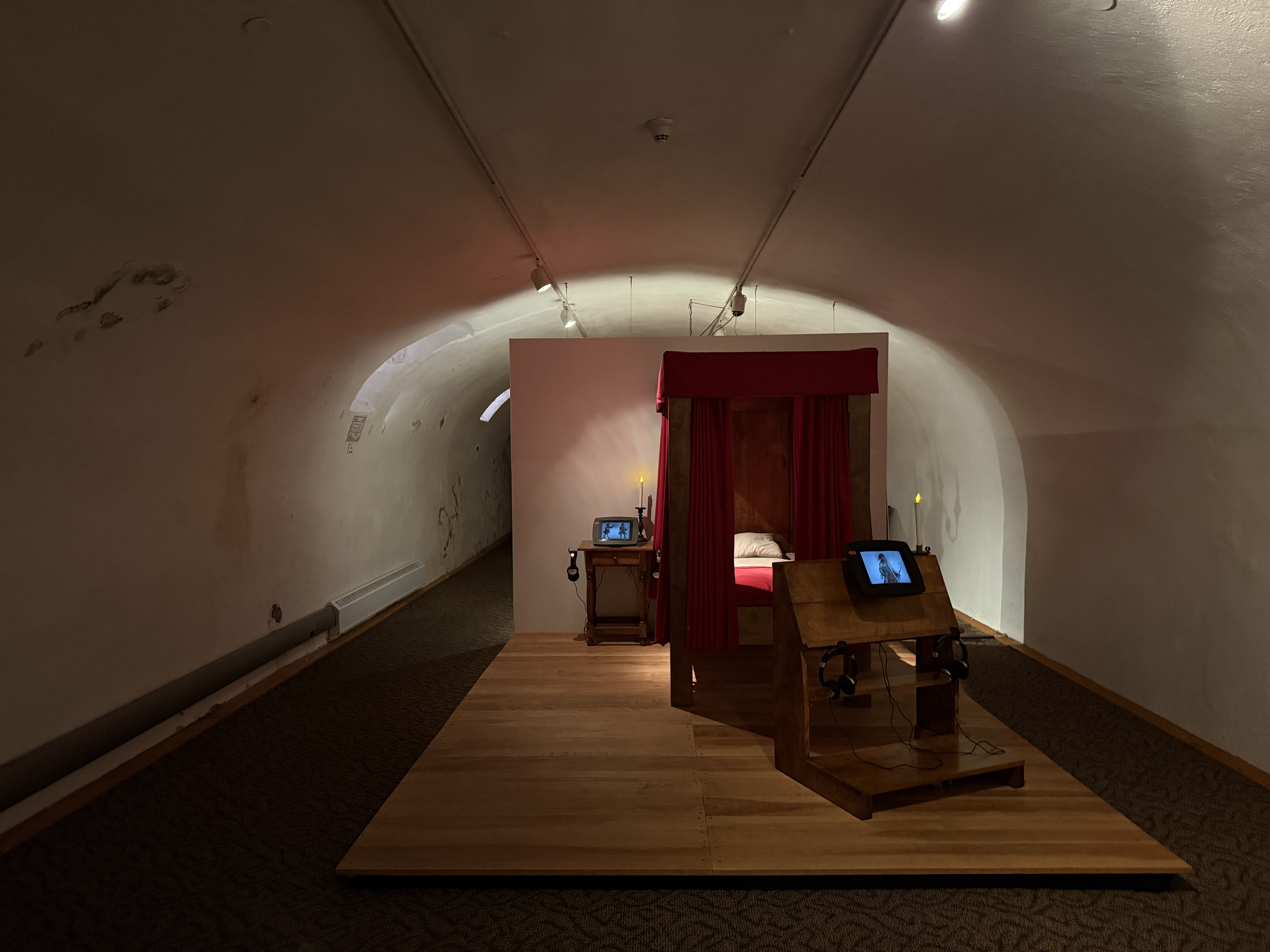
Basement Grade Manger Pantry
