= List of Roman Catholic archbishops of Quebec =

Archbishops of the Roman Catholic Archdiocese of Quebec

Archbishop of Quebec
- Archbishopric

catholic
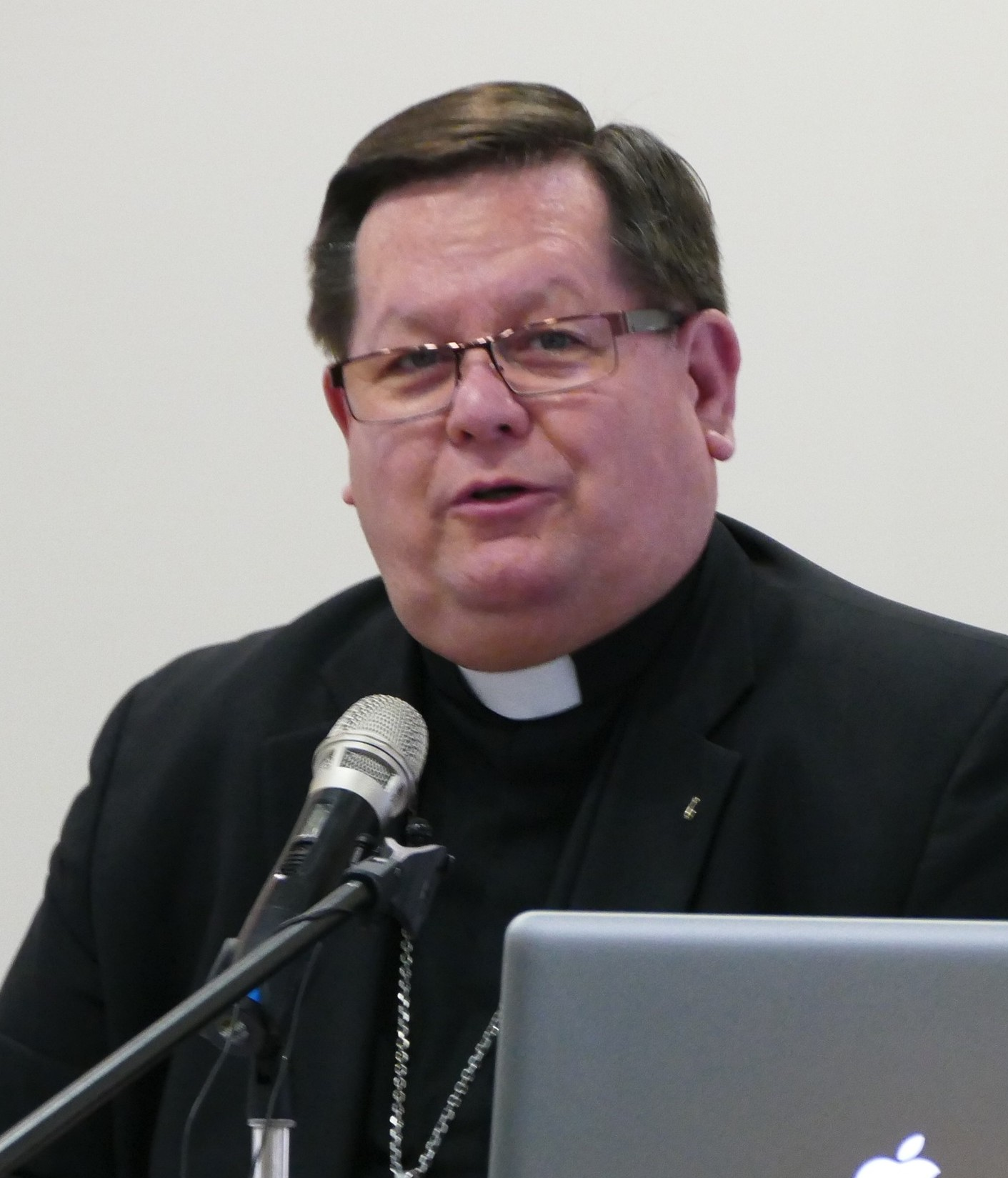
- Gérald Lacroix, the Archbishop of Quebec since 2011

- Coat of arms of the Archdiocese of Quebec
- Incumbent: Gérald Lacroix

Information
- First holder: François de Laval (apostolic vicar); Joseph-Octave Plessis (archbishop)
- Established: 1658 (apostolic vicariate); 1819 (archbishopric)
- Archdiocese: Quebec
- Cathedral: Cathedral-Basilica of Notre-Dame de Québec

Website
- Official website

The archbishop of Quebec is the head of the Roman Catholic Archdiocese of Quebec, who is responsible for looking after its spiritual and administrative needs. As the archdiocese is the metropolitan see of the ecclesiastical province encompassing the north-central part of the province of Quebec, the Archbishop of Quebec also administers the bishops who head the suffragan dioceses of Chicoutimi, Sainte-Anne-de-la-Pocatière, and Trois-Rivières. The current archbishop is Gérald Lacroix.

The archdiocese began as the Vicariate Apostolic of New France, which was created on April 11, 1658. François de Laval was appointed its first bishop, and under his reign, the Séminaire de Québec was established. On October 1, 1674, the vicariate was elevated to the status of diocese. It was raised to the level of archdiocese on January 12, 1819, and subsequently became a metropolitan see when the ecclesiastical province of Quebec was constituted in 1844. In recognition of its status as the first diocese north of Mexico and New Spain, the Archdiocese of Quebec was designated as the country's primatial see on January 24, 1956. Maurice Roy became the first archbishop to hold the honorific title of Primate of Canada.

Fifteen men have been Archbishop of Quebec; another ten were heads of its antecedent jurisdictions. Of these, seven were members of institutes of consecrated life or societies of apostolic life. Eight archbishops were elevated to the College of Cardinals. Louis-Philippe Mariauchau d'Esgly, the eighth ordinary of the archdiocese, was the first bishop to be born in Canada. His immediate successor, Jean-François Hubert, whose episcopacy spanned from 1788 to 1797, was the first bishop born in Quebec City. Jean-Baptiste de La Croix de Chevrières de Saint-Vallier had the longest tenure as Bishop of Quebec, serving for 39 years from 1688 to 1727, while Paul-Eugène Roy held the position for seven months (1925–1926), marking the shortest archiepiscopacy.

== List of ordinaries ==
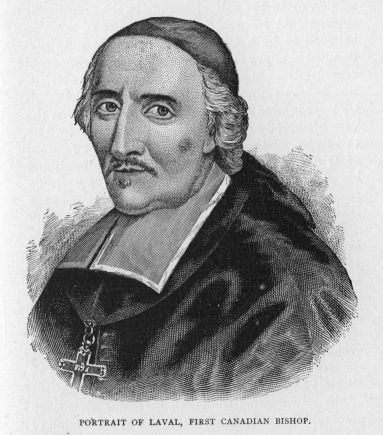
François de Laval was the first Apostolic Vicar of New France and Bishop of Quebec, reigning from 1658 to 1688.

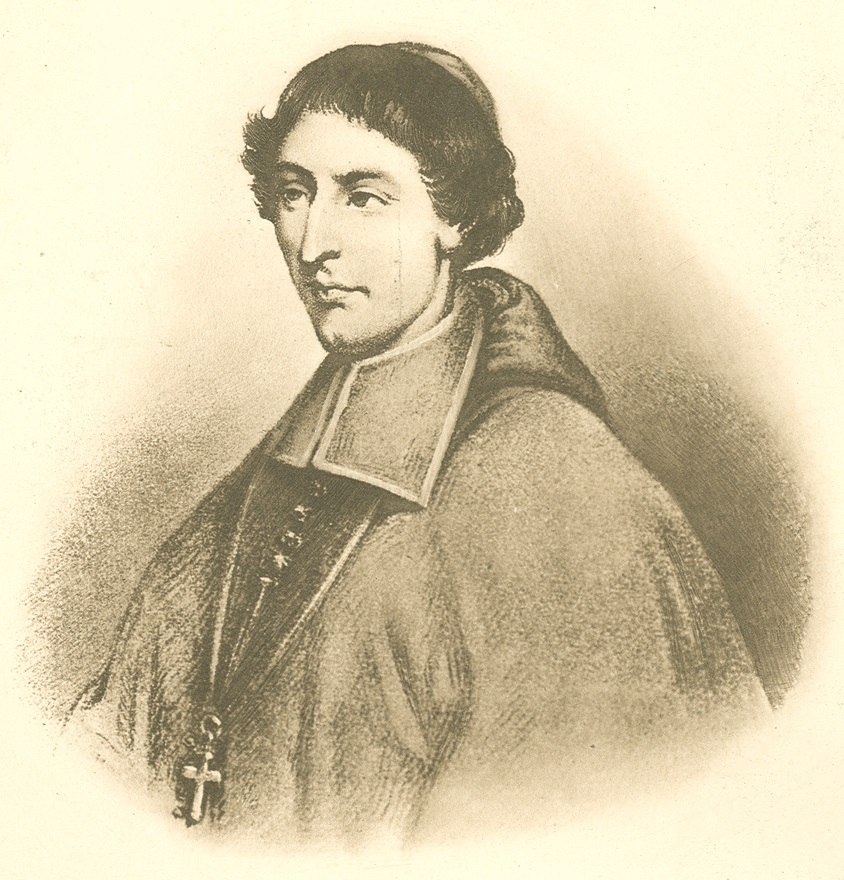
Jean-Baptiste de La Croix de Chevrières de Saint-Vallier was Bishop of Quebec for 39 years, serving from 1688 until his death in 1727.

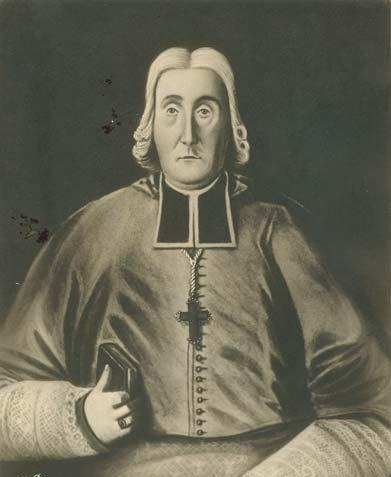
Louis-Philippe Mariauchau d'Esgly was the first Canadian-born bishop.

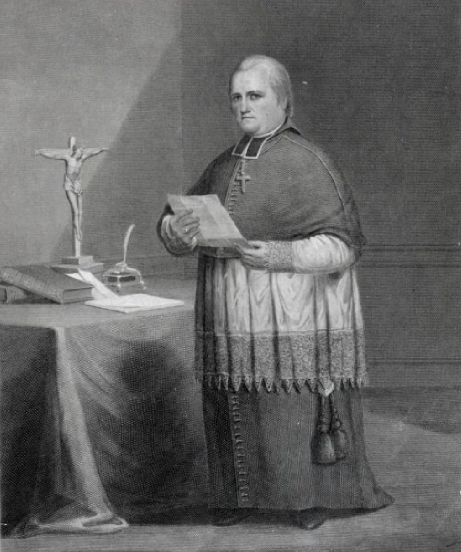
Joseph-Octave Plessis was the last Bishop of Quebec and its first archbishop.

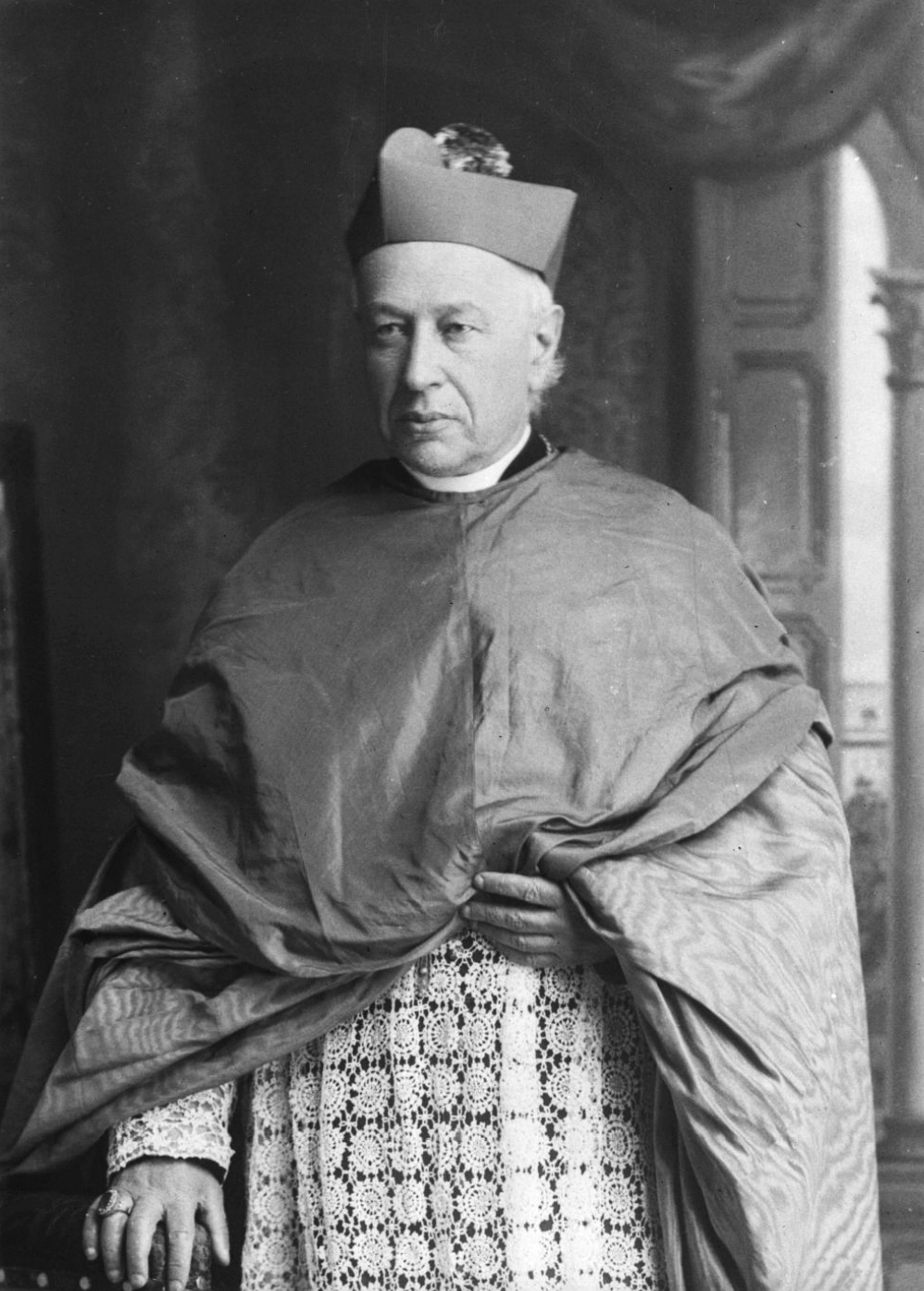
Elzéar-Alexandre Taschereau became the first Canadian-born cardinal in 1886.

Key
‡	Denotes archbishop who was elevated to the College of Cardinals
ISPX	Secular Institute Pius X
MEP	Paris Foreign Missions Society
OFM Cap	Order of Friars Minor Capuchin
OMI	Missionary Oblates of Mary Immaculate
OP	Dominican Order
PSS	Society of the Priests of Saint Sulpice
RSV	Religieux de Saint Vincent de Paul

=== Apostolic Vicars of New France ===
Apostolic Vicars
From	Until	Incumbent	Notes	Ref(s)
1658	1674	François de Laval, MEP	Appointed on April 11, 1658. Arrived in Quebec on June 16, 1659.	

=== Bishops of Quebec ===
Bishops
From	Until	Incumbent	Notes	Ref(s)
1674	1688	François de Laval, MEP	Became the first Bishop of Quebec on October 1, 1674. Resigned on January 24, 1688. (Note: After Laval's resignation was accepted, he acceded to staying on as bishop until his successor (Saint-Vallier) was consecrated. This is the date his resignation became official.) Died on May 6, 1708.	
1688	1727	Jean-Baptiste de La Croix de Chevrières de Saint-Vallier	Appointed on July 7, 1687. (Note: Saint-Vallier received episcopal consecration on January 25, 1688.) Arrived in Quebec on July 31, 1688. Died on December 26, 1727.	
1727	1733	Louis-François Duplessis de Mornay, OFM Cap	Coadjutor bishop (Note: Under the Code of Canon Law, the coadjutor bishop has the right of succession (cum jure successionis) upon the death, retirement or resignation of the diocesan bishop he is assisting.) from 1713 to 1727. Resigned on September 12, 1733, having never visited the Diocese. Died on November 28, 1741.	
1733	1739	Pierre-Herman Dosquet, PSS	Diocesan administrator from 1729 to 1730. Coadjutor bishop from 1730 to 1733. Returned to France in October 1735. Resigned on June 25, 1739. Died on March 4, 1777.	
1739	1740	François-Louis de Pourroy de Lauberivière	Appointed on July 20, 1739. Died on August 20, 1740.	
1741	1760	Henri-Marie Dubreil de Pontbriand	Appointed on March 6, 1741. Died on June 8, 1760. Last bishop of New France before its conquest by the British.	
1766	1784	Jean-Olivier Briand	Appointed on January 21, 1766. Resigned on November 29, 1784. Died on June 25, 1794.	
1784	1788	Louis-Philippe Mariauchau d'Esgly	Coadjutor bishop from 1772 to 1784. First bishop to be born in Canada. Died on June 4, 1788.	
1788	1797	Jean-François Hubert	Coadjutor bishop from 1785 to 1788. (Note: Hubert was appointed coadjutor bishop on June 14, 1785, but only received episcopal consecration on November 29, 1786.) First bishop born in Quebec City. Resigned on September 1, 1797. Died on October 17, 1797.	
1797	1806	Pierre Denaut	Coadjutor bishop from 1794 to 1797. (Note: Denaut was appointed coadjutor bishop on September 30, 1794, but only received episcopal consecration on June 29, 1795.) Died on January 17, 1806.	
1806	1819	Joseph-Octave Plessis	Coadjutor bishop from 1800 to 1806.	

=== Archbishops of Quebec ===
Archbishops
From	Until	Incumbent	Notes	Ref(s)
1819	1825	Joseph-Octave Plessis	Became the first Archbishop of Quebec on January 12, 1819. Died on December 4, 1825.	
1825	1833	Bernard-Claude Panet	Coadjutor bishop from 1806 to 1825. (Note: Panet was appointed coadjutor archbishop on August 12, 1806, but only received episcopal consecration on April 19, 1807. His title changed to coadjutor archbishop in 1819, when Quebec was elevated to the status of archdiocese.) Died on February 14, 1833.	(Note: The Dictionary of Canadian Biography lists Panet's date of appointment as July 12, 1806, and his date of consecration as August 19, 1807. The dates used in the footnote are from the archives of the Archdiocese.)
1833	1850	Joseph Signay	Coadjutor archbishop from 1826 to 1832. (Note: Signay was appointed coadjutor archbishop on December 15, 1826, but only received episcopal consecration on May 20, 1827.) Apostolic administrator from 1832 to 1833. Died on October 3, 1850.	
1850	1867	Pierre-Flavien Turgeon	Coadjutor archbishop from 1834 to 1849. Apostolic administrator from 1849 to 1850. Died on August 25, 1867.	
1867	1870	Charles-François Baillargeon	Coadjutor archbishop from 1851 to 1855. Apostolic administrator from 1855 to 1867. Died on October 13, 1870.	
1870	1898	Elzéar-Alexandre Taschereau^{‡}	Appointed on December 24, 1870. (Note: Taschereau received episcopal consecration on March 19, 1871.) Elevated to cardinal on June 7, 1886. Died on April 12, 1898.	
1898	1925	Louis-Nazaire Bégin^{‡}	Coadjutor archbishop from 1892 to 1898. Elevated to cardinal on May 25, 1914. Died on July 18, 1925.	
1925	1926	Paul-Eugène Roy	Auxiliary bishop from 1908 to 1920. Coadjutor archbishop from 1920 to 1925. Died on February 20, 1926.	
1926	1931	Felix-Raymond-Marie Rouleau, OP^{‡}	Appointed on July 9, 1926. Elevated to cardinal on December 19, 1927. Died on May 31, 1931.	
1931	1947	Jean-Marie-Rodrigue Villeneuve, OMI^{‡}	Appointed on December 11, 1931. Elevated to cardinal on March 13, 1933. Died on January 17, 1947.	
1947	1981	Maurice Roy^{‡}	Appointed on June 2, 1947. Named the first Primate of Canada on January 24, 1956. Elevated to cardinal on February 22, 1965. Retired on March 20, 1981, after reaching the mandatory retirement age of 75. Died on October 24, 1985.	
1981	1990	Louis-Albert Vachon^{‡}	Auxiliary bishop from 1977 to 1981. Elevated to cardinal on May 25, 1985. Retired on March 17, 1990, after reaching the mandatory retirement age of 75. Died on September 29, 2006.	
1990	2002	Maurice Couture, RSV	Auxiliary bishop from 1982 to 1988. Retired on November 15, 2002, after reaching the mandatory retirement age of 75. Died on January 19, 2018.	
2003	2010	Marc Ouellet, PSS^{‡}	Appointed on November 15, 2002. (Note: Ouellet was installed on January 26, 2003.) Elevated to cardinal on October 21, 2003. Resigned in 2010 after being appointed Prefect of the Congregation for Bishops.	
2011	present	Gérald Lacroix, ISPX^{‡}	Auxiliary bishop from 2009 to 2011. Elevated to cardinal on February 22, 2014.	
