= Charles-Félix Cazeau =

French Canadian priest and administrator

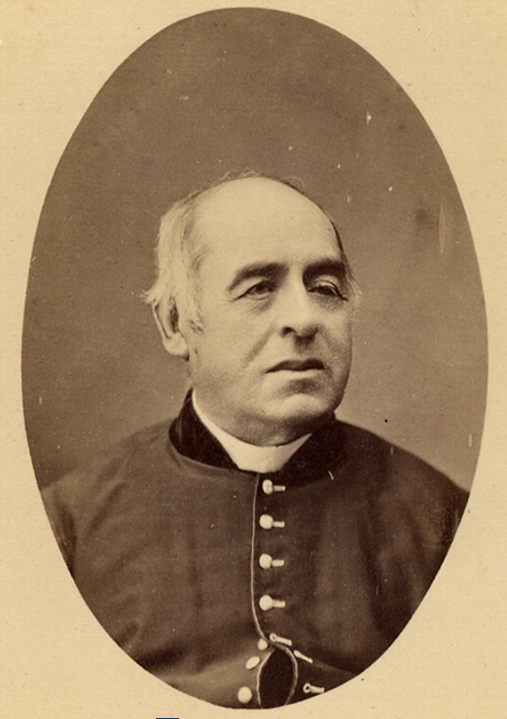
- Born: 24 December 1807; Quebec City, Lower Canada
- Died: 26 February 1881 (aged 73); Quebec City, Quebec
- Occupations: Roman Catholic priest and vicar general

Charles-Félix Cazeau (24 December 1807 – 26 February 1881) was a French Canadian priest and administrator of the Archdiocese of Quebec who was prominently involved in the relief of victims from the Great Irish Famine (1845-1849).

Cazeau began his classical education in 1819 at Quebec City. He studied at the Collège de Saint-Roch which had been recently founded by Bishop Joseph-Octave Plessis and one of his teachers was a future archbishop of the Archdiocese of Quebec, Charles-François Baillargeon.
