= Tabeau =

Tabeau is a surname. Notable people with the surname include:

- Jerzy Tabeau, Auschwitz survivor
- Pierre-Antoine Tabeau, Catholic priest
