= Pierre-Flavien Turgeon =

Canadian Roman Catholic priest

His Excellency Pierre-Flavien Turgeon
- Archbishop of Quebec
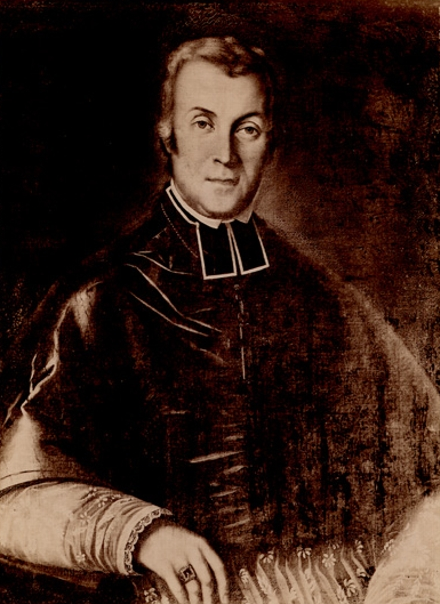
- Diocese: Quebec
- Installed: October 3, 1850
- Term ended: August 25, 1867
- Predecessor: Joseph Signay
- Successor: Charles-François Baillargeon

Orders
- Ordination: April 29, 1810

Personal details
- Born: November 12, 1787 Quebec City, Quebec
- Died: August 25, 1867 (aged 79) Quebec City, Quebec
- Coat of arms

Pierre-Flavien Turgeon (November 13, 1787, in Quebec City, Quebec – August 25, 1867, in Quebec City) was a Canadian Roman Catholic priest and Archbishop of Quebec for 17 years.

== Life ==
Pierre-Flavien Turgeon was born in Québec on November 13, 1787. He entered the Séminaire de Québec in 1799. His father, a merchant, died the following year, and his half-brother Louis served as guardian. In 1806, Joseph-Octave Plessis, Bishop of Quebec, appointed Turgeon his secretary. He was ordained in 1810.

Turgeon continued to assist Bishop Plessis in the administration of the diocese, while also fulfilling a number of different duties at the seminary. He taught philosophy from 1812 to 1815, when he became director of the Grand Seminaire. All the while, Plessis was grooming him for the episcopacy. The strain of managing both academic and diocesan responsibilities undermined his health, and in 1819, as a respite, he accompanied Plessis to Europe. Upon his return, he withdrew from teaching, but became director of the Petit Seminaire.

Plessis was succeeded by Bernard-Claude Panet in 1825, who was followed by Joseph Signay in 1833. In February 1834, Pope Gregory XVI appointed Turgeon titular bishop of Sidyme and coadjutor of Archbishop Signay. Despite fragile health, Turgeon was an excellent administrator and active coadjutor.

As auxiliary bishop, he concentrated on the areas of education and religious congregations. Of a mild disposition, he was often able to mediate disagreements between Archbishop Signay and Ignace Bourget, Bishop of Montreal. In 1844, Turgeon made a pastoral visit among the missions of the Saint Lawrence Gulf.

In November 1849, due to ill health, Signay turned over administration of the diocese to his coadjutor. Signay died in October 1850, and Turgeon succeeded as Archbishop of Quebec.

Notably collegial in his approach, Turgeon called the first provincial council of Quebec in 1851. In 1852, the suffragan dioceses of Trois-Rivières and Saint-Hyacinthe were erected. He was a moving force behind the founding of the Université Laval. Following a serious illness, in February 1855 he handed over administration of the diocese to his coadjutor, Bishop Charles-François Baillargeon. Turgeon was stricken with paralysis and often unable to speak the last seven years of his life. He died on August 25, 1867, and was buried in the cathedral.

Religious titles
Preceded by Joseph Signay	Archbishop of Quebec; 1850–1867	Succeeded by Charles-François Baillargeon
