= Marie-Clotilde Raizenne =

Canadian educator, Roman Catholic nun

Marie-Clotilde Raizenne (April 12, 1766 – August 21, 1829) was a Roman Catholic nun in the Sisters of Charity of the Hôpital Général of Montreal and an educator. She took the name Sister Marie de l’Incarnation and founded the Congregation de l’Enfant-Jésus.

The daughter of Jean-Baptiste-Jérôme Raizenne and Marie-Charlotte Sabourin, she was born at Lac-des-Deux-Montagnes and attended the mission school there. In 1785, she joined the Grey Nuns at the Hôpital Général of Montreal. She was named sacristan and later treasurer, and in 1811 was placed in charge of the men's wing. In 1821, Raizenne was named assistant to the superior. In 1821, Bishop Alexander Macdonell invited the Grey Nuns to establish a school for girls in Upper Canada. Although the nuns refused this offer, Raizenne was interested and, in 1828, was released from the Grey Nuns by Bishop Bernard-Claude Panet. Because she was French-speaking, she decided to establish the school in Sandwich (later Windsor) in the Western District. By July 1929, the school had been established with 50 students and several candidates for the new order had been identified.

However, Raizenne died in Sandwich a few weeks later and the order's novices went elsewhere so, in the end, she was the first and only member of the congregation.

Her aunt Marie Raizenne was a superior in the Congregation of Notre Dame of Montreal.
