= Charles-François Bailly de Messein =

- Coadjutor Bishop of Quebec
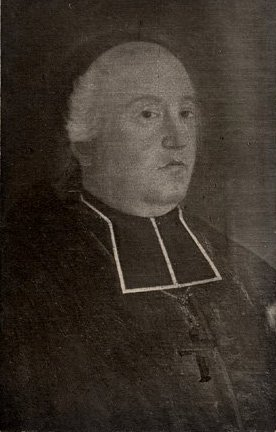
- See: Quebec
- Installed: September 26, 1788
- Term ended: May 20, 1794
- Predecessor: Jean-François Hubert
- Successor: Pierre Denaut

Orders
- Ordination: March 20, 1767

Personal details
- Born: November 4, 1740 Varennes, near Montreal, Canada, New France
- Died: May 20, 1794 (aged 53) Quebec City, Lower Canada

Charles François Bailly de Messein (4 November 1740 – 20 May 1794) was a priest active in the British province of Quebec during the American Revolutionary War. He is best known for his Loyalist activism during the American invasion of Quebec, when he was injured during the Battle of Saint-Pierre, and for publicly supporting a planned university that his bishop opposed.

== Early career ==
Charles François Bailly de Messein was born in Varennes on November 11, 1740. His parents sent him to study at the College Louis-le-Grand in Paris. He was ordained to the priesthood at the Quebec Seminary on March 10, 1767. He was sent as a missionary to Nova Scotia from 1767 to 1771.

On his return to Quebec in 1772, Bailly became professor of rhetoric at the Quebec Seminary, a post he held for four years. He was admitted as a member of the board of directors of the seminary in December 1774, the same year he wrote his paper Rhetorica in Seminario Quebecensi.

== American invasion ==
During American invasion of Quebec, Bailly travelled in the spring 1776 to the southern coast of the Saint Lawrence River, preaching fidelity to England to his compatriots. Wounded in the abdomen, he convalesced at the seminary, and then became parish priest in Point-aux-Trembles (now Neuville), near Quebec City, in September 1777. In 1778, Bailly became a tutor to the children of Guy Carleton, the governor of the province, and accompanied the family on a voyage to London. In June 1786, Carleton was elevated to the peerage as Baron Dorchester and succeeded in imposing Bailly's candidature as coadjutor to the bishop of Quebec. The bishop, Monseigneur Jean-François Hubert, did not agree with the governor's choice. Bailly had a letter published in the Quebec Gazette on April 29, 1790 openly criticizing his superior.

In October of the same year, he published a report in favour of the foundation of a secular, coeducational university. Bishop Hubert had already publicly expressed his opposition to such a project, but Bailly responded with eloquence, saying "I believe Monseigneur Hubert is convinced of his inadequacy and of his too great sufficiency." From then on all communications between the two men ceased. Bailly's presence at the seminary became extremely rare and even the governor repudiated him. In April 1794, with his health failing, he was brought by launch to the Hôpital Général de Québec where he died on May 20, 1794.
