= Charles-François Baillargeon =

Canadian Roman Catholic priest and archbishop

His Excellency Charles-François Baillargeon
- Archbishop of Quebec
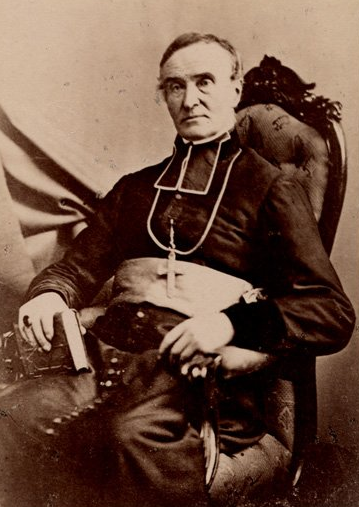
- See: Quebec
- Installed: August 25, 1867
- Term ended: October 13, 1870
- Predecessor: Pierre-Flavien Turgeon
- Successor: Elzéar-Alexandre Taschereau

Orders
- Ordination: June 1, 1822

Personal details
- Born: April 26, 1798 Île aux Grues, Lower Canada
- Died: October 13, 1870 (aged 72) Quebec City, Quebec
- Coat of arms

Charles-François Baillargeon (French pronunciation: [ʃaʁl fʁɑ̃swa bajaʁʒɔ̃]; April 26, 1798 – October 13, 1870) was a Canadian Roman Catholic priest and archbishop.

== Biography ==
He was from Lower Canada and studied at the Collège de Saint-Pierre-de-la-Rivière-du-Sud and Collège de Nicolet followed by four years of theology at Quebec where his choice of the priesthood was confirmed. He was ordained in 1822 and became chaplain of the church of Saint-Roch and also the director of the college.

He then served as a parish priest and in 1831 was appointed by Bishop Bernard-Claude Panet to the cathedral as a parish priest. This was an extremely taxing assignment, and he was also working on a French translation of the New Testament for Bishop Joseph-Octave Plessis.

He became Bishop Baillargeon in 1851 and archbishop in 1867. He continued to be active in his vocation until his death. Because he had not appointed a coadjutor, two priests, Charles-Félix Cazeau and Elzéar-Alexandre Taschereau, served as administrators for a period.

== See also ==
- Roman Catholic Archdiocese of Quebec
