= Henri-Marie =

Henri-Marie is a masculine given name. Notable people with the name include:

- Henri-Marie Dondra, Central African Republic politician
- Henri-Marie Dubreil de Pontbriand, Canadian Catholic prelate
