= Joseph-Laurent Bertrand =

Joseph-Laurent Bertrand (November 6, 1741 – October 29, 1813) was a Roman Catholic priest from Lower Canada. He was born at Montreal and died at Rivière-du-Loup.

Bertrand came to the priesthood after his wife died and having no children, felt the need for a new vocation. He was ordained by Bishop Jean-Olivier Briand at the age of 34. In his first parish, the church was destroyed by fire and in the resulting turmoil over re-building, he became unhappy with the situation and asked for a transfer.

In 1786, he was assigned to the parish at Rivière-du-Loup by Bishop Louis-Philippe Mariauchau d’Esgly. He appears to have been rather authoritarian and drew more attention than was normal for a parish priest. His importance to history revolves around the construction of another church and more specifically the land on which it was to be built. Father Bertrand sued the man who was to provide land for the church of a new parish and disputed the Church's authority to create said parish and require land for a church. There was a protracted legal battle which was eventually produced a ruling against the Church.

The lawsuit had raised questions about the Roman Catholic Church and its legal status after the conquest. Although the ruling did not explicitly state the fact, it set precedent for the future in creating parishes in Quebec. Joseph-Laurent Bertrand had lost a case but his tenacity in pursuing the best interests of his parishes made him a respected community and religious leader.
