= Jean-Jacques Lartigue =

Canadian Sulpician

His Excellency, the Right Reverend Jean-Jacques Lartigue S.S.
- Bishop of Montréal
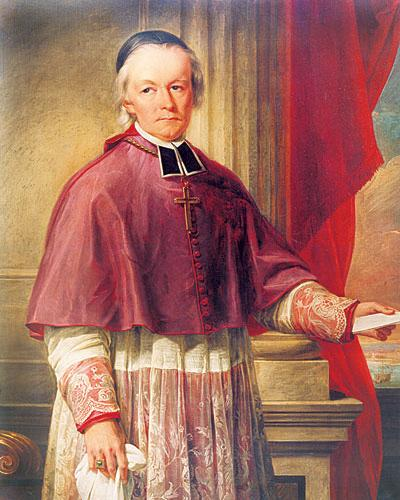
- Diocese: Montréal
- Installed: 13 May 1836
- Term ended: 19 April 1840
- Successor: Bishop Ignace Bourget

Orders
- Ordination: 21 September 1800
- Consecration: 21 January 1821 by Archbishop Joseph-Octave Plessis

Personal details
- Born: 20 June 1777 Montreal, Province of Quebec, Kingdom of Great Britain
- Died: 19 April 1840 (aged 62) Montreal, Lower Canada, United Kingdom
- Buried: Mary, Queen of the World Cathedral; Montreal, Quebec, Canada
- Denomination: Roman Catholic
- Parents: Jacques Larthigue & Marie-Charlotte Cherrier
- Education: Grand séminaire de Montréal

Jean-Jacques Lartigue, S.S., (20 June 1777 – 19 April 1840) was a Canadian Sulpician, who served as the first Catholic Bishop of Montreal.

== Early life ==
Lartigue was born to a noted Montreal family, the only son of Jacques Larthigue, a surgeon, and Marie-Charlotte Cherrier. He attended the Collège Saint-Raphaël (later the Petit Séminaire de Montréal), followed by two years at an English school run by the Sulpicians, receiving a solid education. He then clerked for three years with a Montreal law firm where he developed a lifelong interest in the politics of Lower Canada. In this he followed the example of his three uncles who were members of the Canadian legislature, including Joseph Papineau and Denis Viger.

In 1797, Lartigue gave up a promising career in the legal profession and turned toward the Catholic priesthood. He soon received minor orders and later the diaconate from Bishop Pierre Denaut of Quebec and taught at his Saint-Raphaël, while he studied for the priesthood under the Sulpicians. He was ordained a deacon on 28 October 1799, and Bishop Denaut appointed him as his secretary.

== Priesthood ==
On 21 September 1800, Lartigue was ordained a priest by Bishop Denaut at the Church of Saint-Denis on the banks of the Richelieu River, where another uncle, François Cherrier, was curé. Lartigue helped not only in the administrative affairs of the diocese, but in the pastoral duties at Longueuil, where the bishop resided as curé. Despite his poor health, he accompanied the bishop on pastoral visits; in 1803 to the Maritimes, part of the diocese, where no bishop had visited since the late 17th century.

Denault's death in 1806 gave Lartigue the freedom to become a member of the Society of Saint-Sulpice, into which he was received in February of that year, seeking a more contemplative and intellectual life. He joined the Sulpician community of the Seminary, the first native Canadian to enter the Society. He was assigned to help in the Parish of Notre-Dame which was attached to the Seminary. That same year, Denault's successor, Joseph-Octave Plessis, called upon his legal knowledge to challenge an effort by Attorney General Jonathan Sewell to challenge the legal standing of Catholic parishes created since the British conquest of New France.

In 1819 the Seminary faced a legal challenge from the British governor of the province to its holding of various seigneuries in Quebec, which were its primary means of support. Lartigue was entrusted with the superior of the Seminary with a mission to London to present their case directly to the government in England. The superior chose Lartigue as being particularly qualified for the mission because of his knowledge of the law and his mastery of English. For this he was to accompany Bishop Plessis, who was traveling there to secure letters patent for the establishment of a new seminary and for permission to divide the Diocese of Quebec, which was proving unmanageable. They sailed for London on 3 July 1819 on the George Symes, arriving on 14 August.

Lartigue spent the following two months meeting with various officials of the British government, even the Vicar Apostolic in London, who was the chief authority for the Catholic Church in the United Kingdom. He seemed to be making no progress in his cause, so in late October he traveled to Paris where he spent a month trying to find some way of securing the support of the French government to intercede for them. He returned to Canada, believing his mission a failure. Nothing, however, came of the Canadian governor's efforts to seize the Seminary's holdings.

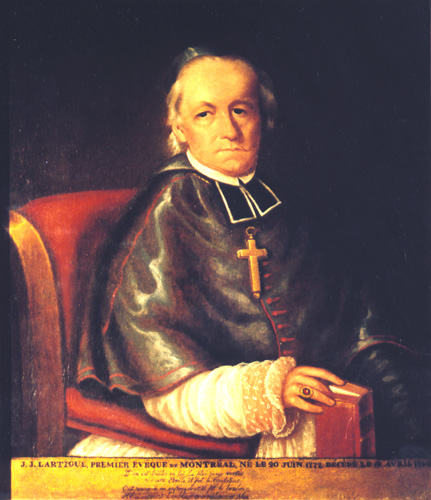
1840 painting of Lartigue by Yves Tessier

== Bishop ==
Plessis failed to obtain the permission of the Crown to divide his diocese. A compromise was struck, though, by which he would be allowed to be given four auxiliary bishops to help govern the far-flung diocese. He already had Lartigue in mind for one of these positions. Becoming aware of this, Lartigue was reluctant to accept, which would have meant leaving the life of the Sulpician community. The Superior General of the Society in Paris left the decision to the Superior of the Seminary, who eventually granted Plessis' request.

In February 1820 Lartigue was named an auxiliary bishop of the Diocese of Quebec and appointed vicar general for Montreal, for which position he was consecrated as a bishop on 21 January 1821 in the Church of Notre-Dame. He was given the major responsibility for administering the various and many Catholic institutions of the city and region.

The Sulpicians were at first pleased with his appointment, until they realized that he was still under the authority of the Bishop of Quebec. Lartigue found himself at odds with his former Sulpician colleagues. Even apart from the division over the role of the papacy, the Superior of the Seminary apparently feared the loss of power by their community to a prelate of the Church, even one who had been one of their own. He was even refused hospitality at the Seminary. They began to be concerned that the hierarchy in Quebec was seeking to undermine Sulpician influence in Montreal. Notre-Dame was a Sulpician parish. In June 1821, while Lartigue was away visiting rural parishes, the warders removed his episcopal chair from the church. Upon his return, Lartigue was forced to relocate to the chapel of the Hotel-Dieu.

His cousin, Denis-Benjamin Viger donated land for a church. The cornerstone of Saint-Jacques Cathedral was laid in May 1823. Lartigue placed his secretary Ignace Bourget in charge of the building project. Bishop Plessis consecrated the cathedral in September 1825.

One of his first actions was to establish a major seminary in the new bishop's palace, called the Séminaire Saint-Jacques, which he established in 1825. He placed a trusted associate, Ignace Bourget, in charge of the new facility. Its goal was to provide a well-trained clergy for the diocese. Lartigue and Bourget shared a strong belief in that supreme authority of the papacy in the life of the Catholic Church. Lartigue had been influenced in this by the writings of the French Abbé Hugues Felicité Robert de Lamennais, whose Essai sur l’indifférence en matière de religion (Paris, 1817) he had read at the time of his trip to Europe. Thus the school became a center of ultramontanism decades before this position was proclaimed an essential element of Catholic belief at the First Vatican Council. In this, he came into conflict with his own Sulpician community, as well as various sectors of the Catholic population. He was shaken by the condemnation of Pope Gregory XVI of Lamennais' teachings in the 1830s.

Lartigue also focused on the primary education of the young, which he felt to be a responsibility of the Church, rather than the state. In 1824, the Canadian government had passed legislation authorizing fabrique schools. He urged the pastors to take advantage of this law and to set up schools as part of their parishes. In this way, he hoped to form the mind of the next generation in a stronger commitment to the Catholic faith. He set up a school for this purpose, also in his official residence. Within a year, it was educating some 80 children. He founded a second school at a separate location.

The Catholic Church in Quebec had long felt that it was the victim of the hostility of the British government. This was typified by London's refusal to allow the Diocese of Quebec to be divided. Pope Gregory took matters into hand himself, issued a papal bull on 13 May 1836, establishing Montreal as an independent diocese. Faced with this, the British authorities acquiesced.

During the Lower Canada Rebellion of 1837, Bishop Lartigue cautioned the faithful of his diocese against any revolutionary action. For two days, more than twelve hundred "Patriotes" marched in front of Saint-Jacques cathedral to protest the Bishop's directive. The Bishop was not intimidated. He forbade the burial in consecrated ground of patriots killed during the rebellions. Lartigue recognized that the Patriotes were outnumbered and under-equipped. The moderate Patriotes of the Quebec took note of Lartigue's warning against an unequal conflict.

== Death ==
Latirgue served as bishop until his death in 1840, at which point he was succeeded by his associate, Ignace Bourget. He is buried in the crypt of the Cathédrale Marie-Reine-du-Monde.

== See also ==
- Thomas Maguire
