= Joseph Signay =

Canadian Catholic archbishop (1778–1850)

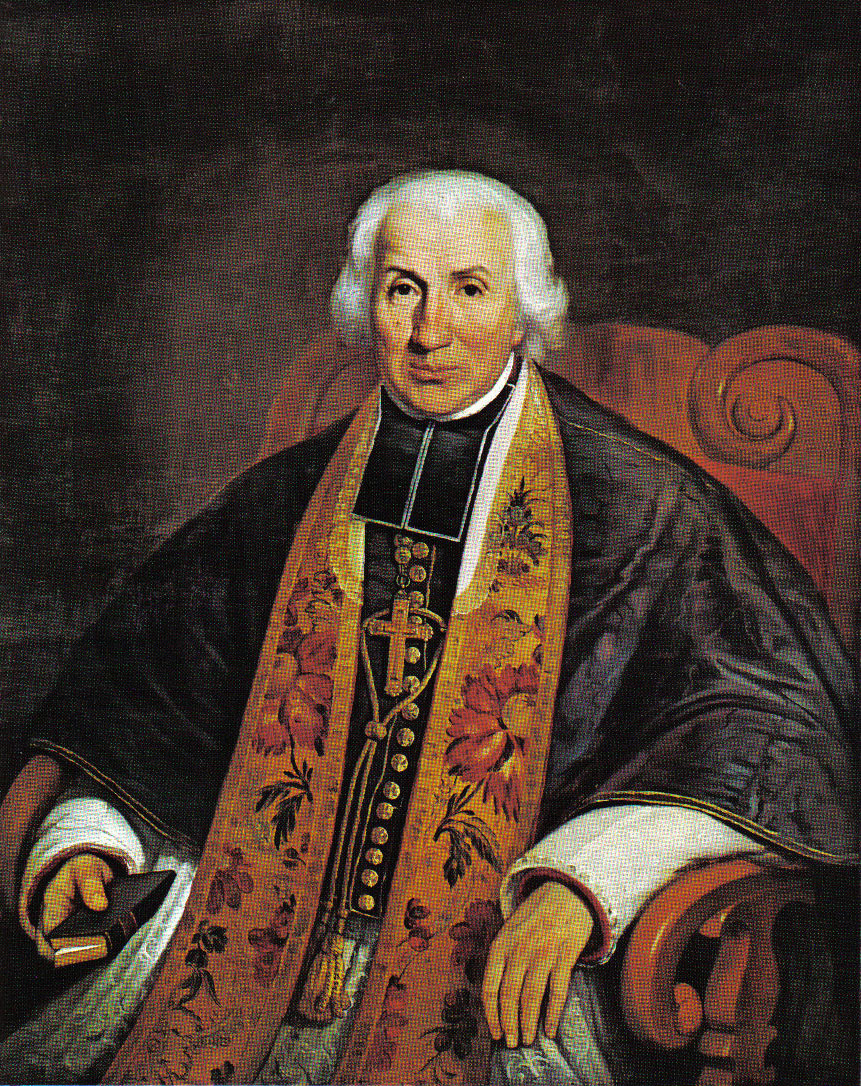
Joseph Signay by Théophile Hamel

Joseph Signay (8 November 1778 – 3 October 1850) was the third archbishop of the Roman Catholic Archdiocese of Quebec.

Signay was ordained in 1802 by Bishop Pierre Denaut and began a number of years of parish duties. In 1814, he was appointed parish priest of Quebec by Archbishop Joseph-Octave Plessis. In 1825, Bernard-Claude Panet became archbishop and selected Signay as his coadjutor.

Signay became archbishop in 1833 and he was followed by Pierre-Flavien Turgeon in 1850.

Religious titles
| Preceded by Bernard-Claude Panet | Archbishop of Quebec; 1833–1850 | Succeeded by Pierre-Flavien Turgeon |
