= Véronique Brunet =

Véronique Brunet dit L’Estang (January 13, 1726 – June 12, 1810) was a Roman Catholic nun in the Congregation of Notre Dame of Montreal. She took the name Sister Sainte-Rose and served as superior general. She signed her name Verronique Létant.

The daughter of Jean Brunet dit L’Estang, and Marguerite Dubois, she was born in Pointe-Claire. In 2744, she became a novice in the Congregation of Notre-Dame in Montreal and, in 1746, took her vows as a nun. She served at the missions in the Lower Town of Quebec City, at Pointe-aux-Trembles and at Sainte-Famille on Île d’Orléans. In 1771, she returned to Montreal to serve as assistant to the superior Marie-Josèphe Maugue-Garreau. In 1772 she became superior. In 1778, she was succeeded by Marie Raizenne as superior; Brunet served as mistress of novices until 1784 when she served a second term as superior. In 1790, she became assistant mistress of novices; she also gave religious instruction to girls from Montreal who were not able to attend full-time classes. Later, she washed and mended the clothes of servant girls employed by the community.

Brunet died in Montreal at the age of 84.
