= Marie Raizenne =

Marie Raizenne (July 14, 1735 – April 20, 1811) was a Roman Catholic nun in the Congregation of Notre Dame of Montreal. She took the name Sister Saint-Ignace and served as superior general.

The daughter of Josiah Rising, also known as Shoentakwanni and Ignace Raizenne, and Abigail Nims, also known as Towatogowash, she was born at the mission of Lac-des-Deux-Montagnes. Her parents had both been born in New England but were captured and brought to New France, where they were baptized as Catholics; her older sister had also become a nun and her brother became a priest. In 1761, she helped restore the Sainte-Famille mission on Île d’Orléans. She was sent to the Lower Town of Quebec City to take charge of the mission there in 1769. She was recalled to Montreal in 1775 as assistant to superior Véronique Brunet; in 1778, she became superior herself. In 1784, she became mistress of novices and, in 1790, was re-elected superior. She served again as mistress of novices from 1796 to 1802. At this point, she retired and died in Montreal nine years later.

Her niece Marie-Clotilde Raizenne founded a new order, the Congregation de l’Enfant-Jésus.
