= Jean-Baptiste-Antoine Ferland =

French Canadian historian

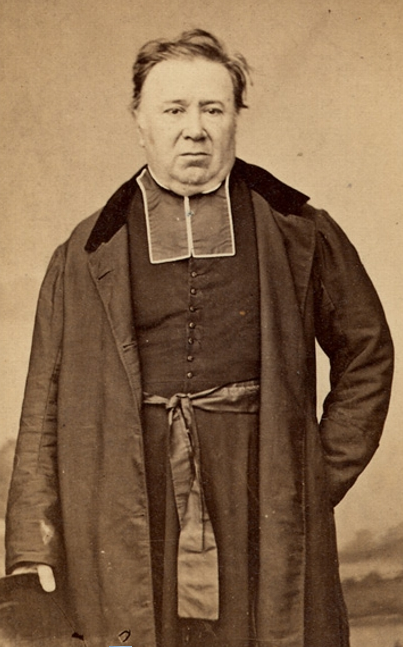
- Born: 25 December 1805; Montreal, Lower Canada
- Died: 11 January 1865 (aged 59); Quebec City, Canada East

Jean-Baptiste-Antoine Ferland (25 December 1805 in Montreal – 11 January 1865 in Quebec City) was a French Canadian historian.

== Life ==
He studied at the college of Nicolet and was ordained 1828. He ministered to country parishes until 1841, when he was made director of studies in the college of Nicolet. He became its superior in 1848. Being named a member of the council of the Bishop of Quebec, he took up his residence in that city, where he was also chaplain to the English garrison. From his college days he had devoted himself to the study of Canadian history; the numerous notes which he collected had made him one of the most learned men of the country. It was not, however, until he had reached the age of forty that he thought of writing a history of Canada. In 1853, he published his Observations sur l' histoire ecclésiastique du Canada, a refutation and criticism of the work of the Abbé Brasseur de Bourburg; it was reprinted in France in 1854. In the latter year he published Notes sur les régistres de Notre Dame de Québec, a second edition of which, revised and augmented appeared in the Foyer Canadien for 1863. In 1855 he was appointed professor of Canadian history at the Université Laval (Sainte-Foy, Quebec), and went at once to France to collect new documents to perfect him in his work. He returned in 1857, bringing with him valuable notes. The public courses which he delivered from 1858 to 1862 attracted large audiences.

== Works ==
His lectures, printed as Cours d' Histoire du Canada, established Ferland's reputation. The first volume appeared in 1861; the second was not published until after the author's death in 1865. This work, written in a style at once simple and exact, is considered authoritative by competent judges. It is, however, incomplete, ending as it does with the conquest of Canada by the English (1759). Ferland aimed above all at establishing the facts of history. He desired also to make known the work of the Catholic missions.

Ferland also published in the Soirées Canadiennes of 1863 the Journal d'un voyage sur les côtes de la Gaspésie, and in Littérature Canadienne for 1863 an Etude sur le Labrador, which had previously appeared in the Annales de l'Association pour la Propagation de la Foi. For the Foyer Canadien of 1863 he wrote a Vie de Mgr Plessis, Bishop of Quebec, translated later into English.
