= Louis-Philippe Mariauchau d'Esgly =

Canadian bishop

Louis-Philippe Mariauchau d’Esgly
- Bishop of Quebec
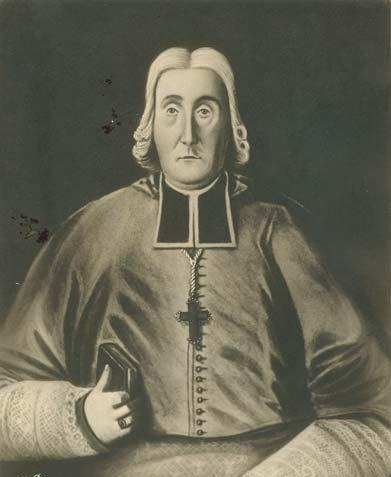
- Louis Philippe Mariauchau d Esgly
- Diocese: Quebec
- Installed: 1784
- Term ended: 1788
- Predecessor: Jean-Olivier Briand
- Successor: Jean-François Hubert
- Other post: coadjutor

Orders
- Ordination: 1734

Personal details
- Born: April 24, 1710
- Died: June 4, 1788 (aged 78) Saint-Pierre-d'Orléans, Quebec
- Buried: Notre-Dame Basilica, Quebec
- Denomination: Roman Catholic
- Residence: Saint-Pierre-d'Orléans, Quebec

Louis-Philippe Mariauchau d’Esgly (24 April 1710 – 4 June 1788) was the eighth bishop of the Roman Catholic Archdiocese of Quebec.

== Life ==
Louis-Philippe Mariauchau d’Esgly was born 24 April 1710, the second son of Captain Francois Mariauchau d'Esgly (1670-1730), of the Dauphin's Regiment and the Governor-General's Guards; King's Lieutenant at Trois-Rivières. His mother, Louise-Philippe Chartier de Lotbinière (1690-1725), was the daughter of René-Louis Chartier de Lotbinière. He was godson of his mother's first cousin, Pierre de Rigaud, Marquis de Vaudreuil-Cavagnial, and he himself was a first cousin of Michel Chartier de Lotbinière, Marquis de Lotbinière.

After completing his studies at the Séminaire de Québec, he was ordained priest in 1734 and appointed pastor of Saint-Pierre-d'Orléans, which also included duties at Saint-Laurent in L'Arbre-Sec. After thirty-five years of ministry, he was called to the episcopate and consecrated coadjutor of Quebec, 12 July 1772, the first native of Canada to become a bishop in the Catholic Church. The Lotbinière family had lobbied the governor, and the bishop, Jean-Olivier Briand, thought it best to agree even though his proposed successor was older than he and deaf. While accepting the position, Esgly chose to remain parish priest at St. Pierre. In 1775 he made a pastoral visit to the other parishes on the Île d'Orléans.

On the resignation of Briand, Esgly succeeded to the See of Quebec 29 November 1784, but continued to serve as pastor at St. Pierre. One of his first acts was to appoint his vicars general for the vast diocese. He confirmed Henri-François Gravé de La Rive at Quebec, Pierre Garreau at Trois-Rivières, and Étienne Montgolfier at Montreal, while he oversaw things from Saint-Pierre-d'Orléans.

In Esgly's first pastoral letter he alludes to the appointment of a coadjutor, a precaution justified by age, infirmity, and the necessity of securing a successor. Jean-François Hubert, who was a missioner at Notre-Dame-de l’Assomption near Detroit at the time, was nominated coadjutor that same year, but the approval of the British Government was withheld till 1786.

The main question that concerned Esglis was the lack of priests. He tried unsuccessfully to supply the dearth of clergy by obtaining priests from France. The British Government preferred the emigration of priests for the settlements in Upper Canada and the Maritime Provinces. Pending the arrival of a missionary for the Acadians, a layman was authorized to baptize and witness marriage contracts. Acadians settled in the maritime provinces and confirmed Joseph-Mathurin Bourg as Vicar-General for that area. The priests Girouard, Le Roux, and Donat, of the congregation of the Holy Ghost served there, while the Irish and Scotch Catholics of the same region were attended by the Abbé Phelan and Capuchin James Jones, who resided at Halifax. John Butler, bishop of Cork, sent some priests, recruited by the Irish priest Thomas Hussey, representative of the Diocese of Quebec in London. In 1787, Esglis issued a pastoral letter to all the faithful of the lower provinces, exhorting them to union and steadfastness in the Catholic faith.

Esglis died 4 June 1788 in the fifty-fifth year of his priesthood and was buried at Saint-Pierre. In 1969, his remains were transferred to the crypt of the basilica of Notre-Dame in Quebec.

== See also ==
- Joseph-Laurent Bertrand

== Sources ==
- Pelletier, Jean-Guy (1979). "MARIAUCHAU D'ESGLY (d'Esglis, Desglis, Desgly), LOUIS-PHILIPPE". In Halpenny, Francess G. (ed.). Dictionary of Canadian Biography. Vol. IV (1771–1800) (online ed.). University of Toronto Press.

Religious titles
Preceded by Jean-Olivier Briand	Bishop of Quebec; 1784–1788	Succeeded by Jean-François Hubert
