= Jean-Marie-Rodrigue Villeneuve =

Canadian Cardinal

His Eminence Jean-Marie-Rodrigue Villeneuve OMI
- Cardinal, Archbishop of Quebec
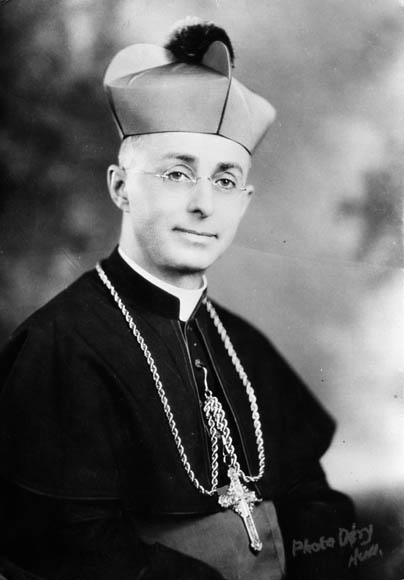
- Archdiocese: Quebec
- In office: December 11, 1931 - January 17, 1947
- Predecessor: Felix-Raymond-Marie Rouleau
- Successor: Maurice Roy
- Other post: Bishop of Gravelbourg

Orders
- Ordination: 25 May 1907 by Joseph-Thomas Duhamel
- Consecration: 11 September 1930 by Joseph-Guillaume Forbes
- Created cardinal: 13 March 1933 by Pius XI
- Rank: Cardinal-Priest

Personal details
- Born: November 2, 1883 Montreal, Quebec, Canada
- Died: January 17, 1947 (aged 63) Alhambra, California, United States
- Coat of arms: Jean-Marie-Rodrigue Villeneuve's coat of arms

Styles of Jean-Marie-Rodrigue Villeneuve
- Reference style: His Eminence
- Spoken style: Your Eminence
- Informal style: Cardinal
- See: Quebec

Ordination history of Jean-Marie-Rodrigue Villeneuve
History
Episcopal consecration
- Consecrated by: Joseph-Thomas Duhamel
- Date: September 11, 1930
Episcopal succession
Bishops consecrated by Jean-Marie-Rodrigue Villeneuve as principal consecrator
- Joseph Bonhomme (titular Tulana, VA Basutoland): June 28, 1933
- François-Xavier Lacroisière (titular Vulturia, VA Ruwenzori): July 25, 1934
- Jean-Louis-Antoine-Joseph Coudert (titular Rhodiopolis, Coadjutor VA Yukon-Prince Rupert): June 7, 1936
- Albini Lafortune (Nicolet): July 25, 1938
- Anthony Jordan (titular Vada, VA Prince Rupert): September 8, 1945
- Maurice Roy (Trois-Rivières): May 1, 1946

Jean-Marie-Rodrigue Villeneuve OMI (November 2, 1883 – January 17, 1947) was a Canadian cardinal of the Roman Catholic Church. He served as Archbishop of Quebec from 1931 until his death, and was elevated to the cardinalate in 1933.

== Biography ==
=== Early life and ordination ===
Jean-Marie-Rodrigue Villeneuve was born in Montreal, one of the three children of Rodrigue Villeneuve (a shoemaker) and Louise Lalonde. He completed his secondary studies at Mont-Saint-Louis, from where he obtained a diploma in science and commerce, in 1900. After teaching at a school in Dorval, Villeneuve entered the Oblates of Mary Immaculate on August 14, 1901, in Lachine. He professed his final vows on September 8, 1903, and was ordained to the priesthood by Archbishop Joseph-Thomas Duhamel on May 25, 1907. While pursuing doctoral studies at the University of Ottawa, Villeneuve taught philosophy (1907–1913) and moral theology (1913–1920) at the Oblate Scholasticate in Ottawa. He also served as a professor of canon law, liturgy, spirituality, and ecclesiastical history, and the Dean of Theology at the Scholasticate.

=== Professor ===
From the University of Ottawa, he earned a doctorate in philosophy (1919), doctorate in theology (1922), and doctorate in canon law (1930). Villeneuve founded the School of Superior Ecclesiastical Studies, where he was made titular professor of canon law, in 1928. In 1929, he returned to the University of Ottawa, this time to head the Canon Law Faculty. He was active in labor unions, civil rights, and contributed to Le Droit.

=== Bishop and Archbishop ===
On July 3, 1930, Villeneuve was appointed the first Bishop of Gravelbourg by Pope Pius XI. He received his episcopal consecration on the following September 11 from Archbishop Joseph-Guillaume-Laurent Forbes, with Bishops Louis Rhéaume, OMI, and Joseph Guy, OMI, serving as co-consecrators, in the Cathedral of Ottawa. Villeneuve was later named Archbishop of Quebec on December 11, 1931.

=== Cardinal ===
Pius XI created him Cardinal-Priest of S. Maria degli Angeli in the consistory of March 13, 1933. Commenting on his elevation, Villeneuve said, "I do not feel at all worthy, but the Sovereign Pontiff calls me and I go." The Canadian primate was one of the cardinal electors who participated in the 1939 papal conclave, at which he himself was considered papabile, that selected Pope Pius XII.

=== Later life and death ===
Villeneuve was stricken by a heart attack on July 7, 1946, while returning from Île-à-la-Crosse, where he had taken part in the celebrations for the centennial of his order. After being hospitalized at Hôtel-Dieu de Québec, he left Quebec for the United States, specifically for Misericordia Hospital in Manhattan, on the following October 4 for medical treatment, having yet another crisis on October 14.

Seeking a milder climate, he arrived at a convent in Alhambra, California, on January 14, 1947. Three days later, the Cardinal stopped his private secretary during the beginning of the latter's Mass, sensing his death was imminent. He died within the hour, at 7:50 a.m., aged 63.

Upon his body's return to Canada, flags were set at half-mast. On January 24, Cardinal James Charles McGuigan celebrated his funeral Mass, at which, according to Villeneuve's will, there was no eulogy but only Gregorian music. He is buried in the Cathedral-Basilica of Quebec.

== Views ==
=== Modern freedoms ===
He was opposed to freedom of the press, of thought, and of religion, and opposed women's suffrage, which passed in Quebec in 1940, as causing ruinous effects on family unity and the authority of the father.

=== Wearing shorts ===
He viewed wearing shorts as an offence to Christian decency. He became known in Quebec as its "Good Father."

=== Conscription ===
Initially for neutrality, he encouraged French Canadians to register for the draft and to enlist upon the outbreak of the Second World War: "You cannot fight this war by condensing the horizon to this continent." Most Quebec nationalists opposed the war, and some even viewed Hitler as an ally against communism.

During the autumn of 1944, he visited the Canadian military that were stationed in Great Britain, Italy, Belgium, and the Netherlands.

Catholic Church titles
New diocese	Bishop of Gravelbourg; 1930–1931	Succeeded by Louis-Joseph-Arthur Melanson
Preceded by Felix-Raymond-Marie Rouleau	Archbishop of Quebec; 1931–1947	Succeeded by Maurice Roy
