= Louis-François Duplessis de Mornay =

French bishop

- Bishop of Quebec
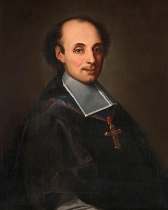
- Diocese: Quebec
- Installed: 1727
- Term ended: 1733
- Predecessor: Jean-Baptiste de La Croix de Chevrières de Saint-Vallier
- Successor: Pierre-Herman Dosquet

Personal details
- Born: September 20, 1663 Vannes, France
- Died: November 28, 1741 (aged 78) Paris, France
- Denomination: Roman Catholic

Louis-François Duplessis de Mornay (September 20, 1663 – November 28, 1741) was bishop of the diocese of Quebec from 1727 to 1733, although he never went to Canada. From a noble family, he joined the Capuchins. Appointed Vicar-General for Louisiana, he supervised the various orders conducting missions through correspondence.

== Life ==
Louis-François Duplessis de Mornay was born to a family of high nobility on September 20, 1663, at Vannes in Bretagne. He became a Capuchin and was later Guardian of the Capuchin Friary at Meudon.

== Vicar-General of Louisiana ==
From the beginning of French involvement in the area, Louisiana had been placed under the bishop of Quebec. In August, 1717, the Duc d'Orléans, as Regent of France, issued letters patent establishing a joint-stock company to be called "The Company of the West", to which Louisiana was transferred. The company applied to the bishop of Quebec for priests, and on 16 May 1722, Louisiana was divided into three vicariates. The district north of the Ohio was entrusted to the Society of Jesus and the Priests of the Foreign Missions of Paris and Quebec; that between the Mississippi and the Rio Perdito, to the Discalced Carmelite Fathers with headquarters at Mobile. The Carmelites were recalled, not long after, and their district was given to the Capuchins. A different arrangement was made for the Indian and new French settlements on the lower Mississippi. With the Capuchins of New Orleans reporting directly to a Capuchin bishop in Paris (Mornay), this meant that the Church in Louisiana had a good deal of autonomy, "...separate from Quebec for all practical purposes -as the Capuchins expanded into Mobile and other nearby settlements."

Because of the remoteness of this district from Quebec, in 1713 Mornay was appointed, at the request of Jean-Baptiste de Saint-Vallier, Bishop of Quebec, his coadjutor. On 22 April 1714 Mornay was consecrated titular bishop of Eumenia. Bishop Saint-Vallier appointed him vicar-general for Louisiana. Bishop Saint-Vallier wrote asking him to go to Louisiana. The King tried to impress upon him the importance of his presence in Quebec. But nothing could prevail on him to cross the ocean. Mornay did what he could through correspondence.

When the Company of the West applied to him for priests for the lower Mississippi Valley he offered the more populous field of colonists to the Capuchin Fathers of the province of Champaigne, who, however, did not take any immediate steps, and it was not until 1720 that any of the order came to Louisiana. In 1721 New Orleans, named after the Duc d'Orléans, was described by Father Roulleaux de la Vente as "a little village of about one hundred cabins dotted here and there, a large wooden warehouse in which I said Mass, a chapel in course of construction and two storehouses". In 1722 Bishop Mornay entrusted the spiritual jurisdiction of the Indians to the Jesuits, who were to establish missions in all parts of Louisiana with residence at New Orleans, but were not to exercise any ecclesiastical function there without the consent of the Capuchins, though they were to minister to the French in the Illinois District, with the Priests of the Foreign Missions, where the superior of each body was a vicar-general, just as the Capuchin superior was at New Orleans.

== Bishop of Quebec ==
Bishop Saint-Vallier died on December 26, 1727, at the Hôpital-Général de Québec which he had founded in 1692. In March 1728, before news of Saint-Vallier's death reached Paris, Morney resigned as coadjutor. His resignation was accepted and Abbé Machuco de Presnaux was named in his place. However, as Mornay was named coadjutor with right of succession, He became, de facto, Bishop of Quebec immediately upon Saint-Vallier's death, thus, rendering both the later resignation and appointment null and void.

Fearing any confusion a resignation might inspire, Mornay wrote to Archdeacon Louis-Eustache Chartier de Lotbiniere asking him to take possession of the see in his name. However, a dispute had arisen between Lotbiniere and the canons over who should preside over Saint-Valleir's funeral. It became a long and bitter dispute over precedence, with the canons refusing to acknowledge Lotbiniere's authority and Canon Boullard placing the Hôpital-Général under interdict and removing the mother superior from office. The civil authorities attempted to arbitrate the matter. When the King was informed, he restored order. And still, Mornay declined to proceed to his see.

In May 1729, Pierre-Herman Dosquet was appointed administrator of the diocese; the following year Dosquet was appointed coadjutor. Faced with the responsibility but not the revenues attached to the bishopric of Quebec, in 1732 Dosquet he returned to France to either get Mornay to come to Quebec or resign. Mornay was then about seventy years old. Dosquet persuaded the King's minister to write Mornay a severe letter, whereupon Mornay tendered his resignation. Dosquet became Bishop of Quebec.

Mornay died in Paris, where he lived since 1713 on November 28, 1741.
