= Thomas Maguire (priest) =

American-born Canadian Roman Catholic priest, vicar general and educator

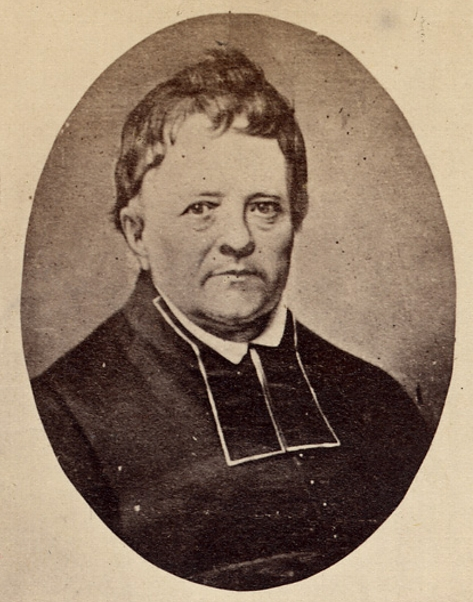
- Born: May 9, 1776; Philadelphia
- Died: July 17, 1854 (aged 78); Quebec City, Canada East

Thomas Maguire (May 9, 1776 – July 17, 1854) was an American-born Canadian Roman Catholic priest, a vicar general and an educator.

Maguire was born in Philadelphia to new immigrants from Ireland. Loyalists, the Maguire family relocated to Halifax, Nova Scotia in the same year.

Maguire was interested in education and in May 1821 Joseph-Octave Plessis appointed him as part of a committee at Quebec to prepare a constitution for the Quebec Education Society. The committee was led by Joseph-François Perrault.

He supported Bishop Jean-Jacques Lartigue in his struggle with the Sulpicians in the Montreal district.
