= Jean-François Hubert =

- Bishop of Quebec
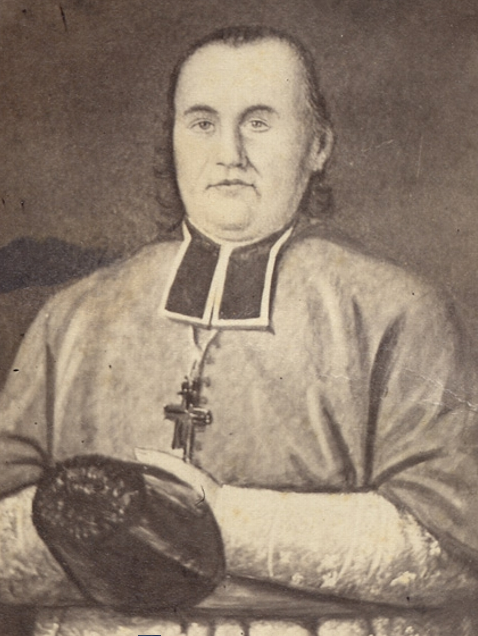
- Installed: June 12, 1788
- Term ended: September 1, 1797
- Predecessor: Louis-Philippe Mariauchau d'Esgly
- Successor: Pierre Denaut
- Other post: Coadjutor Bishop of Quebec

Personal details
- Born: February 23, 1739 Quebec City, Canada, New France
- Died: October 17, 1797 (aged 58) Quebec City, Lower Canada

Jean-François Hubert, (February 23, 1739 – October 17, 1797), bishop of Quebec, trained at the Sulpician seminary in Montreal. He was taken under the protection of Bishop Dubreil and served for a time as the bishop's secretary.

== Life ==
Jean-François Hubert was born at Quebec, 23 February 1739, the son of Jacques-François and Marie-Louise Maranda. After studying classics and theology at the Petit Séminaire de Québec, followed in 1755 by the study of theology at the Grand Séminaire. Hubert served as secretary to Bishop Pontbriand In the summer of 1759, when Quebec was under attack by the British, Hubert and other seminarians moved to Saint-Sulpice Seminary (Montreal). When the Bishop came to Montreal in October, Hubert resumed his duties as secretary until the bishop's death in June 1760.

Hubert returned to Quebec the following year, and became secretary to vicar general Jean-Olivier Briand. Given the political situation, the appointment of a successor to Pontbriand was complicated. By then Quebec was under British control, and approval had to be sought from the government, which seemed precluded by law from granting it to a Catholic priest in British territory. Briand sailed for England, where it was suggested that were he to be consecrated in France, he might be recognized as "superintendent of the Catholic church in Canada". Briand left for France ostensibly to visit his mother, and while there was consecrated Bishop of Quebec in Paris on 16 March 1766. He arrived back in Quebec the following June. Thus it was that due to the lack of a bishop, six years elapsed before Hubert could be ordained, which occurred about three weeks after Bishop Briand's return.

During Briand's absence, Hubert had worked at the seminary in Quebec. Upon the bishop's return, he became his secretary. In 1765 he was a director of the Petit Séminaire, and three years later, a director of the Grand Séminaire, where he served as bursar. The following year he became the Superior.

When the Americans besieged Quebec in 1775, he urged several students to join the defenders, and harbored and fed both wounded and prisoners of war. Hubert had a desire for missionary work, and in 1778, resigned from the seminary to take up the position as Briand's special envoy to the Illinois mission. He returned the following spring and was appointed priest at Sainte-Famille on the Île d'Orléans, and also vicar general. In 1781 he was sent to Notre-Dame-de l’Assomption near Detroit, left vacant due to the death of its priest. He remained there four years.

Briand resigned due to ill health, and was succeeded by his coadjutor, Louis-Philippe Mariauchau d'Esgly, who then chose Hubert as his coadjutor. Hubert was consecrated titular Bishop of Almyra in November 1786 at the Cathedral of Notre-Dame de Québec. D’Esgly died in June 1788, and Hubert became Bishop of the Diocese of Quebec.

The governor strongly recommended the pro-British parish priest Charles-François Bailly de Messein as coadjutor. Bishop Hubert thought it best not to oppose the appointment, but neither did he give Bailly any significant assignments. This led to difficulties between the two, but the retired Briand and the rest of the clergy supported Hubert. Hubert considered petitioning for the split of his large diocese, but the deferred on the realization that assuming the government raised no objections, Bailly would likely be given the new diocese.

In 1789 the government broached of a mixed university, under the name of Royal Institution, for Catholics and Protestants alike, to be subsidized out of the revenues of the Jesuits' estates. Hubert had strong reservations, but his coadjutor endorsed the idea. Among a number of considerations, Hubert thought the income from the Jesuit property should be used to re-open the Jesuit college. In spite of opposition from unexpected quarters, and with the support of the clergy and a number of prominent citizens, the Bishop successfully thwarted the plan. Bailly and Hubert were reconciled before Bailly's death in 1794. Hubert chose his vicar general, Pierre Denaut as his next coadjutor.

To supply the dearth of priests caused by the change of regime, Bishop Briand had, for thirty years, vainly begged the British Government for permission to recruit clergy in France. When the French Revolution cast numerous Frenchmen on England's hospitality, several exiled priests were allowed to enter Canada. Bishop Hubert warmly greeted these auxiliaries, who replaced providentially the fast disappearing survivors of the Jesuit and Récollet Orders. Leary of anti-clerical ideas being exported from France, he also reminded his flock of their duty to support the government as loyal citizens. He recognized the increased ethnic diversity in the Maritimes and advocated sending more Irish priests to Halifax.

As Hubert's health worsened, he resigned in September 1797 and died about a month later.
