= Archdiocese of Quebec =

Catholic ecclesiastical territory

Coordinates: 46.8138°N 71.2061°W

Archdiocese of Québec Archidiœcesis Quebecensis Archidiocèse de Québec
- Coat of arms

Location
- Country: Canada
- Territory: Quebec City
- Ecclesiastical province: Quebec

Statistics
- Area: 35,180 km^{2} (13,580 sq mi)
- Population: Total; Catholics: (as of 2017); 1,277,354; 1,015,815 (79.5%)
- Parishes: 40

Information
- Denomination: Catholic Church
- Sui iuris church: Latin Church
- Rite: Roman Rite
- Established: 12 January 1658; 368 years ago
- Cathedral: Notre-Dame de Québec
- Patron saint: Immaculate Conception and Louis IX of France
- Secular priests: 737

Current leadership
- Pope: Leo XIV
- Archbishop: Gérald Lacroix
- Auxiliary Bishops: Marc Pelchat; Juan Carlos Londoño

Map

Website
- www.ecdq.org

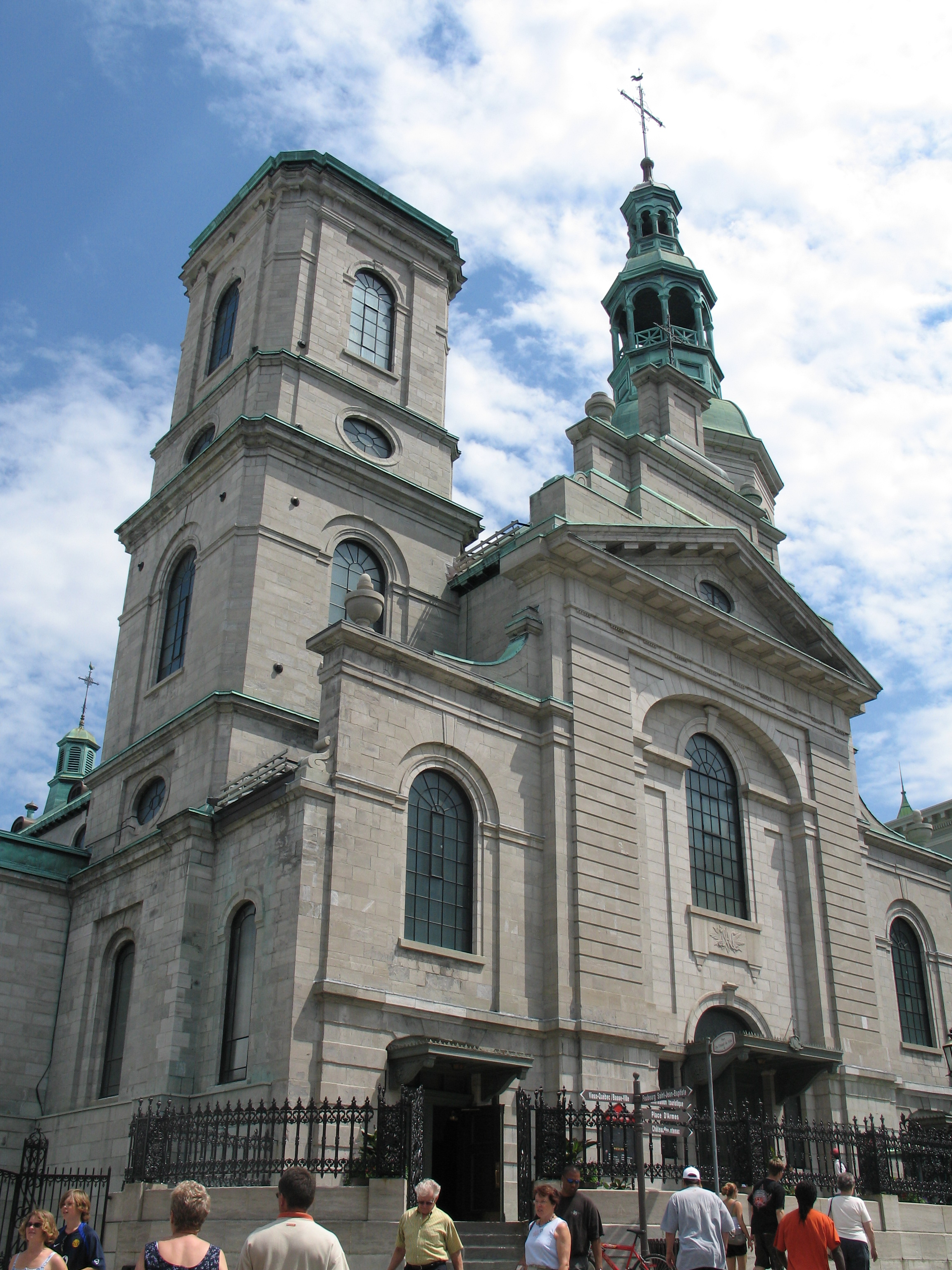
Notre-Dame de Québec Cathedral

Ecclesiastical Province of Québec
Cathedrals:
1 Cathedral-Basilica of Notre-Dame de Québec
2 Assumption Cathedral (Trois-Rivières)
3 Saint-François-Xavier Cathedral
4 St. Ann's Cathedral (La Pocatière)

The Archdiocese of Québec (Latin: Archidiœcesis Quebecensis; French: Archidiocèse de Québec) is a Latin Church ecclesiastical jurisdiction or archdiocese of the Catholic Church in Quebec, Canada. It is the oldest episcopal see in the New World north of Mexico and the primatial see of Canada. The Archdiocese of Quebec is also the metropolitan see of an ecclesiastical province with the suffragan dioceses of Chicoutimi, Sainte-Anne-de-la-Pocatière and Trois-Rivières. The archdiocese's cathedral is Notre-Dame de Québec in Quebec City.

== History ==
=== New France ===
From the beginning of colonisation of the New World, the Church influenced the politics and policies of New France. Even during the first voyages of Jacques Cartier in the 16th century, missionary priests would accompany the explorers on their voyages to the New World. After two failed attempts to settle in Acadia, in 1608, Québec City was founded by Samuel de Champlain, giving the Church a solid base to spread the faith to the Indigenous populations. In 1615, the Recollet missionaries arrived in Québec, followed by the Jesuit missionaries 10 years later. Their presence would help drive the colonies, giving the colonizers a moral reason for their presence, as well as giving the Church an influential position in domestic and local policy. In 1658, the Church would establish an apostolic vicariate by Pope Alexander VII, 124 years since the first voyage of Jacques Cartier in 1534. The vicar apostolic was François de Laval. As the vicar apostolic of Québec, Laval was a central member of the Sovereign Council of New France. Arguably, while he was charged with only the spiritual matters of New France, he had the most influence as he was the highest representative of the Church, as well as having excellent relations with King Louis XIV. In 1663, Laval would establish the Seminary of Québec. In 1674, with the population of New France growing rapidly and the Seminary of Québec enrolling more students, Pope Clement X elevated the apostolic vicariate to a diocese, which would depend directly on the Holy See; this provision would later secure its permanence after New France passed into the hands of Great Britain in 1760. At its peak, in 1712, the Diocese of Québec covered the entire American continent to the Gulf of Mexico. Only the British colonies that would later become the United States and the Spanish colony of Florida were not under the authority of the Bishop of Quebec.

=== British rule ===
Following the establishment of British rule in Quebec in 1763, the new regime implemented a series of laws which restricted the rights of Catholics. However, in 1774 the Parliament of Great Britain passed the Quebec Act, which allowed the Catholic Church to collect tithes on the businesses and property of Catholics in Quebec. In 1819, the diocese was elevated to an archdiocese, and by 1840 Canadian political leaders formally recognized the Church. Over the course of the 19th century, the Archdiocese of Quebec was split into new dioceses as Quebec's population increased.

=== Today ===
It lost large pieces of its territory with the formation of the Dioceses of Halifax and Kingston in 1817, the Diocese of Charlottetown in 1829, the Diocese of St. Boniface in 1844 and the Diocese of Montréal in 1852.

It is common, but not inherent to the title, for the Archbishops of Québec to either be named to the cardinalate while serving or when transferred to a larger archdiocese or to a post in the Roman Curia.

On 17 September 2024, Pope Francis appointed Archbishop Jean-Marc Aveline as the Holy See's special envoy for the Archdiocese of Quebec's 350th anniversary celebrations on September 20–22.

=== Primate of Canada ===
Since 24 January 1956, the Archbishop of Quebec has the ceremonial title of Primate of Canada; the title was given to the reigning Archbishop of Quebec by Pope Pius XII.

== Bishop's Palace and Chapel of Bishop's Palace ==
Built in 1693 to 1694 on order by Jean-Baptiste de La Croix de Chevrières de Saint-Vallier, the Chapel of Bishop's Palace was a private place of worship for the Bishop of Quebec and located within the residence (or Bishop's Palace).

Following the British conquest the chapel was leased to Legislative Council of the province of Quebec from 1777 to 1791 and successors Legislative Assembly of Lower Canada and Legislative Council of Lower Canada from 1791 to 1833.

The chapel was demolished in 1831 to build a new addition where the two legislative houses met from 1834 to 1839. The new addition and bishop's residence would survive until it was demolished in 1852–1853. A new bishop's residence by Thomas Baillarge was built in 1844 to 1847 slight north.

Preparing for the return of Parliament to Quebec City, a new parliamentary building was completed from 1853 to 1854 on Côte de la Montagne, but it burned down shortly after. Parliament relocated within the city to Quebec Music Hall and Quebec City Courthouse until capital rotated out again.

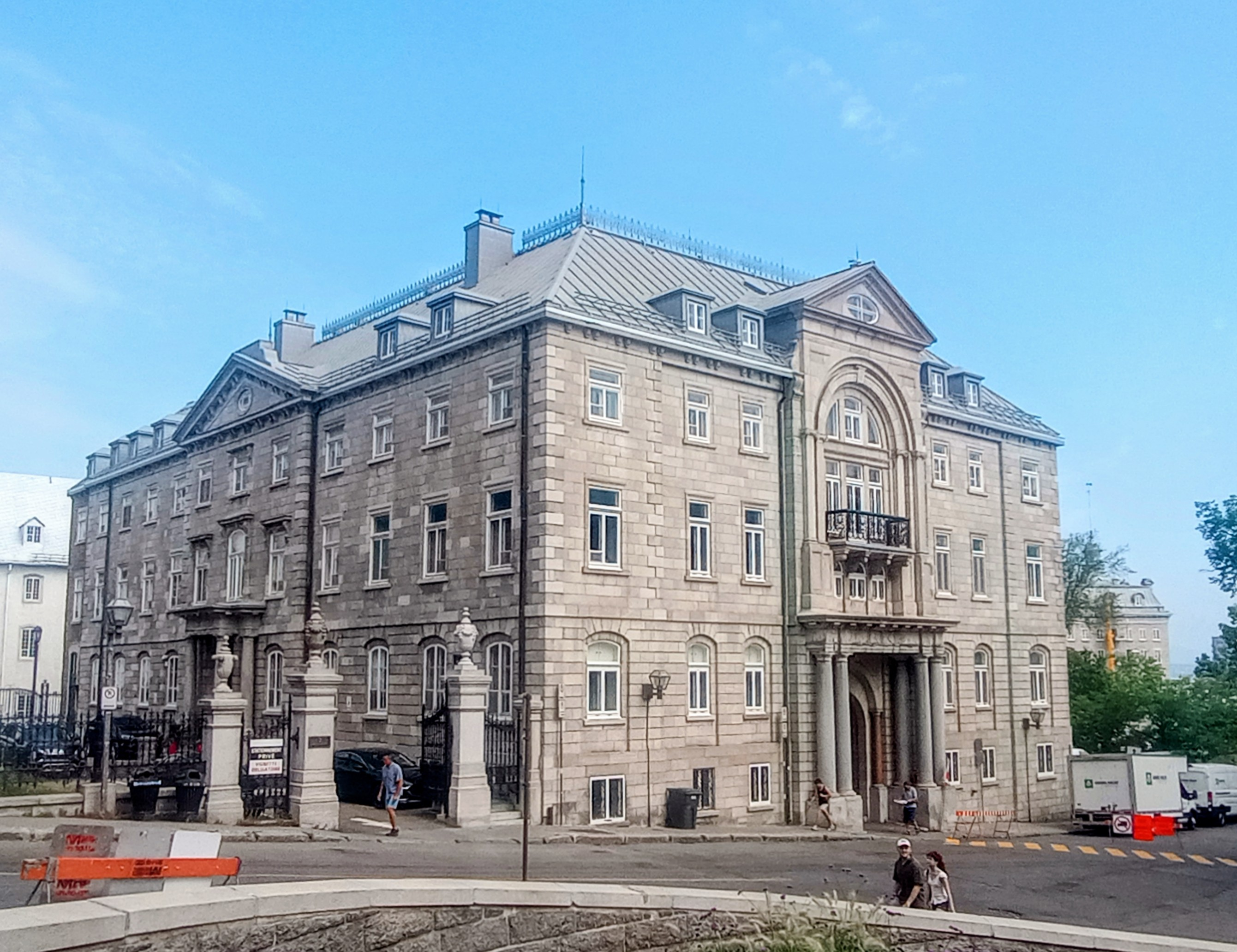
Residence or Palace of the Bishop

Rebuilt by 1860 and served Parliament until 1866. The building was repurposed as Parliament of the new province of Quebec in 1867. A fire destroyed this building in 1883 and decision was made to relocate to the nearly complete new home which had begun construction since 1877. The burned-out building was demolished by 1894. Today the old Parliament site is now home to Parc Montmorency.

== Leadership ==
=== Ordinaries ===
Below is a list of individuals who have led the Archdiocese of Quebec and its antecedent jurisdictions since its founding.

==== Apostolic Vicars of New France ====
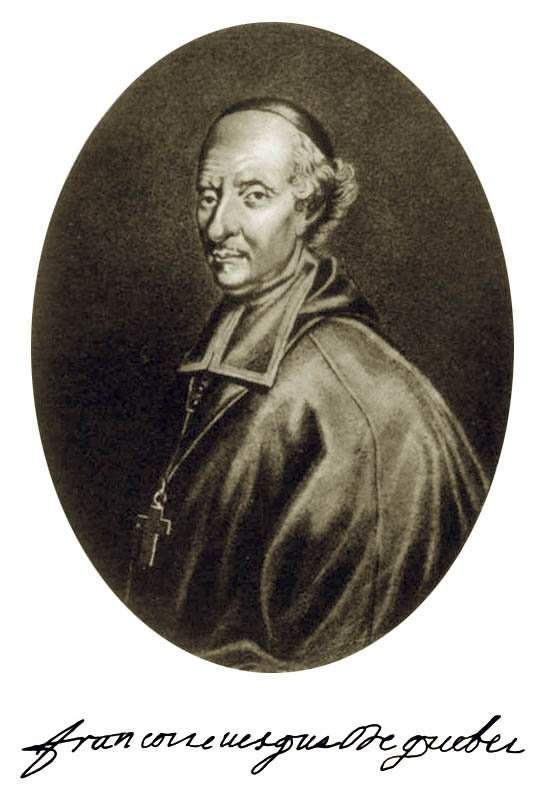
Saint François de Montmorency-Laval, first bishop of Quebec

- François de Laval (1658–1674)

==== Bishops of Québec ====
- François de Laval (1674–1688)
- Jean-Baptiste de la Croix de Chevrières de Saint-Vallier (1688–1727)
- Louis-François Duplessis de Mornay (1727–1733)
- Pierre-Herman Dosquet (1733–1739)
- François-Louis de Pourroy de Lauberivière (1739–1740)
- Henri-Marie Dubreil de Pontbriand (1741–1760)
- Jean-Olivier Briand (1766–1784)
- Louis-Philippe Mariauchau d'Esgly (1784–1788)
- Jean-François Hubert (1788–1797)
- Pierre Denaut (1797–1806)
- Joseph-Octave Plessis (1806–1819)

==== Archbishops of Québec ====
- Joseph-Octave Plessis (1819–1825)
- Bernard-Claude Panet (1825–1833)
- Joseph Signay (1833–1850)
- Pierre-Flavien Turgeon (1850–1867)
- Charles-François Baillargeon (1867–1870)
- Cardinal Elzéar-Alexandre Taschereau (1870–1898)
- Cardinal Louis Nazaire Bégin (1898–1925)
- Paul-Eugène Roy (1925–1926)
- Cardinal Felix-Raymond-Marie Rouleau (1926–1931)
- Cardinal Jean-Marie-Rodrigue Villeneuve (1931–1947)
- Cardinal Maurice Roy (1947–1981)
- Cardinal Louis-Albert Vachon (1981–1990)
- Maurice Couture (1990–2002)
- Cardinal Marc Ouellet (2002–2010), appointed Prefect of the Congregation for Bishops
- Cardinal Gérald Lacroix (2011–present)

=== Coadjutor archbishops ===
Under the Code of Canon Law, the coadjutor bishop has the right of succession (cum jure successionis) upon the death, retirement or resignation of the diocesan bishop he is assisting. All coadjutor ordinaries except for Charles-François Bailly de Messein eventually succeeded to become head of the Archdiocese of Quebec or its antecedent jurisdictions.

- Louis-François Duplessis de Mornay (1713–1727), as coadjutor bishop
- Pierre-Herman Dosquet (1729–1733), as coadjutor bishop
- Louis-Philippe Mariauchau d'Esgly (1772–1784), as coadjutor bishop
- Jean-François Hubert (1785–1788), as coadjutor bishop
- Charles-François Bailly de Messein (1788–1794), as coadjutor bishop; did not succeed to the see
- Pierre Denaut (1794–1797), as coadjutor bishop
- Joseph-Octave Plessis (1800–1806), as coadjutor bishop
- Bernard-Claude Panet (1806–1825)
- Joseph Signay (1826–1833)
- Pierre-Flavien Turgeon (1834–1850)
- Charles-François Baillargeon (1851–1867)
- Louis Nazaire Bégin (1892–1898); future Cardinal
- Paul-Eugène Roy (1920–1925)

=== Auxiliary bishops ===
Unlike coadjutors, auxiliary bishops do not have the right of succession, per canon 975, §1 of the 1983 Code of Canon Law. Four auxiliaries went on to become Archbishop of Quebec.

- Pierre-Herman Dosquet (1727–1729), appointed coadjutor of this archdiocese
- Aeneas Bernard MacEachern (1819–1821), appointed Bishop of Charlottetown, Prince Edward Island
- Jean-Jacques Lartigue (1820–1836), appointed Bishop of Montréal, Québec
- Pierre-Antoine Tabeau (1834); did not take effect
- Joseph Norbert Provencher (1820–1844), appointed Vicar Apostolic of North-West (Nord-Ouest)
- Paul-Eugène Roy (1908–1920), appointed coadjutor of this archdiocese
- Joseph Alfred Langlois (1924–1926), appointed Bishop of Valleyfield, Québec
- Joseph-Omer Plante (1927–1948)
- Georges Léon Pelletier (1942–1947), appointed Bishop of Trois-Rivières, Québec
- Charles-Omer Garant (1948–1962)
- Lionel Audet (1952–1983)
- Laurent Noël (1963–1975) (Apostolic Administrator of Hauterive, Québec, 1974–1975), appointed Bishop of Trois-Rivières, Québec
- Louis-Albert Vachon (1977–1981), appointed Archbishop of this archdiocese; future Cardinal
- Jean-Paul Labrie (1977–1995)
- Maurice Couture (1982–1988), appointed Bishop of Baie-Comeau, Québec; later returned to this archdiocese as Archbishop
- Marc Leclerc (1982–1998)
- Joseph Paul Pierre Morissette (1987–1990), appointed Bishop of Baie-Comeau, Québec
- Clément Fecteau (1989–1996), appointed Bishop of Sainte-Anne-de-la-Pocatière, Québec
- Eugène Tremblay (1994–2004), appointed Bishop of Amos, Québec
- Jean-Pierre Blais (1994–2008), appointed Bishop of Baie-Comeau, Québec
- Jean Gagnon (1998–2002), appointed Bishop of Gaspé, Québec
- Pierre-André Fournier (2005–2008), appointed Archbishop of Rimouski, Québec
- Gilles Lemay (2005–2011), appointed Bishop of Amos, Québec
- Gérald Lacroix (2009–2011), appointed Archbishop of this archdiocese; future Cardinal
- Paul Lortie (2009–2012), appointed Bishop of Mont-Laurier, Québec
- Denis Grondin (2011–2015), appointed Archbishop of Rimouski, Québec
- Louis Corriveau (2016–2019), appointed Bishop of Joliette, Québec
- Martin Laliberté (2019–2022)
- Marc Pelchat (2016–2025)

=== Other priests of this diocese who became bishops ===
- Thomas Maguire, appointed Coadjutor Vicar Apostolic of Nova Scotia in 1819; did not take effect
- Rémi Gaulin, appointed Coadjutor Bishop of Kingston, Ontario in 1833
- Michael Power, appointed Bishop of Toronto, Ontario in 1841
- William Dollard, appointed Bishop of New Brunswick in 1842
- Francois Norbert Blanchet, appointed Vicar Apostolic of Oregon Territory, USA in 1843
- John Charles Prince, appointed Coadjutor Bishop of Montréal, Québec in 1844
- Augustin Magloire Alexandre Blanchet, appointed Bishop of Walla Walla, Oregon, USA in 1846
- Joseph La Rocque, appointed Coadjutor Bishop of Montréal, Québec in 1852
- Charles La Rocque, appointed Bishop of Saint-Hyacinthe, Québec in 1866
- Jean-Pierre-François Laforce Langevin, appointed Bishop of Rimouski (St. Germain of), Québec in 1867
- Olivier Elzéar Mathieu, appointed Bishop of Regina, Saskatchewan in 1911
- Arthur Douville, appointed Auxiliary Bishop of Saint-Hyacinthe, Québec in 1939
- Bruno Desrochers, appointed Bishop of Sainte-Anne-de-la-Pocatière, Québec in 1951
- Paul Bernier, appointed titular Archbishop in 1952
- Louis Joseph Jean Marie Fortier, appointed Auxiliary Bishop of Sainte-Anne-de-la-Pocatière, Québec in 1960
- Jean-Guy Couture, appointed Bishop of Hauterive, Québec in 1975
- Noël Simard, appointed Auxiliary Bishop of Sault Sainte Marie, Ontario in 2008

== Recent appointments ==
On February 22, 2011, Vatican Information Service (VIS) and Catholic News Service (CNS), announced that Pope Benedict XVI had named the 53-year-old Bishop Gérald Lacroix, until then an Auxiliary Bishop (assistant bishop) of Quebec (since 2009), as the new Metropolitan Archbishop of the Quebec and Primate of Canada. As archbishop, he succeeds Marc Ouellet, his former superior, who became the prefect of one of the Roman Curia's most important administrative departments, the Sacred Congregation for Bishops, in July 2010. Lacroix is a member of the Quebec-based Saint Pope Pius X Secular Institute. Lacroix was born in Saint-Hilaire-de-Dorset, Quebec, on July 27, 1957, the eldest son in a family of seven children. At the age of 8, his family settled in Manchester, largest city of New Hampshire (in the U.S.), where he attended the parochial elementary school of Saint Anthony of Padua and Trinity High School. He studied one year at Saint Anselm College in neighboring Goffstown. He joined the Pius X Secular Institute as a consecrated lay member in 1975, and made perpetual vows in 1982. The same year, he was named secretary general of the institute. He earned a master's degree in pastoral theology at Laval University, and from 1985 to 1987, directed the La Maison du Renouveau, a formation and Christian renewal centre. He was ordained a priest on October 8, 1988, in the parish of Notre-Dame-de-la-Recouvrance. He was ordained to the episcopacy as Auxiliary Bishop of Quebec on May 24, 2009.

On December 12, 2011, Pope Benedict appointed Gaetan Proulx and Denis Grondin Jr. as Auxiliary Bishops of the Archdiocese of Quebec to serve under Lacroix. They were ordained to the episcopacy as Auxiliary Bishops of Quebec on February 25, 2012.

On May 4, 2015, Pope Francis appointed Bishop Grondin as Archbishop of Rimouski.

On July 2, 2016, Pope Francis appointed Bishop Proulx as Bishop of Gaspé. On October 25, 2016, the same pope appointed Louis Corriveau and Marc Pelchat as Auxiliary Bishops of the Archdiocese. In 2019, he transferred Bishop Corriveau to a diocesan post elsewhere, and on November 25 appointed Martin Laliberté, P.M.E. as auxiliary here.

== See also ==
- Ursulines of Quebec
- Manresa Spirituality Centre
