= Felix-Raymond-Marie Rouleau =

Canadian Cardinal of the Roman Catholic Church

His Eminence Félix-Raymond-Marie Rouleau O.P.
- Archbishop of Québec
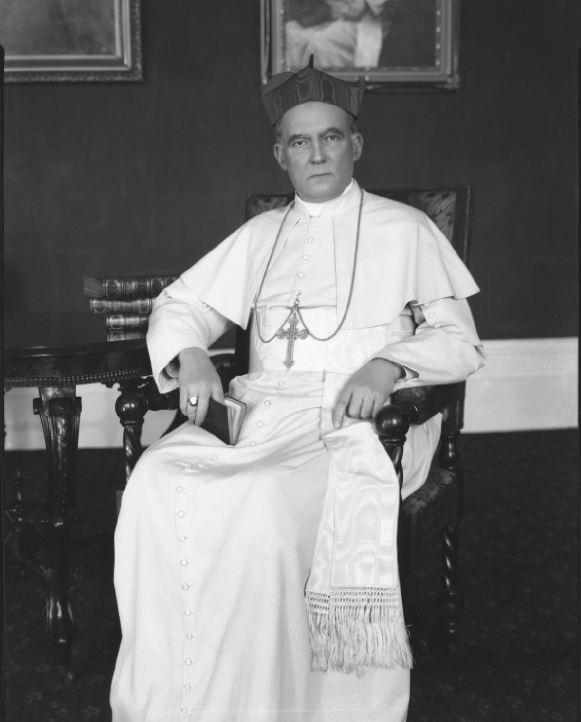
- Rouleau c. 1925 in his Dominican habit.
- Church: Roman Catholic Church
- Archdiocese: Québec
- See: Québec
- Appointed: 9 July 1926
- Installed: 8 November 1926
- Term ended: 30 May 1931
- Predecessor: Paul-Eugène Roy
- Successor: Jean-Marie-Rodrigue Villeneuve
- Other post: Cardinal-Priest of San Pietro in Montorio (1927-31)
- Previous post: Bishop of Valleyfield (1923-26)

Orders
- Ordination: 31 July 1892 by Paul-Mathieu de la Foata
- Consecration: 22 May 1923 by Pietro di Maria
- Created cardinal: 19 December 1927 by Pope Pius XI
- Rank: Cardinal-Priest

Personal details
- Born: Félix Rouleau; 6 April 1866 L'Isle-Verte, Canada
- Died: 30 May 1931 (aged 65) Québec, Canada
- Buried: Cathedral-Basilica of Notre-Dame de Québec
- Parents: Félix Rouleau; Luce Irvine
- Motto: Caritas veritas ("Truth in charity")
- Coat of arms

Félix-Raymond-Marie Rouleau O.P. (April 6, 1866 – May 30, 1931) was a Canadian Cardinal of the Roman Catholic Church. He served as Archbishop of Quebec from 1926 until his death, and was elevated to the cardinalate in 1927.

== Early life ==
One of eleven children, Félix Rouleau was born in L'Isle-Verte, Quebec, to Félix Rouleau and Luce Irvine. His father was a farmer and his mother was of Scottish descent. He attended the seminary of Rimouski from 1879 to 1885, and joined the Order of Preachers (more commonly known as the Dominicans) in Saint-Hyacinthe on December 8, 1886.

Taking the name Raymond-Marie, Rouleau made his final vows on August 3, 1888. He studied theology under Antonin Sertillanges at the Dominican monastery in Corbara, on the island of Corsica. He made his final vows on August 4, 1891.

== Priesthood ==
Rouleau was ordained to the priesthood by Bishop Paul-Matthieu de La Foata on July 31, 1892. Upon his return to Canada in 1894, he served as professor and master of novices at the Dominican novitiate in Saint-Hyacinthe until 1897. He was also director of studies (1897–1898) and regent of studies (1898–1900) at the novitiate.

From 1900 to 1909, Rouleau was prior of the Dominican convent in Ottawa. He also served as regent of studies, director of spiritual retreats, and professor of moral and pastoral theology, Sacred Scripture, and canon law. He attended the Plenary Council of Quebec in 1909, and was a counsellor in the Apostolic Delegation to Canada. Rouleau was also an advocate on behalf of the Franco-Ontarian community in the dispute over Regulation 17, which forbade French instruction in Ontario schools. He served as provincial superior of the Dominicans in Canada from 1919 to 1923.

== Episcopal career ==
On March 9, 1923, Rouleau was appointed the second Bishop of Valleyfield by Pope Pius XI. He received his episcopal consecration on the following May 22 from Archbishop Pietro di Maria, with Bishops Félix Couturier, OP, and Georges Gauthier serving as co-consecrators.

Rouleau was later named the seventh Archbishop of Quebec on July 9, 1926. Pius XI created him Cardinal Priest of San Pietro in Montorio in the consistory of December 19, 1927. He was the third Canadian raised to the College of Cardinals, after Elzéar-Alexandre Taschereau and Louis Nazaire Bégin. In 1930, he was dangerously bruised and cut when a blowout crashed his motor into a ditch near Levis; he received Extreme Unction but later convalesced.

Rouleau died from angina pectoris in his episcopal residence, at age 65. He is buried at Notre-Dame de Québec Cathedral.

Catholic Church titles
Preceded by Joseph-Médard Émard	Bishop of Valleyfield; 1923–1926	Succeeded by Joseph Alfred Langlois
Preceded by Paul-Eugène Roy	Archbishop of Quebec; 1926–1931	Succeeded by Jean-Marie-Rodrigue Villeneuve
