= François-Louis de Pourroy de Lauberivière =

Canadian bishop

- Bishop of Quebec
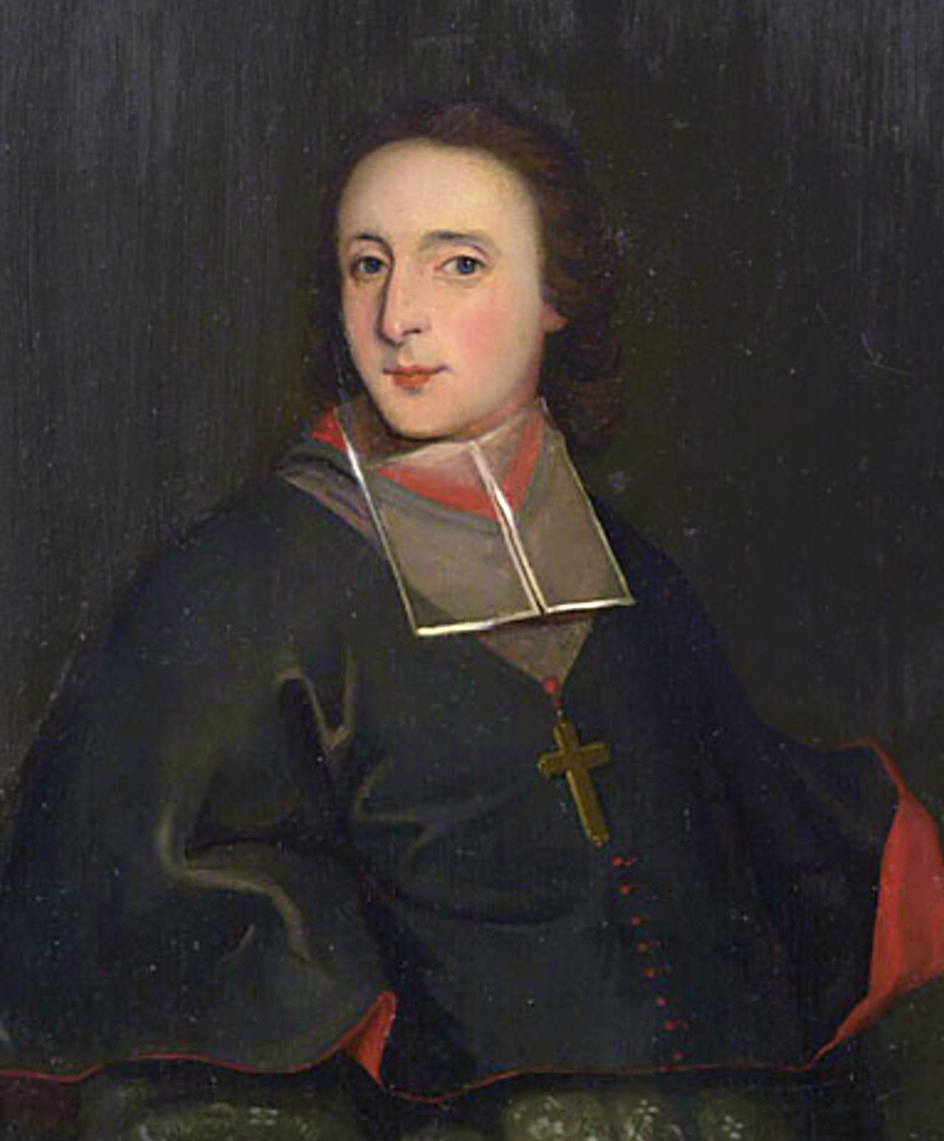
- Diocese: Quebec
- Installed: 1739
- Term ended: 1740
- Predecessor: Pierre-Herman Dosquet
- Successor: Henri-Marie Dubreil de Pontbriand

Personal details
- Born: June 16, 1711 Grenoble, France
- Died: August 20, 1740 (aged 29) Quebec City, Canada

François-Louis de Pourroy de Lauberivière (June 16, 1711 – August 20, 1740) was the fifth bishop of the diocese of Quebec (1739–1740). He was trained in France and had a doctor of theology from the Sorbonne.

== Biography ==
François-Louis was ordained a priest in 1735 after completing his studies at the Jesuit college in Grenoble and a seminary in Paris. In March, 1739, Louis XV appointed him to succeed Bishop Pierre Hermann Dosquet from Quebec.

He sailed from La Rochelle on the Rubis on 10 June 1740 along with various priests and servants. A fever broke out when they reached the Grand Banks of Newfoundland and quickly spread through the lower status passengers. The bishop and his priests worked wherever needed to assist those in need.

At the request of the Intendant of New France, Gilles Hocquart, Pourroy de Lauberivière disembarked at Île-aux-Coudres to make his way to Quebec and arrived there on August 8, 1740. He began the usual round of welcomes including dinners with the Intendant and governor Beauharnois. He fell ill on August 13 and died on August 20.
