= Paul-Eugène Roy =

Catholic bishop

The Most Reverend Paul-Eugène Roy
- Archbishop of Quebec
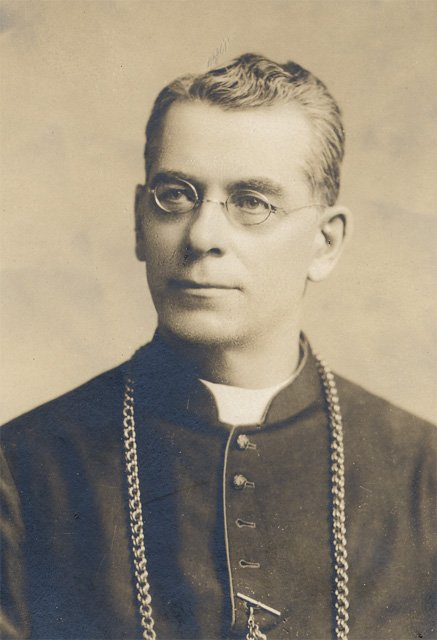
- Installed: July 18, 1925
- Term ended: February 20, 1926
- Predecessor: Louis-Nazaire Bégin
- Successor: Felix-Raymond-Marie Rouleau

Orders
- Ordination: June 13, 1886

Personal details
- Born: November 8, 1859 Berthier (Berthier-sur-Mer), Lower Canada
- Died: February 20, 1926 (aged 66) Quebec City, Quebec
- Coat of arms

Paul-Eugène Roy (8 November 1859 – 20 February 1926) was a Canadian Roman Catholic priest, and Archbishop of Quebec.
