= Pierre-Herman Dosquet =

- Bishop of Quebec
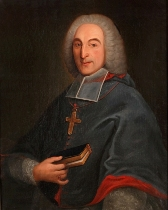
- Diocese: Quebec
- Installed: 1733
- Term ended: 1739
- Predecessor: Louis-François Duplessis de Mornay
- Successor: François-Louis de Pourroy de Lauberivière

Personal details
- Born: 4 March 1691 Liège, Prince-Bishopric of Liège
- Died: 4 March 1777 (aged 86) Paris, France

Pierre-Herman Dosquet (4 March 1691 – 4 March 1777) was the fourth bishop of Quebec.

== Life ==
Pierre-Herman Dosquet was born in Liège, Prince-Bishopric of Liège, the son of Laurent and Anne-Jeanne Goffar. His father was a merchant. In 1715, Dosquet entered at the Seminary of Saint-Sulpice, Paris, and was ordained the following year. In 1721, he joined the Sulpicians and volunteered for the Canadian mission. He arrived in Canada that July and spent the next two years as chaplain to Congregation of Notre Dame of Montreal. Ill health and the climate forced him to return France.

He was appointed superior of the Seminary of Lisieux in France, became a director of the Séminaire des Missions Étrangères, and was sent to Rome as procurator-general. He was made procurator general for the apostolic vicars of the East Indies and consecrated titular Bishop of Samos by Pope Benedict XIII in December 1725.

In December 1727, Jean-Baptiste de La Croix de Chevrières de Saint-Vallier, bishop of Quebec, died. Saint-Vallier's coadjutor was Louis-François Duplessis de Mornay, but Bishop Mornay never went to Canada. In 1729, Dosquet was named administrator, with Mornay as titular bishop. He arrived in Quebec in September. The following year, Dosquet was appointed coadjutor.

Dosquet had to solve many difficulties that had arisen towards the close of the life of Bishop St. Vallier. He offended both the governor and the intendant by getting the Minister of Marine to forbid them free access to the convents; and he was zealous for the suppression of the liquor traffic. He attempted to increase the tithe, reform monastic life and increase episcopal revenues. He forbade schoolmasters to teach girls, and priests to wear wigs. He was also a slaveowner.

Some of his edicts created tension with the clergy; and as he was a Walloon, he was considered an outsider. As Dosquet had the responsibility but not the revenues attached to the bishopric of Quebec, in 1732 he returned to France to either get Mornay to come to Quebec or resign.

In 1733, after Bishop Mornay's resignation, he succeeded to the See of Quebec, where he promoted education, primary and classical. A patron and benefactor of the Congregation of the Holy Sirit, he confided almost exclusively to it the missions of Acadia, the islands of the Gulf of St. Lawrence, Cape Breton, Newfoundland, and probably Labrador. He rewarded that congregation by generous endowments, including Sarcelle, a property near Paris, which until the Revolution yielded an annual revenue of 3000 livres.

In 1735, he decided that he required a change of climate and left for France. He was in somewhat the same position of his predecessor, not wishing to resign, nor to return to Quebec. He resigned in 1739, only after being granted valuable benefices. He was succeeded by Bishop François-Louis de Pourroy de Lauberivière. Thenceforth he resided chiefly in Rome, attending to the interests of his former diocese, especially after the English conquest. He died in Paris in 1777.
