= Joseph-Octave Plessis =

Canadian Roman Catholic clergyman

His Excellency Joseph-Octave Plessis
- Archbishop of Quebec
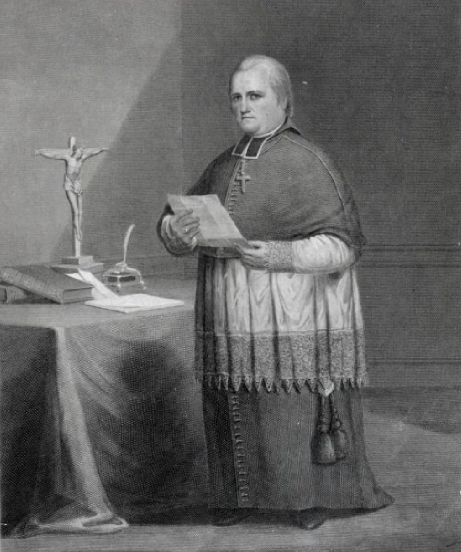
- Plessis in 1810
- Diocese: Quebec
- Installed: January 17, 1806
- Term ended: December 4, 1825
- Predecessor: Pierre Denaut
- Successor: Bernard-Claude Panet

Orders
- Ordination: March 11, 1786

Personal details
- Born: March 3, 1763 Montreal, Lower Canada
- Died: December 4, 1825 (aged 62) Quebec City, Lower Canada
- Coat of arms

Joseph-Octave Plessis (March 3, 1763 – December 4, 1825) was a Canadian Roman Catholic clergyman from Quebec. He was the first archbishop of the Roman Catholic Archdiocese of Quebec after the diocese was elevated to the status of an archdiocese.

Plessis cultivated a new generation of priests during the difficult period leading up to the Lower Canada Rebellion, including Jean-Baptiste-Antoine Ferland, Narcisse-Charles Fortier, Jean-Baptiste Kelly, Thomas Maguire, and Pierre-Antoine Tabeau.

== Biography ==
Appletons' Cyclopaedia of American Biography stated that Plessis "studied classics in the College de Montreal, but refused to continue his education, and his father, who was a blacksmith, set him to work at the forge. After a short experience at manual labour, he consented to enter the Petit Seminaire of Quebec in 1780. On finishing his course he taught belles-lettres and rhetoric in the College of Montreal, and notwithstanding his youth became secretary to Bishop Briand. He was ordained priest on 29 Nov., 1786".

Shortly after his ordination he was made secretary to Bishop Jean-Francois Hubert, and he exercised so much influence over this prelate that he really filled the functions of auxiliary bishop. In 1792 he was appointed Curé of Notre-Dame at Quebec.

Bishop Pierre Denaut, Hubert's successor, named Plessis his grand vicar in 1797, and at the same time announced his intention of appointing him coadjutor bishop. The popularity of Plessis with French Canadians excited the hostility of the English party, and General Prescott, the governor of the province, opposed the appointment, but he finally yielded to the demands of public opinion.

Plessis was consecrated bishop in the Cathedral of Quebec on 21 January 1801, in the presence of the governor and officials of the province. The death of Bishop Denaut raised him to the episcopal sea of Quebec in 1806. He began his administration under difficult circumstances. Efforts were made to appropriate the property of the Jesuits and of the Seminary of Montreal to the uses of the state, to organize an exclusively Protestant system of public instruction, and to give a power of veto on the nomination of priests and the erection of parishes to the English crown.

An unsuccessful attempt was made to prevent him from taking the oath of allegiance in his capacity as bishop of Quebec. In 1810 Gov. Craig sent a messenger to England to complain of the bishop's conduct, but the authorities adopted a conciliatory policy, Craig was recalled, and Sir George Prevost was sent to replace him. The new governor had several interviews with the bishop, who refused to make any concessions, and finally all his demands in behalf of the Roman Catholic Church in Canada were conceded. The part that he took during the War of 1812 in exciting the loyalty and warlike spirit of the French Canadians gained him the goodwill of England. He received letters from the government recognizing his title and jurisdiction as Roman Catholic bishop of Quebec, and granting him a pension of a thousand louis a year with a seat in the Legislative Council of Lower Canada.

== Legacy ==
Bishop Plessis was the first to introduce Christianity into the vast territory of Red River, and founded religious and educational institutions in Upper Canada and the provinces along the Gulf of St. Lawrence. In 1815 he had paid an extended visit to all the maritime colonies. His great work was the organization of his church in Canada. In 1818 he was nominated Archbishop of Quebec, and the rest of British America was formed into four suffragan sees. In the legislative council he was an ardent defender of the religious and civil rights of his co-religionists, and in 1822.

When the English government tried to force a union between Upper and Lower Canada, his energetic resistance counted for much in the failure of the plan. The reformation and development of Canadian education formed the great end of his life. He successfully resisted efforts to weaken the force of French-Canadian nationality through the medium of a system of popular education. The colleges of Nicolet and St. Hyacinth were founded through his encouragement, and schools and academies were established in every direction. He spent his time and income in searching out young men and educating them at his own expense. Some of the most eminent men of Canada owed their training to him. The passage of the education law of 1824 was to a great extent his work, and his correspondence with Lord Bathurst on this subject proved him a man of great diplomatic force.

== See also ==
- Thomas Maguire
