= Pierre-Antoine Tabeau =

Canadian Roman Catholic priest and vicar general

- Born: 11 October 1782; Montreal, Province of Quebec
- Died: 18 May 1835 (aged 52); Montreal, Lower Canada
- Known for: Roman Catholic priest and vicar general

Pierre-Antoine Tabeau (11 October 1782 – May 18, 1835) was a Roman Catholic priest and vicar general. He was the son of Jean-Baptiste Tabeau, a trader and militia man who was involved in the fur trade out of New France. He was a protégé of Joseph-Octave Plessis.
