= Pierre Denaut =

Catholic bishop

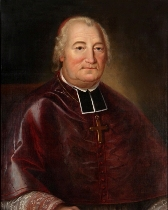
- Diocese: Roman Catholic diocese of Quebec
- Installed: 1797
- Term ended: 1806

Pierre Denaut (20 July 1743 – 17 January 1806) was the tenth bishop of the Roman Catholic diocese of Quebec and the last before it became an Archdiocese. He served as bishop from 1797 to 1806.

== Life ==
Pierre Denaut was born in Montreal on 20 July 1743, the seventh son of André and Françoise Boyer Denaut. His father was a stone mason. After studying at the Sulpician school in Montreal, in 1758 he entered the Petit Séminaire de Québec, but in the summer of 1759 moved to the Séminaire de Saint-Sulpice in Montreal. He was appointed secretary to Étienne Montgolfier, vicar general of Montreal.

Denaut was ordained priest in 1767 by Bishop Jean-Olivier Briand in the Church of Saint-Pierre, on the Île d'Orléans. Shortly after his ordination he served as parish priest at Soulange, having responsibility for the missions at Vaudreuil and Ile Perrot. During the American invasion in 1775, he kept his flock faithful to their sovereign. In 1788 he was made an archpriest; and in 1790 transferred to Longueuil.

Also in 1790, Bishop Jean-François Hubert appointed Denaut vicar-general of the Roman Catholic Archdiocese of Quebec. In May 1794 Bishop Bailly, coadjutor to Bishop Hubert, died and Hubert chose Denaut for the position. Denaut was consecrated on 29 June 1795 at the Church of Notre-Dame. Worn out with his labors, Bishop Hubert resigned in 1797.

Denaut took charge of the diocese, remained at Longueuil, near Montreal. He named Joseph-Octave Plessis, curé of Notre-Dame, as his vicar general to serve at Quebec, and in September 1797 named Jean-Henry-Auguste Roux, Superior of the Sulpician seminary, vicar general for the district of Montreal. Denaut indicated his intention to make Plessis his coadjutor. The popularity of Plessis with French Canadians excited the hostility of the English party. According to Appleton's "The Duke of Kent, was then holding court in Quebec, and at the same time carrying on an intrigue with a married woman in the neighboring village of Beauport. The parish priest of this town secretly favored the liaison, and, to reward his complaisance, the young prince used every effort to have him appointed coadjutor bishop." Bishop Denaut insisted on the choice of Plessis, who had been elected by the clergy, and declared that they neither should nor would hold another election. In presence of this unexpected resistance, the Canadian government withdrew their candidate, and General Prescott, the governor of the province, who opposed the appointment, finally yielded to the demands of public opinion.

Denaut visited his entire diocese, travelling through Upper Canada on his way to Detroit, in 1801 and 1802. There he created for English-speaking Catholics, the parishes of St. Andrew and St. Raphael, which he entrusted to Alexander Macdonell. In 1803, via Burlington and Boston, he visited the Maritime Provinces. He put an end to the celebration of patronal feasts in parishes where they gave rise to disorders, and worked closely with the religious congregations established in his diocese. An enlightened patron of education, the primary school founded by Abbé Brassard at Nicolet, he made a classical school, now the seminary of Nicolet. He also aided in enlarging Montreal College in 1804. Bishop Denaut is described as "a modest, humble, reflective man". He resisted the encroachments of a British governor claiming the right of presentation to parishes, and opposed the "Royal Institution" investing Protestants with the control of public instruction. He was both courteous towards temporal authorities and firm in the defence of episcopal rights.

Denaut died at Longueuil in 1806 and was buried in the parish church.

== Sources ==
- Hamelin, Jean; Paquin, Michel (1983). "Denaut, Pierre". In Halpenny, Francess G. (ed.). Dictionary of Canadian Biography. Vol. V (1801–1820) (online ed.). University of Toronto Press.
- Wilson, J. G.; Fiske, J., eds. (1900). "Denaut, Peter" . Appletons' Cyclopædia of American Biography. Vol. II. New York: D. Appleton. p. 139.

Religious titles
Preceded by Jean-François Hubert	Bishop of Quebec; 1797–1806	Succeeded by Joseph-Octave Plessis, Archbishop of Quebec
