= Henri-Marie Dubreil de Pontbriand =

Canadian Catholic prelate

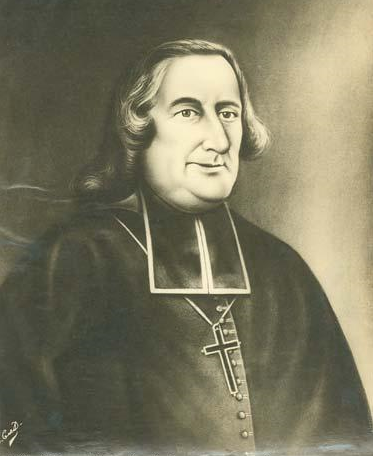
Henri-Marie Dubreuil de Pontbriand

Henri-Marie Dubreuil de Pontbriand (c. January 1708 – 8 June 1760) was a Canadian Catholic prelate who served as Bishop of Quebec.

== Biography ==
Pontbriand was from a titled family and grew up at the Pontbriand Château (now in Ille-et-Vilaine), France.

He received his classical education at La Flèche from the Jesuits and studied theology with the Sulpicians in Paris. He stayed in Paris and was ordained there in 1731 and received a doctorate from the Sorbonne.

Pontbriand spent some time serving the Bishop of Saint-Malo who made him his vicar general. In 1740, at the suggestion of his maternal uncle, the Comte de La Garaye, he was named bishop of Quebec by Louis XV and this appointment was approved by pope Benedict XIV in March 1741.

Before his departure, he spent some months at the Sulpician seminary in Paris learning about his diocese, as the congregation was active in Montreal. He left for Canada that same year on the Rubis, which landed at Quebec 29 Aug. 1741. On the same ship was Jean-Olivier Briand, who served Henri-Marie during his time as bishop and became bishop of Quebec himself in 1766.

Pontbriand commenced his pastoral visits the following January. In 1749 tension developed between the bishop and the Séminaire de Québec over which had the right to appoint a parish priest in Quebec. He undertook the rebuilding of the Ursuline convent in Trois-Rivières which had burned in 1752; and the Hôtel-Dieu de Montréal, which burned in 1755. He was also a slaveowner.

Pontbriand died in 1760.

Religious titles
Preceded by François-Louis de Pourroy de Lauberivière	Bishop of Quebec; 1740–1760	Succeeded by Jean-Olivier Briand
