= Bernard-Claude Panet =

Roman Catholic priest (1753 – 1833)

His Excellency Bernard-Claude Panet
- Archbishop of Quebec
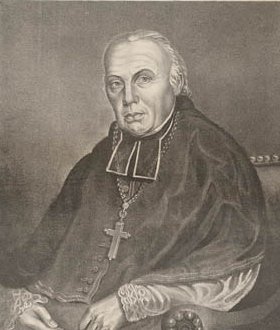
- Archdiocese: Quebec
- Installed: 1825
- Term ended: 1833
- Predecessor: Joseph-Octave Plessis
- Successor: Joseph Signay

Orders
- Ordination: October 25, 1778

Personal details
- Born: January 9, 1753 Quebec City, Canada, New France
- Died: February 14, 1833 (aged 80) Quebec City, Lower Canada
- Coat of arms

Bernard-Claude Panet (French pronunciation: [bɛʁnaʁ klod panɛ]; January 9, 1753 – February 14, 1833) was a Roman Catholic priest and Archbishop of Quebec.

Born in Quebec City, the son of Jean-Claude Panet, he was from a family of 14 children. He had two siblings who gained some fame in Canadian history: Jean-Antoine Panet who became a Lower Canada politician and Jacques Panet who also became a priest.

He was educated at the Petit Séminaire and the Grand Séminaire of Québec. He was ordained a priest in 1778, and began his career as a teacher. One of his noteworthy students was Joseph-Octave Plessis, who actually preceded Panet as archbishop of the Roman Catholic Archdiocese of Quebec.

In 1829, Pope Pius VIII separated Prince Edward Island (PEI), New Brunswick and the Magdalen Islands from the remainder of the Archdiocese of Quebec, establishing a new diocese based in Charlottetown, PEI. Pius commended Panet for his "open and clear" acceptance of the proposed separation.

Religious titles
Preceded by Joseph-Octave Plessis	Archbishop of Quebec; 1825–1833	Succeeded by Joseph Signay
