= Jean-Olivier Briand =

Catholic bishop (1715–1794)

- Bishop of Quebec
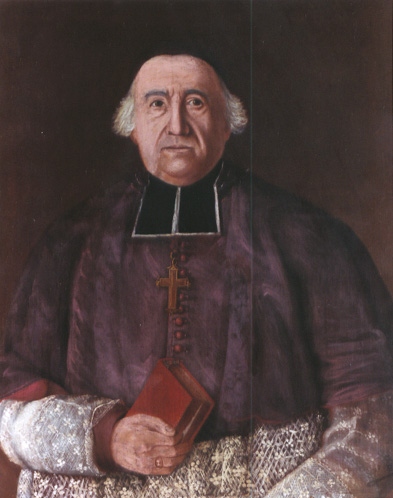
- Archdiocese: Quebec
- Installed: January 21, 1766
- Term ended: November 29, 1784
- Predecessor: Henri-Marie Dubreil de Pontbriand
- Successor: Louis-Philippe Mariauchau d'Esgly

Orders
- Ordination: March 16, 1739

Personal details
- Born: January 23, 1715 Plérin, France
- Died: June 25, 1794 (aged 79) Quebec City

Jean-Olivier Briand (January 23, 1715 – June 25, 1794) was the bishop of the Roman Catholic Diocese of Quebec from 1766 to 1784.

== Life ==
Jean-Olivier Briand was born at Plérin, Brittany on January 23, 1715. He studied at the Seminary of St. Brieuc and was ordained a priest in 1739. In 1741 he left for Canada with another priest, Abbé René-Jean Allenou de Lavillangevin, and the newly appointed bishop for Quebec City, Henri-Marie Dubreil de Pontbriand for whom Briand served as vicar-general. He ministered to the dying at the Battle of Sainte-Foy, and after the bishop's death was appointed administrator of the diocese which then included Acadia, Louisiana, and Illinois.

In the aftermath of the French and Indian War, when many colonists abandoned the country, Briand foresaw that a change of allegiance was inevitable. The Prefect of the Propaganda, Cardinal Castelli advised the Canadian clergy "to forget that they were French". His predecessor, Bishop Pontbriand, reiterated the principle that Christians should accord princes the respect and obedience which is their due (Romans 13:1-7). Briand was able to diplomatically adapt to the new regime and so managed to maintain the rights of the Church without causing a confrontation with the authorities. When the Treaty of Paris was signed in 1763, he ordered a Te Deum for the cessation of the Seven Years' War and praised General Murray for his humanity towards the conquered. Briand was consecrated Bishop of Quebec in Paris on March 16, 1766.

When the Society of Jesus was suppressed in 1773, Briand forwarded a letter from the Holy See to the Jesuits in Pennsylvania and Maryland with a form acknowledging their acceptance of the decree, which they were to sign. However, he did not get involved beyond that, choosing not to engage in ecclesiastical matters outside his jurisdiction, so the priests remained free to manage their ministries and property.

Briand's efforts contributed to the 1774 passage of the Quebec Act. The Act guaranteed free practice of the Catholic faith and removing mention of the Protestant faith from the oath of allegiance. On the other hand, it forbade the bishop from corresponding directly with Rome, and gave governors the right to oversee the appointment of parish priests and the selection of new ordinands. This Act was viewed in the Thirteen Colonies as one of the Intolerable Acts, and colonists decried the countenancing of "popery" in British territory.

== American Revolution ==
Briand did not trust the American colonists, whose antipapal prejudice seemed clear. He was a notable opponent of the American Revolution and served as a useful ally to the British administration under Guy Carleton. In April 1776, the Continental Congress sent Samuel Chase, Benjamin Franklin, and Charles Carroll of Carrollton on a diplomatic mission to Canada, in order to seek assistance from French Canadians against the British. Carroll was an excellent choice for such a mission, being fluent in French and a Roman Catholic, and therefore well suited to negotiations with the French-speaking Catholics of Quebec. He was joined in the commission by his cousin John Carroll.

The commencement of the Invasion of Quebec and the American seizure of Fort Ticonderoga on May 10 prompted Briand, at the request of Governor Carleton, to issue a pastoral letter urging Canadiens to defend their country. It went largely unheeded, as the Canadiens, after so many years of war, while somewhat sympathetic to the Americans, were not interested in fighting for either side.

He notably excommunicated Maryland-born Jesuit priest John Carroll, when the latter tried to encourage Canadians to join the revolution or at least remain neutral. Carroll was apparently somewhat ambiguous about a clergyman being involved in political matters, took opportunity to accompany the ailing Franklin back to Philadelphia.

== Later life ==
Briand, was invited by Cardinal Castelli, the Prefect of the Propaganda, to administer confirmation in Pennsylvania and Maryland, but abandoned the plan upon the recommendation of Father Ferdinand Steinmeyer, S.J. (popularly known as Father Farmer), who drew attention to the Anti-Catholic feeling which was then prevalent in the Colonies.

He resigned in 1784 to make room for a younger bishop. He retained episcopal powers but seldom exercised them during his last years.

== Bibliography ==
- Laurent, Laval. Québec et l'église aux États-Unis sous mgr Briand et mgr Plessis / Laval Laurent; Préf. de S. E. le card. Jean-M.-Rodrigue Villeneuve. Montréal : Librairie St-François, 1945. 258 p. : maps; 24 cm
- Oury, Guy-Marie. Mgr Briand, évêque de Québec, et les problèmes de son époque / Guy Marie Oury; préface de Louis-Albert Vachon. Sablé-sur-Sarthes, France : Éditions de Solesmes; [Sainte-Foy, Québec] : Éditions La Liberté, 1985. 245 p. : ill.; 23 cm. ISBN 2-89084-032-8
- Plessis, Joseph Octave. Oraison funèbre de Mgr Jean-Olivier Briand, ancien évêque de Québec [microform] : prononcée dans la cathédrale de Québec le 27 juin 1794 / par Joseph-Octave Plessis. Lévis [Québec] : Bulletin des recherches historiques, 1906. 1 microfiche (19 images)
- Têtu, Henri, 1849–1915. Les évêques de Quebec [microform] / par Henri Tetu. Nouv. ed. a l'usage de la jeunesse. Tours France : A. Mame; Montréal : Granger, 1983, c1899. 2 microfiches (80 images) : portr. ISBN 0-665-34202-0
- Vachon, André. Mgr Jean-Olivier Briand, 1715-1794 Québec : Éditions des Dix, 1979. 31 p.; 22 cm.
- Vachon, André (1979). "Briand, Jean-Olivier". In Halpenny, Francess G. (ed.). Dictionary of Canadian Biography. Vol. IV (1771–1800) (online ed.). University of Toronto Press.
