= Marie-Rosalie Cadron-Jetté =

Canadian religious sister (1811–1849)

Venerable Marie-Rosalie Cadron-Jetté SM
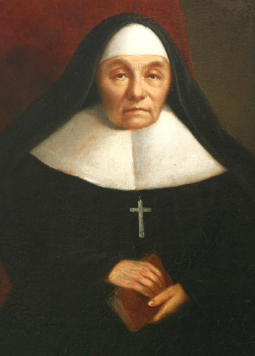
- Detail from a portrait of Mother Marie of the Nativity c. 1860
- Born: January 27, 1794; Lavaltrie, Lower Canada, British Empire
- Died: April 5, 1864 (aged 70); Montreal, Province of Canada, British Empire

Marie-Rosalie Cadron-Jetté SM (January 27, 1794 – April 5, 1864), religious name Marie of the Nativity, was a Canadian widow and midwife who undertook the charitable care of unwed and struggling mothers between 1840 and 1864. Out of this work, she became the foundress of the Congregation of the Sisters of Misericorde. The cause for her beatification was opened in 1989. Pope Francis declared her as venerable in 2013

Cadron-Jetté was born and raised in Lavaltrie, Quebec, and in 1811 married Jean-Marie Jetté. They had 11 children, several of whom died young. In 1827, she moved to Montreal and in 1832 her husband died of cholera. From 1840, in collaboration with Ignace Bourget (then Bishop of the Roman Catholic Diocese of Montreal), she engaged in the charitable care of unwed mothers. At this time in Montreal, unwed mothers and those associating with them attracted a significant social stigma. Cadron-Jetté operated initially out of her own home and the homes of her children, and later, with the aid of other women, worked from a series of buildings known as the Hospice de Sainte-Pélagie. In 1848, she took religious vows, along with several other women, and founded a Roman Catholic religious institute known as the Sisters of Misericorde, dedicated to the care of unwed mothers and their children. In 1849 she obtained formal midwifery qualifications. In 1853, the Misericorde Sisters built a convent on the corner of Dorchester Boulevard and Saint-André Street, and she lived there the remainder of her life.

Cadron-Jetté died in 1864. After her death, Ignace Bourget, with whom she had worked closely throughout her life, proposed that Cadron-Jetté be considered for beatfication.

== Early life ==
Rosalie Cadron was born in Lavaltrie, Quebec, on January 27, 1794, the older of two daughters. Her father was Antoine Cadron, a farmer, and her mother Rosalie Roy, a midwife. Her sister was Sophie Cadron (born March 21, 1806). Her family was Roman Catholic and shortly after birth she was baptized by the Abbé Louis Lamotte. She lived at a family home on the Rue Notre-Dame in Lavaltrie until 1822.

Cadron undertook brief education while boarding at a convent located in Pointe-aux-Trembles in east Montreal, but returned home due to loneliness after only a few weeks. She did not learn to read until later in life, and appears to have never learned to write. After returning from the convent, she was educated at home in housekeeping, sewing and crafts. In 1806 Cadron took First Communion.

At the age of 16 or 17, Cadron met voyageur Jean-Marie Jetté, a brother of her uncle by marriage, Paul Jetté, whose father was a blacksmith, possibly while at a family gathering; they married October 7, 1811, at the Church of Lavaltrie. Rosalie Cadron took her husband's name and was known as Rosalie Cadron-Jetté. Jean-Marie moved into Cadron-Jetté's parents' house with her, as was the custom, and undertook a new career as a farmer. In 1811, that house, along with the surrounding land and outbuildings, was given to Cadron-Jetté and Jean-Marie by Cadron-Jetté's parents, on the condition that the parents be allowed to live there until their death, and that Cadron-Jetté and Jean-Marie assume the care of Cadron-Jetté's sister Sophie until her age of majority.

Between 1812 and 1832 Cadron-Jetté and Jean-Marie had 11 children, five of whom died young (four prior to Jean-Marie's death, and one afterwards, in 1836). The children were Jean-Marie Junior (born 1812), Marie-Rose (1813), Pierre (1815), Francois (1817), Léocadie (1819), Joseph-Léonard (born 1819), an anonymous stillbirth (1823), Marie Edwige (1825), Antoine (1827), Hedwige (1830), and Marie Hedwige (1832).

In 1822, seeking more land in order to provide for their children's inheritance, the Jetté family sold their farm under a staggered payment arrangement whereby they would not have the full payment for three years. While waiting for the payments to come through, the Jettés lived in Vercheres, either in rented property or residing with relatives. Cadron-Jetté, Jean-Marie and their children were accompanied in the move by Rosalie's parents and Rosalie's sister Sophie. In 1823 they moved again to Saint Hyacinthe and in 1824 they bought land there from a Charles Jarret. However, they later discovered the seller did not own the relevant land, leading in late 1826 or early 1827 to the repossession of the majority of the Jetté family's property. Following this setback the family moved to Montreal, took residence in the borough of Saint-Laurent, and joined the congregation of Saint-Jacques Cathedral.

== Widowhood ==
On June 14, 1832, Cadron-Jetté's husband Jean-Marie died of cholera, one of many victims of that year's cholera epidemic, leaving Cadron-Jetté widowed. Cadron-Jetté responded to her husband's death by vowing to be in mourning, or wear black, for the remainder of her life. At that time, Cadron-Jetté's eldest two sons, Jean-Marie and Pierre (20 and 17 years old, respectively), were employed as shoemakers, and the eldest daughter, Rose (19) was engaged (and was married in July 1833), while Cadron-Jetté's other four surviving children still required Cadron-Jetté's care, as did Cadron-Jetté's elderly mother. It was not until 1838, following the death of Cadron-Jetté's mother and the maturity or death of her remaining children, that she found herself with time free to devote to charitable activities.

== Hospice de Sainte-Pélagie ==
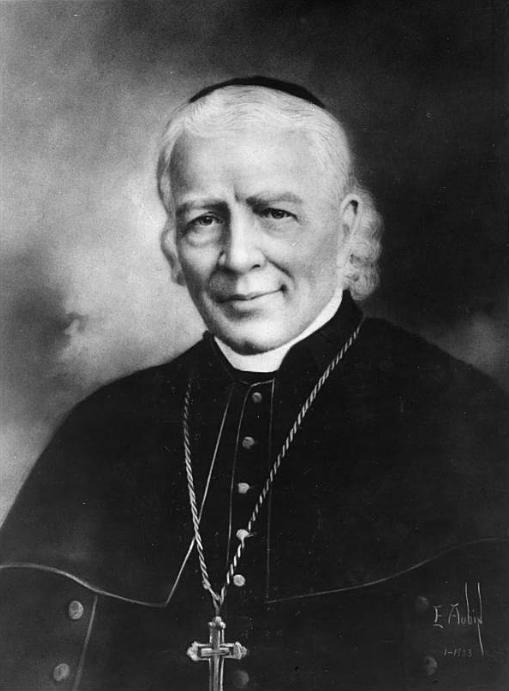
Bishop Ignace Bourget (1799 -1885), spiritual director of Rosalie Cadron-Jetté and the Hospice de Sainte-Pélagie.

Several sources describe an incident which purportedly had an influence on Cadron-Jetté's future career. Between 1830 and 1832, while living in Montreal, Cadron-Jetté was visited at her house in the middle of the night by a prostitute who was seeking asylum from two sailors with intentions of violence. Cadron-Jetté hid the woman for the night in her cellar, fed her, and counselled her to change her way of life. Subsequently Cadron-Jetté received a letter from the woman informing her the woman had emigrated to the United States and made positive changes to her life, including marriage.

In any case, during her time in Montreal, Cadron-Jetté made the acquaintance of Ignace Bourget, Bishop of the Diocese of Montreal. She met Bourget through her attendance at Saint Jacques Cathedral, where he became her spiritual director. Cadron-Jetté joined his Archiconfrérie du Très Saint et Immaculé Coeur de Marie, a group formed by Bourget to pray for the conversion of sinners. Beginning in 1840, Bourget began to call upon Cadron-Jetté to find crisis accommodation for unwed mothers who had approached him for confession and help. This accommodation was to be secret, as unwed mothers carried a significant social stigma at the time and were often the targets of hostility, and it was to be "with a kind and prayerful woman". Cadron-Jetté undertook this work, and between 1840 and 1845 helped around 25 women during their pregnancy, childbirth, and recovery. She would often place the women with her (now-independent) children, and sometimes offered the women accommodation in her own home. After the birth of each child, Cadron-Jetté would take the newborn to be baptised at Montreal's Notre Dame church, and stand as godmother for the child.

In 1845, in response to growing demand brought about by Montreal's burgeoning population, Bourget began an organised project to assist unwed mothers in need of crisis accommodation and medical care. Although the Grey Nuns had been doing work in this area since 1754, their efforts were limited to the care of illegitimate newborns, and no services existed to aid the unwed mothers themselves. In addition, the work of the Grey Nuns did not address the rate of abortions and infanticides among unwed mothers, which was of concern to Bourget due to Roman Catholic Church prohibitions on these activities. Therefore, rather than partnering with an existing religious community for this project, Bourget hoped to create a new one "free of traditions or previous hampering ties", and asked Rosalie Cadron-Jetté to take a leading role. Cadron-Jetté agreed, and on May 1, 1845, she founded the Hospice Sainte-Pélagie (also known as the Maternité de Sainte-Pélagie), operating out of the attic of a house on Saint-Simon Street, Montreal, which her son Pierre had leased from a widow named Aurelie Vinét. The hospice derived its name from Saint Pelagia, a 5th-century reformed courtesan who chose to martyr herself rather than be raped by soldiers, to whom the Hospice was blessed and dedicated by Bishop Bourget shortly after its inception.

Early on, conditions in the hospice were rudimentary, consisting only of a table, some chairs, a stove, and a few beds for the mothers (called "penitents"), with Cadron-Jetté herself sleeping on the floor. The attic could only be reached by a ladder on the exterior of the house and was not insulated. For this reason, Cadron-Jetté's new occupation was unpopular with her (now mature) children, who objected to the conditions of dire poverty in the Hospice and attempted to dissuade her from her new calling, on one occasion going so far as to begin moving her belongings out of the Hospice. Despite this, Cadron-Jetté persevered, expanding the Hospice's operations to provide accommodation for up to seven or eight women at a time, and, from July 1845, taking on an additional caregiver. This caregiver was Sophie Raymond née Desmarets, herself a widow, who in addition to helping with the mothers, undertook fundraising activities on behalf of the hospice. Through the combined efforts of Raymond and Bourget, the Hospice attracted the attentions of Antoine-Olivier Berthelet, a wealthy philanthropist, who provided money, food and firewood, and later contributed to the building of facilities for the Misericordia Sisters on Dorchester Boulevard.

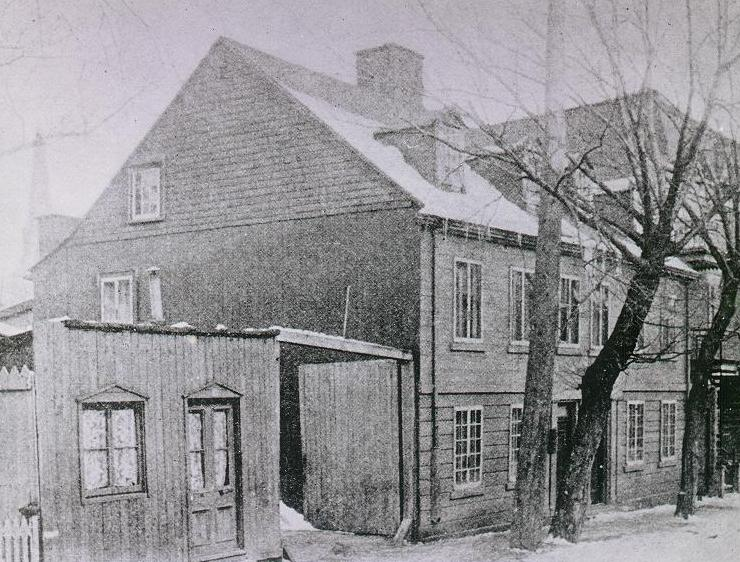
The house on Wolfe Street occupied by the Hospice de Sainte-Pélagie from May 1846 to April 1847

On May 4, 1846, the hospice moved to an address on Wolfe Street in Faubourg Quebec owned by Jean-Baptiste Bourgault. The new premises consisted of two storeys plus an attic, with the Hospice occupying one side of the house and the owner occupying the other. The expanded space provided room for a small chapel featuring Stations of the Cross, where Mass was held twice weekly. It also allowed for the addition of three extra staff at the Hospice, including a Mrs Montrait, a midwife. During the Hospice's second year of operation it was host to 33 pregnant women and saw the birth of 25 infants.

On July 26, 1846, Bishop Bourget unilaterally opened the noviciate of the Saint-Pélagie Community, and placed the assembled female staff of the Hospice as novices within that program. This effectively established the Hospice de Saint-Pélagie as a religious community, of which Bourget proclaimed Sophie Raymond to be the superior. It also allowed for women to join the community as postulants, with the aim of eventually taking religious vows. Bourget designated himself spiritual and canonical director of the novitiate, and delegated a priest, the Abbé Antoine Rey, to be Director of the Hospice. Later that year at the direction of Coadjutor Bishop Jean-Charles Prince (later Bishop of Saint-Hyacinth) the Wolfe Street premises were expanded through the acquisition of the first floor adjacent to the hospice.

On September 17, 1846, Josephite Malo-Galipeau joined the community, bringing with her a large endowment of funds left to her by her late husband, which substantially enriched the community. Despite these additional funds the women of the Hospice were still forced to do odd jobs outside the hospice to make ends meet. Cadron-Jetté during this time undertook occasional work as a shoemaker. Elections were held within the community on November 6, 1846, with the result of Cadron-Jetté being appointed as the new superior for a period of one year, with Malo-Galipeau named as her assistant. From December 1, 1846, the women of the community began wearing a religious habit at the direction of Bishop Prince.

In early 1847, Jean-Baptiste Bourgault, owner of the Wolfe Street premises, notified Cadron-Jetté and the Hospice that he was evicting them, citing concern for his reputation. After exhaustive enquiries, a new premises was located on the corner of Sainte-Catherine and Saint-André streets, provided by John Donegani, a Montreal businessman, at a rent of 60 dollars a year. On April 26, 1847, the Hospice moved to the new site.

A typhus epidemic swept Montreal in late 1847 and Montreal's religious communities, including Cadron-Jetté and the staff of the hospice, were called upon by Bishop Bourget to assist in combating it. The hospice's chaplain and director, Antoine Rey, and its midwife, Madame Montrait, were among the nine priests and 13 Religious Sisters of Montreal who were killed by the disease. One of the hospice's penitents also died due to the disease. Bishop Bourget subsequently named Father Venant Pilon as Rey's replacement as Director of the Hospice.

== Sisters of Misericorde ==
On January 16, 1848, at the age of 53, Cadron-Jetté took religious vows, along with seven other women who had worked with her at the Hospice. Those in attendance as observers at the profession ceremony included Bishop Ignace Bourget, and Émilie Gamelin, under whose leadership the Sisters of Providence had been founded five years previously. Along with her vows Cadron-Jetté took the religious name Soeur de la Nativité (Sister Nativity), a reference to the role of the Virgin Mary in the birthing of Christ. Together, the eight women of the Hospice formed the Institute of the Misericordia Sisters.

Bourget petitioned the Church of Montreal to recognise the Institute and that recognition was granted. The institute received the ecclesiastical mandate to "live the mercy of Jesus the Saviour with girls and women in a situation of maternity out of wedlock and their children, and with the mothers of families who are having a difficult time with their maternity". The Institute was the first religious community in Canada to receive such a mission. The vows of the Misericordia Sisters were the traditional vows of poverty, chastity and obedience, together with a fourth vow, being that of "assisting in their labour fallen girls and women", with a consequence to "form a corps of midwives".

On January 17, 1848, elections were held to determine leadership of the new community, and at the first election Josephite Malo-Galipeau (now Sister Sainte-Jeanne-de-Chantal) was appointed mother superior, and Cadron-Jetté made councillor, with responsibility for the infirmary. This position left Cadron-Jetté free to undertake care for the ill and disadvantaged, including home visits and visits to prisons. Sources, including Grégoire's 2007 book Rosalie Cadron-Jetté. A Story of Courage and Compassion, suggest Cadron-Jetté may have been offered the position of mother superior, but declined it.

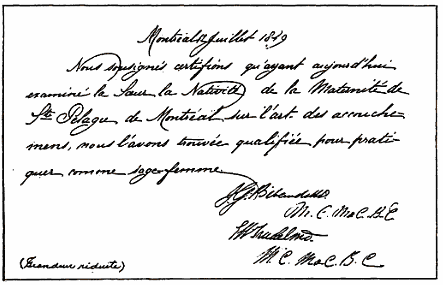
Midwifery certificate of Rosalie Cadron-Jetté, issued 1849.

Beginning January 17, 1848, the eight founders of the Misericorde Sisters, including Cadron-Jetté, commenced practical training in midwifery under Dr Eugène-Hercule Trudele, a young obstetrician. The objective of the training was to better prepare the sisters to meet the obligations of their fourth vow. The training lasted for 18 months and concluded with an examination before two members of the College of Physicians and Surgeons of Lower Canada, with the result that on July 12, 1849, the women received formal certificates of midwifery. It is most likely during this period or the years immediately following that Cadron-Jetté learned to read and write.

In 1849 Malo-Galipeau was again elected Mother Superior with Cadron-Jetté being given the position of assistant. Around this time the relationship between the two women became strained. Despite the election result Malo-Galipeau did not bestow formal titles on Cadron-Jetté and is recorded as referring to Cadron-Jetté disrespectfully as "Nativity" (a short form of her religious name) and on at least one occasion "fool". Malo-Galipeau on several occasions during this period reprimanded Cadron-Jetté for decisions Cadron-Jetté had made in discharge of her formal responsibilities, and imposed punishments, including barring Cadron-Jetté from communion. The 1849 election was the last election to be held by the community until late 1858.

The Misericorde Sisters were not well liked by the Montreal community. Throughout the early years of the Hospice de Sainte-Pélagie and the Institute, the locations in which Jetté and the Sisters worked were kept secret, in order to protect the single mothers from public hostility towards prostitutes and unwed mothers. On some occasions when the Sisters brought newborns to church for baptism, garbage was thrown at them. People in prayer were reported to leave when the Sisters would enter the church.

The Sisters faced controversy not only from public opinion, but also within the medical profession. Initially the response of Montreal doctors was positive, and in 1850 the College of Physicians petitioned Bishop Bourget for permission to send students to the Hospice de Sainte-Pélagie for training, which Bourget granted over the objections of the Sisters. However, friction arose between the Sisters and the students; the Sisters did not want the students present (a position shared by many of the unwed mothers), while the students were often contemptuous, rude, or dismissive towards their patients. Combined with the competency of the Misericorde Sisters, and their non-profit mandate, this friction bloomed into hostility between the Sisters and Montreal physicians, who came to see the midwives as a professional threat.

On May 13, 1851, Antoine-Olivier Berthelet purchased land on the corner of Dorchester Boulevard and Saint-André Street (in Montreal) for use by the Misericorde Sisters, and in December 1851, following renovations to the two pre-existing structures on the land, the Sisters moved to the new address. In 1853 work began on a Mother House (or convent) for the Institute. The Motherhouse was planned to be a multistory building, built of grey stone, financed by borrowed money. Plans for the motherhouse had been drawn up in 1852 but the Montreal fires of July 8, 1852, which destroyed around 11,000 homes along with the Saint-Jacques Cathedral, had the result of delaying construction projects throughout the city.

In 1853, Bourget met with the Sisters and questioned whether their fourth vow (that of assisting in labour) should be abandoned, with the consequence of the medical work of midwifery being done by physicians and lay midwives. Bourget's concerns stemmed both from pressure and criticism from the Montreal medical community, and from a desire to expand the membership of the Sisters, as he feared potential candidates would be deterred by the necessity of learning and practicing the craft of midwifery. Cadron-Jetté took the firm position that the vow should be retained, citing the general contempt held by physicians for the Sisters and their patients, the incompetence of the student doctors who were the Sisters' primary competition, and the expressed preference of her patients to deal with the Sisters rather than doctors. Bourget retreated in the face of Cadron-Jetté's opposition and the matter was not raised again for some years.

In 1856 the City of Montreal donated a building located across the street from the convent for the use of the Misericordia Sisters. Called "Corporation House" it was put to use as a residence for the single mothers cared for by the Institute, with the mothers being charged rent by the Sisters while they stayed there. In late 1858 new elections were held by the Sisters, with Malo-Galipeau reappointed as mother superior and Cadron-Jetté given the position of Councillor. Around this time of these elections Bishop Bourget also gave the Sisters permission to baptise children at the Hospice, rather than take them to Notre Dame Cathedral for baptism, which was significant as by 1858 the Sisters were supervising around 137 births per year, each requiring a trip to the Cathedral for baptism.

By 1858, Malo-Galipeau had become widely recognised as foundress of the Misericordia Sisters, partly due to her role as Mother Superior and partly due to the endowment she had brought to the community upon her arrival. This understanding was reflected in published works of the time, including a souvenir album prepared by the City of Montreal in 1853. However, during Bourget's visit to the Institute in late 1858, he made a speech to the assembled community confirming that in the eyes of himself and of the Church, Cadron-Jetté should receive credit as the foundress of the congregation. He also bestowed upon Cadron-Jetté the title of Mother (such that her religious name became Mother Mary of the Nativity, or Mère de la Nativité) and confirmed that she was second in authority only to the current Mother Superior of the community.

For some years, beginning prior to 1853, the Institute had been taking in what were called "madeleines" or "magdalens", and in 1859 this practice was formally recognised with the Magdalens made a secondary order of the Misericordia Sisters. The practice of taking in Magdalens followed a tradition originating in Europe, where religious orders would take in "repentants" or "penitents" and place them under the protection of Mary Magdalene, a famous reformed sinner of Roman Catholic tradition, and from whom they took the name. In the case of the Misericordia Sisters, Magdalens were recruited from those unwed mothers who did not wish to leave the care of the sisters even after recovering from giving birth. They were allowed to take religious vows and live within the Misericordia Sisters community, obeying particular rules of dedication to contemplation. During the time the program lasted, about 1% to 1.5% of mothers helped by the Institute stayed on as Magdalens.

== Later life and death ==
By 1859, Rosalie Cadron-Jetté's health was worsening significantly. Information about the particular conditions she was afflicted with is contradictory. Testimony from Cadron-Jetté's family suggests that Cadron-Jetté had become ill when she was 36 years old and never fully recovered. Other sources suggest generalised edema, known at the time as dropsy, while still others diagnose her with chronic nephritis, known at the time as Bright's disease, which worsened over the following years. Symptoms observed in Cadron-Jetté by her contemporaries included difficulty breathing, almost constant coughing, fits of breathlessness while standing and at rest, and swollen legs displaying open sores.

In any case, from around 1859, due to declining health, Cadron-Jetté ceased her work as a midwife, and from 1862 stopped making house visits to care for the ill. As the convent did not yet have an infirmary, she spent most of her days during this time in the convent's dormitory, until 1861, when at Bishop Bourget's request a private room was prepared for Cadron-Jetté by Malo-Galipeau. In 1863, Cadron-Jetté, by then bedridden, was moved to a room adjoining the convent's newly constructed chapel.

Advised of her failing health, Bishop Ignace Bourget visited Cadron-Jetté on April 4, 1864, and administered to her the last rites. Rosalie Cadron-Jetté died shortly thereafter, during the early hours of April 5. Her death was witnessed by Sister Marie-des-Saints-Anges, who said this of the occasion: "I witnessed her blessed death. I was sitting vigil with our good sister Sainte-Béatrix. Around 2 a.m. she made the sign of the cross and asked us to recite the Litanies of the Virgin Mary; then she arranged herself as if to prepare for sleep, then in a high pitched voice she said: O my Jesus! Then I noticed she was getting weaker; we brought the light closer to her and realized she had already passed over to a better life."

Several unexplained incidents are associated with Cadron-Jetté's death. According to Hélène Grégoire's 2007 book Rosalie Cadron-Jetté. A Story of Courage and Compassion, at the moment of Cadron-Jetté's death an "unknown, elderly sister" holding a lantern was observed by women in the Magdalens' dormitory. The "elderly sister" is recorded as addressing one of the Magdalens who was ill and telling her that "if she is very brave and prays with confidence, she will be healed". The unknown sister then left the dormitory. Grégoire also claims that the other Sisters were mysteriously awakened during the night of Cadron-Jetté's death, and that following Cadron-Jetté's death the wounds on Cadron-Jetté's legs were observed to be inexplicably healed over.

A funeral was held for Cadron-Jetté on April 8, 1864, at the chapel of the Misericordia Sisters, with Bishop Bourget and several dignitaries of the Church of Montreal in attendance. At the time of her death, the Institute of Misericordia Sisters comprised 33 professed religious, 11 novices and postulants, and 25 magdalens and other women.

== Cause for canonization ==
In 1879, Ignace Bourget suggested to Sister St-Thérèse de Jésus (then mother superior of the Misericordia Sisters) that she gather testimonials from Cadron-Jetté's contemporaries for use in a possible future canonization cause. In 1881, in a letter to the Misericordia community, he said, "Your Mother of the Nativity must be canonized; you must have enough faith and confidence in her protection to obtain miracles from her, then the Church will make a formal declaration."

In 1989, Cardinal Paul Grégoire (then Archbishop of Montréal), signed a decree opening a canonical inquiry into Rosalie Cadron-Jetté, beginning a process within the Roman Catholic Church which as of 2011 is still ongoing and which may eventually result in the elevation of Cadron-Jetté to sainthood. The process is overseen by the Congregation for the Causes of Saints (the CCS) in Rome. On November 6, 1990, the Diocesan Tribunal tasked with investigation of Cadron-Jetté's cause was officially opened, granting to Cadron-Jetté the title of "Servant of God", the first of four steps which may culminate in canonization. An inquiry was then made into whether Cadron-Jetté was the object of any public cult. Diocesan Acts of the Trial were drawn up for scrutiny by the under-secretary of the CCS, and on January 29, 1993, a decree was signed sanctioning those Acts by Jean-Claude Turcotte, Archbishop of Montréal, and read by Michel Parent, chancellor of the Montréal diocese.

Following the decree, a positio was drafted in Montréal by Sister Gisèle Boucher for presentation in Rome, presenting the evidence collected during the diocesan enquiry and creating a foundation for further enquiry into the elevation of Cadron-Jetté. The 856-page positio was tabled at the CSS on July 1, 1994. In 2011, the positio was presented to a committee of expert theologians. On December 9, 2013, Pope Francis titled her as venerable.

== Legacy ==
A number of buildings throughout North America are named after Rosalie Cadron-Jetté, including:

- Rosalie Manor in Milwaukee, established by the Misericordia Sisters in 1908.
- Rosalie Hall in Toronto, a young parent resource centre.
- Rosalie Hall in the Bronx, New York, a care and comfort centre for pregnant and parenting teens, originally part of the former Misericordia Hospital founded by the Sisters.
- Villa Rosa in Winnipeg, a care centre for mothers and babies.

Rosalie Cadron-Jetté's childhood home in Lavaltrie is today known as the Maison Rosalie-Cadron and since 2006 has been open to the public between the months of May and October.
