= Ignace Bourget =

Canadian Roman Catholic priest

His Grace, The Right Reverend Ignace Bourget
- Bishop of Montreal
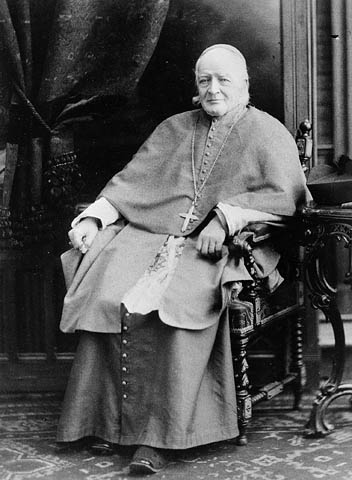
- Bourget in 1882
- Province: Quebec
- Diocese: Montreal
- See: Montreal
- Installed: April 23, 1840
- Term ended: May 11, 1876
- Predecessor: Jean-Jacques Lartigue
- Successor: Edouard Charles Fabre
- Other posts: Coadjutor Bishop of Montreal; Titular Bishop of Telmesse; Titular Archbishop of Marcianopolis

Orders
- Ordination: November 30, 1822
- Consecration: July 25, 1837 by Jean-Jacques Lartigue

Personal details
- Born: October 30, 1799 Lévis, Province of Lower Canada, British Empire
- Died: June 8, 1885 (aged 85) Sault-au-Récollet, Montreal, Quebec, Canada
- Buried: Mary, Queen of the World Cathedral.
- Denomination: Roman Catholic
- Parents: Pierre Bourget & Thérèse Paradis
- Education: Grand Séminaire de Québec

Ignace Bourget (French pronunciation: [iɲas buʁʒɛ]; October 30, 1799 – June 8, 1885) was a Canadian Catholic prelate who served as Bishop of Montreal from 1840 to 1876.

Born in Lévis, Quebec, in 1799, Bourget entered the clergy at an early age, undertook several courses of religious study, and in 1837 was named coadjutor bishop of the newly created Diocese of Montreal. Following the death of Jean-Jacques Lartigue in 1840, Bourget became Bishop of Montreal.

During the 1840s, Bourget led the expansion of the Catholic Church in Quebec. He encouraged the immigration of European missionary societies, including the Oblates of Mary Immaculate, the Jesuits, the Society of the Sacred Heart and the Good Shepherd Sisters. He also established entirely new religious communities including the Sisters of the Holy Names of Jesus and Mary, Sisters of Saint Anne, Sisters of Providence, and the Institute of Misericordia Sisters. He commissioned the construction of St James Cathedral, known today as Mary, Queen of the World Cathedral, and played a key role in the establishment of the Université Laval and the Hospice of the Holy Child Jesus.

Bourget was a fierce ultramontanist, supporting the supreme authority of the pope in matters both secular and spiritual. He frequently clashed with the Canadian secular authorities, most notably through his attacks on the anti-clericist Institut Canadien de Montréal, his defence of parochial schooling in New Brunswick, and his refusal to grant a Catholic burial to Joseph Guibord. In 1876, facing an inquiry by the Vatican into his increasing involvement in secular politics, Bourget resigned as Bishop of Montreal and retired to Sault-au-Récollet, where he continued to take an active role in church life until his death in 1885.

== Early life ==
Bourget was born in the parish of St Joseph in Lévis, Quebec, on October 30, 1799. He was the eleventh child of thirteen born to Piere Bourget, a farmer, and Therese Paradis. He received elementary schooling at home and at the Point Lévis school, and then went on to study at the Petit Séminaire de Québec, and at the Grand Séminaire de Québec.

In 1812, Bourget was admitted to the Congrégation de la Sainte-Vierge. On August 11, 1818, he was tonsured in the cathedral at Quebec City and from September 1818 commenced three years of study at the Séminaire de Nicolet, where he studied theology, and also taught first year classes in Latin elements and second year classes in syntax. On January 28, 1821, he was conferred minor orders by Joseph-Octave Plessis, Archbishop of Quebec, and on May 20 of that year at the parish church of Nicolet he was elevated to the position of subdeacon. On May 21, 1821, Bourget left Nicolet to assume the post of secretary to Jean-Jacques Lartigue, vicar general of Montreal. On December 22, 1821, he was made a deacon at the bishop's residence in the Hôtel-Dieu.

On November 30, 1822, Bourget was ordained to the priesthood by Lartigue and shortly thereafter was given supervision of the construction of Saint-Jacques Cathedral, the erection of which had only begun that year. The cathedral was completed on September 22, 1825, and consecrated by Plessis, and Bourget was named chaplain. This role gave him responsibility for organising the pastoral ministry of St-Jacques and seeing to the conduct of public worship.

On September 8, 1836, Montreal was made a bishopric, with Lartigue becoming Bishop of Montreal. This led to clashes with the Society of Saint-Sulpice, known as the Sulpicians, who exercised dominion over Montreal Island as seigneurs and pastors of the parish of Notre-Dame and who did not recognise Lartigue's episcopal authority over them. This frustrated Lartigue, who followed the doctrine of ultramontanism, which asserted the supreme authority of the Pope over local temporal and spiritual hierarchies. Bourget shared this viewpoint with Lartigue, which led Lartigue to make a submission to Pope Gregory XVI appointing Bourget as his successor to the episcopal see. Despite objections from the Sulpicians, who asserted Bourget was too inexperienced and too concerned with the minutiae of process and discipline, the submission was accepted by the Pope, and on March 10, 1837, Bourget was appointed bishop of the titular see of Telmesse (an honorary rather than substantive position) and coadjutor to the bishop of Montreal with right of succession. He was consecrated bishop on July 25, 1837, in St-Jacques Cathedral.

The newly created diocese of Montreal consisted of 79 parishes, 34 missions at widely dispersed points, particularly in the Eastern Townships, and four missions to the Indians. It included 186,244 adherents of whom 115,071 were communicants. The town of Montreal itself contained 22,000 Catholics, being approximately two thirds of the town's population. In June/July 1838 and in May–July 1939, Bourget toured the bishopric, visiting around 30 parishes.

1837 and 1838 saw the Lower Canada Rebellion, in which both Lartigue and Bourget made public statements opposing the rebels, and in particular condemning Louis-Joseph Papineau, who was a supporter of secular schools in preference to religious schools. Lartigue called on all Catholics to reject the reform movement and support the authorities.

== Bishop of Montreal, and church expansion ==
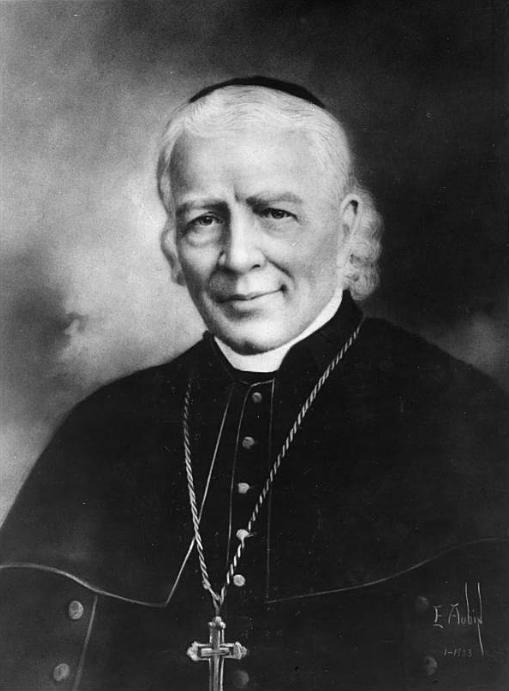
Ignace Bourget, circa 1840

On April 19, 1840, Jean-Jacques Lartigue died, and by right of succession on April 23, 1840, Ignace Bourget became Bishop of Montreal, a position which he held until 1876.

As bishop, Bourget continued to tour the outlying parishes, including in late 1840 a visit to the north shore of the Ottawa River, where Bourget established eight new missions, creating the foundations for what would eventually become the diocese of Bytown. In November 1840, Bourget moved the training of ecclesiastics from the Grand Séminaire Saint-Jacques to the Petit Séminaire de Montréal, where it would be handled by the Sulpicians. In the same year, he directed four Grey Nuns in the creation of the Sisters of Charity of Saint-Hyacinthe, an offshoot of the Hôpital Général de Montreal, with the result of a new hospital servicing the Saint-Hyacinthe area. In December 1840 Bourget was instrumental in the establishment of the Mélanges religieux, a religious journal intended to be free of politics.

From May 3 to September 23, 1841, Bourget visited Europe, where he sought new priests to staff the schools, missions and parishes occasioned by Canada's burgeoning population. He also raised the issue of the creation of an ecclesiastical province to unify the administration of Canada's dioceses. He concluded his visit to Europe by visiting France, where he observed and was impressed by the religious revival taking place in that country. On June 23, 1841, the Paris newspaper L’Univers stated that Bourget had "come to Europe to seek a reinforcement of workers for the gospel", and indeed his visit was interpreted as an open invitation to apostolic missionaries to bring their missions to Montreal.

The invitation was accepted and the next several years saw an influx of religious congregations into Montreal, including missions from the Oblates of Mary Immaculate (arriving December 2, 1841), the Jesuits (arriving May 31, 1842), the Society of the Sacred Heart (arriving December 26, 1842) and the Good Shepherd Sisters (arriving June 7, 1844). When other religious communities, such as the Filles de la Charité de Saint-Vincent-de-Paul, cancelled their plans to send missions to Montreal, Bourget instead organised the foundation of new Montreal-based religious communities, including in 1843 the Sisters of Providence under the leadership of Émilie Gamelin, and the Sisters of the Holy Names of Jesus and Mary under Eulalie Durocher.

On June 12, 1844, the ecclesiastical province of Quebec was erected by papal bull, and on November 24, 1844, Bourget presided over the ceremonial conferring of the pallium on the metropolitan bishop, Archbishop Joseph Signay, at the cathedral at Quebec. During 1844 Bourget suggested to Signay that Signay should call a first provincial council to establish the authority of the archbishop and demonstrate that the title was not merely honorific. Signay took the suggestion as an insult, which soured his relationship with Bourget.

Bourget was instrumental in several important developments in the city of Kingston, Ontario, at that time newly named as capital of the Province of Canada. He invited the Congregation of Notre-Dame to set up a primary school in Kingston, and in September 1845 arranged for the creation of a hospital staffed by Religious Hospitallers of St Joseph from the Hôtel-Dieu at Montreal which serviced the town and surrounding district.

On May 1, 1845, Bourget directed Rosalie Cadron-Jetté, a widow of his St-Jacques congregation, in the establishment of the Hospice de Sainte-Pélagie, a Montreal-based institute providing care and crisis accommodation for unwed mothers, and on January 16, 1848, he arranged for Cadron-Jetté and her helpers to take nuns' vows and found the Institute of Misericordia Sisters, a religious community dedicated to "girls and women in a situation of maternity out of wedlock and their children".

On August 30, 1850, Bourget founded the Hospice du Saint-Enfant-Jesus (Hospice of the Holy Child Jesus), an institute for the care of deaf-mutes, which was managed first by Charles-Irénée Lagorce, and later by the Clerics of St Viator. The same year, Bourget was instrumental in the foundation of the Sisters of Saint Ann. In 1853 Bourget founded the Annales de la tempérance, a society dedicated to the goal of temperance.

== Church consolidation ==
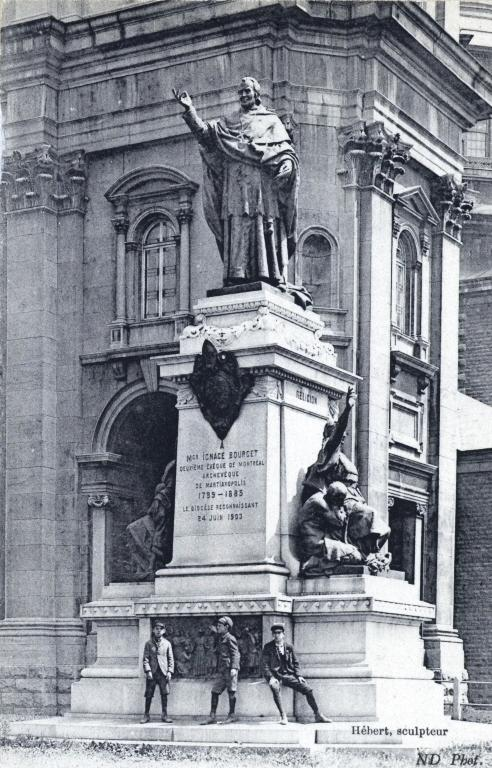
Statue of Ignace Bourget sculpted by Louis-Philippe Hébert, located outside Mary, Queen of the World Cathedral

By 1846 Bourget found that many of his plans for expansion and renovation of the Roman Catholic Church in Canada were being frustrated by Archbishop Signay, who disliked Bourget and was distrustful of Bourget's changes. On September 25, 1846, Bourget wrote to Signay and said, "For a long time I have been thinking that Your Grace should give up the administration of your archdiocese, contenting yourself with retaining the title of metropolitan. I shall use the occasion of my journey to Rome to put before the Holy See the reasons leading me to believe that it might be time for you to relieve yourself of this burden." With this in mind, Bourget travelled to Rome in late 1846 to petition the Pope for Signay's resignation. He was supported in this cause by Charles-Félix Cazeau, secretary to Signay.

In Rome, Bourget found a Vatican newly rejuvenated, Pope Pius IX having recently succeeded the unpopular Pope Gregory XVI. Bourget was unsuccessful in securing Signay's discharge, but nevertheless enjoyed several other successes, including the establishment of the diocese of Bytown with Bourget's preferred candidate, Joseph-Bruno Guigues, made bishop. He also secured an additional 20 religious staff for Montreal, including representatives of the Congregation of Holy Cross, the Clerics of Saint Viator, the Jesuits, and the Sisters of the Society of the Sacred Heart of Jesus.

In 1847 a typhus epidemic occurred in Montreal, with the arrival of Irish refugees from the Great Famine. Bourget worked directly with its victims along with many of the staff of his diocese. Nine priests and thirteen religious sisters died of the disease while treating the refugees. Bourget also caught the diseases, but survived. At around this time, Bourget was reported as taking no more than five hours' sleep a day, and produced a substantial body of written works including pastoral correspondence and manuscript works. He was also reported to be an enthusiastic conversationalist. His hair had prematurely whitened.

On April 5, 1848, the Institut Canadien de Montréal founded the Association des établissements canadiens des townships, and Bourget was made chair of the central committee. The vice-chair was Louis-Joseph Papineau, a noted anti-clericist whom Bourget had publicly condemned during the 1837 rebellions, and in September 1848 Bourget found himself unable to work productively with the committee and resigned.

Under Bourget, the Roman Catholic Church in Montreal began to place a greater importance on ceremony and ritual. Bourget favoured Roman-style ceremonies over the more sedate masses of the Sulpicians, brought back holy relics from Rome for veneration, and introduced new devotions including the Seven Sorrows of Mary, the Sacred Heart, and, on February 21, 1857, the Forty Hours' Devotion.

On July 8, 1852, the Bishop's residence was destroyed in a spate of severe fires, causing Bourget to move his accommodations to the Hospice Saint-Joseph until August 31, 1855, and thereafter to an episcopal residence at Mont Saint-Joseph. The same fires also destroyed the Saint-Jacques Cathedral. Bourget planned to commission a scale reproduction of Rome's St Peter's Basilica to serve as a replacement, and engaged first Victor Bourgeau (who claimed such a scale reproduction could not be achieved) and then Joseph Michaud to design the new cathedral. However, work did not eventually commence until 1875. In 1894, subsequent to Bourget's death, the structure was completed and consecrated as St James Cathedral, and in 1955 was rededicated as Mary, Queen of the World Cathedral.

== Involvement in secular politics ==
=== Institut Canadien de Montréal ===
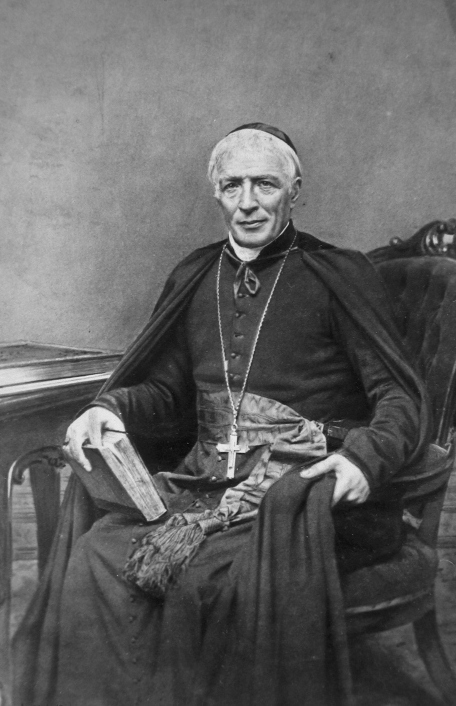
Ignace Bourget, circa 1862

By the time of the second provincial council held in Quebec City in 1854, Bourget had become distrustful of the Institut Canadien de Montréal, a liberal literary association which Bourget saw as anti-clericist and subversive. He used his influence at the provincial council to cause a disciplinary regulation to be drawn up, dated June 4, 1854, declaring that members of "literary institutes [at which] readings are given there which are anti-religious" were not to be admitted to the Roman Catholic sacraments. Despite the regulation, eleven members of the Institut were elected to the Legislative Assembly in late 1854, where they began to campaign for the separation of church and state in education through the institution of nondenominational schools.

In 1858 Bourget commenced a series of pastoral letters attacking liberals, anti-clericists, and the Institut Canadien. The first of these, on March 10, 1858, focused on what he saw as the evils of the French Revolution and revolutions generally, which he alleged were caused by the circulation of immoral books. The letter was the focus of a meeting by the Institut Canadien on April 13, 1854, where Institut member Hector Fabre suggested the Institut self-censor its own access to the purportedly immoral books. No resolution was reached.

On April 30, 1858, Bourget wrote a second letter which demanded the removal of "evil books" from the collection of the Institut Canadien, backed by the threat of excommunication for all those who visited its library or attended its sessions and readings. As a result of this and the April 13 meeting, a significant number of Institut members including Hector Fabre left to form a competing organisation, the Institut Canadien-Français. In a third letter dated May 31, 1858 Bourget directly attacked the remaining leaders of the Institut Canadien, as well as the liberal paper Le Pays, as anti-clericists and revolutionaries, and argued that the mere idea of freedom of religious and political opinion was contrary to church doctrine.

The Institut Canadien unsuccessfully attempted to reconcile with Bourget in 1864, and a petition seeking reconciliation was addressed to Pope Pius IX by 17 Catholic members of the Institut in 1865, to no effect. Bourget made further unfavourable reports to the Holy Office regarding the Institut in 1866 and 1869, and in July 1869 the Annuaire de l’Institut Canadien pour 1868 was placed on the Index Librorum Prohibitorum (Vatican list of banned books). The Guibord case (see below) and the events of 1869 to 1874 marked the final decline of the Institut. Its membership, which in 1858 had numbered 700, was by 1867 reduced to 300 and by 1875 only 165. In 1871 the Institut closed its debating room, and in 1880 it closed its library.

=== The fall of the Papal States ===
Bourget was concerned not only with politics in Montreal, but also with politics in Italy, which directly affected the affairs of the Roman Catholic Church as a whole. Between 1849 and 1870, the Italian peninsula underwent dramatic political changes, culminating in the unification of Italy into one nation. This had severe consequences for the Vatican and for the Roman Catholic Church. In 1848 Pope Pius IX was evacuated from Rome, and on September 20, 1870, the Papal States were annexed to the Kingdom of Italy, effectively ending their sovereignty. These upheavals were a source of great concern to many Catholics, and they were of particular importance to Bourget, who as an ultramontane believed firmly in the supreme authority of the Pope in all matters both temporal and spiritual.

On October 23, 1854, Bourget travelled to Europe, where he remained until July 29, 1856. He visited Rome to represent the ecclesiastical province at the proclamation of the dogma of the Immaculate Conception on December 8, 1854, and then spent time in Italy and France. While in France he published a book on Roman liturgy entitled Ceremonial des évêques commenté et expliqué par les usages et traditions de la sainte Eglise romaine avec le texte latin, par un évêque suffragant de la province ecclésiastique de Québec, au Canada, anciennement appelé Nouvelle-France, complimentary copies of which he distributed to all the French bishops.

In a series of pastoral letters in 1860, Bourget addressed the ongoing unification of Italy. He argued that the revolution in Italy was attacking the Church "in order next to overthrow unimpeded the rest of the universe", and characterised Canada's liberal books and newspapers as accomplices in this alleged conspiracy. The liberal newspaper Le Pays and its editor Louis-Antoine Dessaulles were often the subjects of Bourget's pastoral letters, particularly seven long letters written by Bourget in February 1862 directly addressed to the newspaper, which the owners of Le Pays refused to publish.

In 1862, Bourget again travelled to Rome, this time with the goal of representing the Province of Quebec at the canonization of the Japanese martyrs. While there he was made a Roman count and Assistant at the Papal Throne.

In 1868 Bourget was instrumental in the recruitment and enlistment of seven detachments of Canadian Papal Zouaves (volunteer infantry regiments), comprising 507 individuals, who were sent to Rome to assist the papacy in the defence of the Papal States at a cost to the church of at least $111,630. They there joined troops from France, Belgium, the Netherlands and Ireland, but were ultimately unsuccessful in preventing Rome's annexation by the Kingdom of Italy.

=== New Brunswick Common Schools Act of 1871 ===
On April 5, 1871, a bill was tabled in the parliament of the Province of New Brunswick which provided for the establishment of government-operated "common schools" requiring compulsory attendance of students. On May 17, 1871, the bill was passed into law as the Common Schools Act of 1871. The Common Schools Act replaced the Public Schools Act 1858, and it included provisions forbidding the teaching of catechism courses, prohibiting teachers from wearing religious garb, and requiring teachers to obtain government certification. The provisions effectively abolished the system of religious schooling which had operated in New Brunswick until that time. The enactment resulted from government doubt as to the quality of the religious education being provided, and concerns about attendance rates among enrolled pupils, which by 1871 were as low as 55%.

John Sweeny, bishop of Saint John fought an unsuccessful campaign against the act for several years, both through the auspices of Catholic MPs in the New Brunswick parliament, and via challenge in the courts. However, he was unsuccessful. He also urged Catholics to stop paying the school tax in protest, to which the government responded by imprisoning key priests and seizing property, including Sweeny's carriage.

Finally on May 18, 1873, Sweeny attended the provincial council of the Quebec church, where he invited the bishops of Quebec to intervene in New Brunswick affairs with the goal of supporting the cause of religious schooling. Bourget, who had had a key role in developing Lower Canada's system of religious schooling, accepted the invitation. The act prevented the teaching of Catholicism, regarded by the Roman Catholic Church as one of its key duties. On May 19, Bourget and Bishop Louis-François Laflèche co-authored and released a statement opposing the Common Schools Act, with the effect that several Conservative MPs of New Brunswick hailing from Quebec threatened to break ranks and support a motion of no-confidence against the government. The New Brunswick government responded by offering to pay the church's costs in the ongoing legal action over the act if the no-confidence motion was not passed - a deal which the church accepted.

The legal challenge made its way to the Judicial Committee of the Privy Council in England, at that time Canada's highest court of appeal, where the Privy Council rejected the church's case, effectively endorsing the government. However, discontent with the Common Schools Act continued to grow, culminating in 1875 when a protest at the town of Caraquet, New Brunswick devolved into a riot and two people were shot. Following the riots, amendments to the Act were made and the common schools system was eventually abandoned, replaced with a predominantly public schooling system but retaining government-subsidised religious schools.

Although New Brunswick ended up with a primarily secular schooling system, the civil unrest caused by the passage of the Common Schools Act and Bourget's public interference may have deterred the parliament of Quebec from following New Brunswick's lead, as Quebec had no Ministry of Education from 1875 to 1964.

=== Guibord case ===
On November 18, 1869, Joseph Guibord, a professed Catholic and member of the Institut Canadien, died. His widow, Henrietta Brown, applied to have Guibord buried in Notre Dame des Neiges, a Catholic cemetery. Due to Bourget's earlier excommunication of the Institut, reinforced by a letter written by Bourget that year, Brown was told that Guibord could not be buried in the sanctified area of the cemetery reserved for Roman Catholics, although the cemetery curate offered to bury Guibord without religious rites in the section used for non-Roman Catholics and unbaptised infants, and without religious rites. Brown did not accept this offer, and Guibord's remains were therefore temporarily deposited in the vault of the local Protestant cemetery.

Prominent lawyers Rodolphe Laflamme and Joseph Doutre commenced legal proceedings on behalf of Guibord's widow and eventually took the case to the Judicial Committee of the Privy Council in England, which was at that time the court of supreme jurisdiction for Canada. Their argument was that under the civil law of Canada the Church had a legal obligation to afford Guibord a Catholic burial.

In 1874 the Privy Council ruled that Guibord should be buried in a Catholic cemetery, and ordered that Bourget and the Roman Catholic Church pay the costs of the legal proceedings. Following the ruling, Bourget went to the Notre Dame des Neiges Cemetery and deconsecrated the burial plot where the Privy Council had ordered that Guibord could be buried. Upon arrival at the cemetery, the hearse containing Guibord's body was pelted with rocks by an angry mob. The body was later escorted to the grave plot by soldiers.

== Involvement in church politics ==
=== Université Laval ===
In 1852, Bourget was involved with the founding of the Université Laval by the Séminaire de Québec. At the time, Bourget believed that responsibility for the university was to be shared by all bishops within the episcopal province of Quebec. However, the organisation and management of the university were subsequently taken over by the archbishop and seminary of Quebec, with the result that by 1858 none of the local (Montreal) classical colleges were affiliated with the university.

This led Bourget, from 1862, to plan the founding of a new Catholic university in Montreal. This was in part prompted by increasing numbers of Catholic students enrolling at the (secular) McGill College and elsewhere to study law and medicine out of lack of a Catholic alternative. In 1865 Bourget petitioned the Vatican for the establishment of a new Catholic university in Montreal but his application was rejected. In 1870 the Université Laval proposed opening a branch in Montreal but Bourget rejected this proposition as it did not accept his authority over it as bishop. In 1876 the Vatican ordered the establishment of a branch of the Université Laval at Montreal, answering only to Quebec (not Bourget), but Bourget resigned as Bishop shortly thereafter and therefore was never required to enact the order.

=== Division of Notre-Dame parish ===
By 1863, the Montreal parish of Notre-Dame had grown in size to a population of around 100,000, with its parish priest by tradition being the Sulpician superior of the Grand Séminaire de Montréal. Following an application by the Superior General of Saint-Sulpice in Paris, Bourget was asked by the Holy See to comment on the situation of Notre-Dame parish. Bourget commented that he was happy with the current situation, providing that the parish priest was wholly subordinated to Bourget as bishop, meaning that Bourget would have the power to dismiss them from the position.

The Sulpicians disputed Bourget's proposed hierarchy and both Bourget and the Superior General of Saint-Sulpice were summoned to Rome. The Sulpicians refused to allow Bourget to have authority to dismiss the parish priest and threatened to withdraw their entire religious community of 57 priests from Montreal, which would have created a crippling shortage of clergy in the diocese. Negotiations were held with the result that in 1865 Bourget was given authority to divide the parish of Notre-Dame on the condition that the new parishes would be offered first to the Sulpicians, that the Sulpicians would name their own priests to the parishes but would require them to be invested by the Bishop, and that the new parish priests could be dismissed by either the Bishop or the Superior of the Sulpicians.

Between September 1866 and December 1867, Bourget divided Notre-Dame into ten new canonical parishes. However, in order to invest the parishes with legal existence they were required to be incorporated. The Sulpicians advised the government not to recognise the new parishes, claiming that they were merely succursal chapels of the parish of Notre-Dame. This resulted in a series of protracted legal and political battles between Bourget and the Sulpicians which ended with Bourget's victory in 1873, when all the parishes obtained their civil registration.

== Resignation, late life and death ==
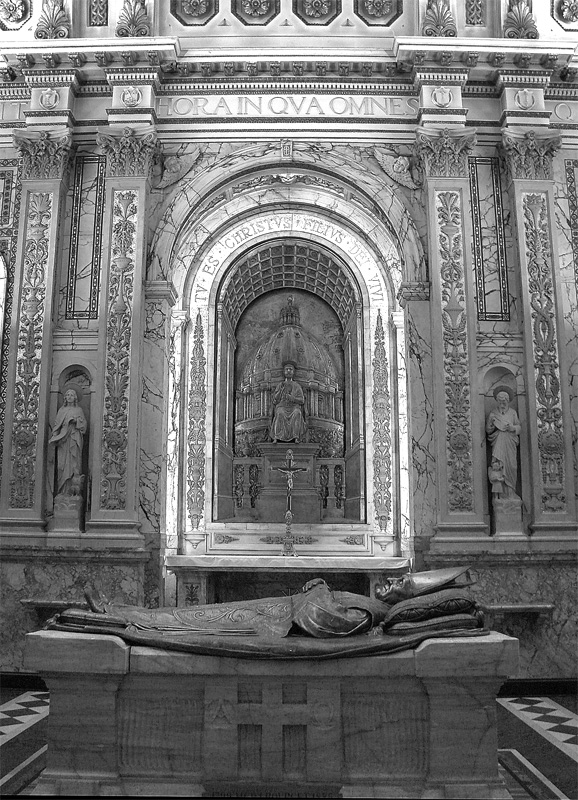
Bourget's tomb inside the Cathedral-Basilica Mary Queen of the World

From October 27 to 30, 1872, Bourget celebrated the golden anniversary of his ordination, and on May 1, 1873, he ordained Édouard-Charles Fabre as coadjutor bishop in a ceremony at the church of the Collège Sainte-Marie. Around this time, Bourget was frequently beset by illness, but despite this he continued a series of energetic attacks on liberalism, including liberalism within the Catholic Church. These attacks caused the Archbishop of Quebec and members of his inner circle to question Bourget's judgement and ability to perform as Bishop. The Archbishop of Quebec was also concerned that the church was becoming increasingly involved in secular politics, to its detriment. Ignazio Persico, parish priest of Sillery, proposed that Rome undertake an inquiry into the matter, including Bourget's conduct.

To forestall the inquiry, on April 28, 1876, Bourget resigned as Bishop of Montreal and on May 15 that resignation was accepted by the Pope, to take effect in September. Following his resignation, Bourget was appointed archbishop of the titular see of Marcianopolis, and in early 1877 he retired to Sault-au-Récollet, taking with him his secretary, Joseph-Octave Paré.

Between August 12 and October 30, 1881, Bourget travelled to Rome, pleading unsuccessfully for the establishment of a second Catholic university in Montreal. In 1882, Bourget took part in a fundraising drive to help raise money to pay off the Diocese of Montreal's significant debts, which totalled some $840,000. On October 11, 1882, he announced that a sum of $84,782 had been raised through these efforts. On November 9, 1882, Bourget made his final public appearance at Boucherville, celebrating the diamond anniversary of his ordination as the conclusion of his fundraising tour.

Bourget died on June 8, 1885, at Sault-au-Récollet. A funeral service was conducted by Father Collin, the Superior of the Sulpicians, at the Church of Notre Dame, and Bourget's body was buried alongside that of his predecessor Jean-Jacques Lartigue in a vault under the southwest pillar of the dome of the then-unfinished St James Cathedral, later renamed as Mary, Queen of the World Cathedral. On March 20, 1993, his remains were transferred to the cathedral's mortuary chapel for bishops and archbishops, of which his mausoleum forms the centre. On June 24, 1903, a statue of Bourget created by artist Louis-Philippe Hébert was unveiled in the parvis of the St James Cathedral. The statue was funded by approximately $25,000 in donations from Catholic clergy and faithful. In 2005 a cleaning and restoration of the statue was performed.

== See also ==
- Ignace Bourget Monument

== Sources ==
=== Books ===
- Anonymous (1875). History of the Guibord Case: Ultramontanism versus Law and Human Rights. Montreal: Witness Printing House. ISBN 9780665056437. OCLC 499360509.
- Grégoire, Hélène (2007). Rosalie Cadron-Jetté: A Story of Courage and Compassion. Montreal: Rosalie-Cadron-Jetté Centre.

=== Reference works ===
- Bruchési, Paul (1907). "Ignace Bourget" . Catholic Encyclopedia. Vol. 2.
- Jean, Marguerite (2000). "Tavernier, Émilie". Dictionary of Canadian Biography Online.
- Murphy, Terrence (2000). "Sweeny, John". Dictionary of Canadian Biography Online.
- Snyder, Lorraine (2011). "New Brunswick School Question". The Canadian Encyclopedia. Archived from the original on May 15, 2005.
- Sylvain, Philippe (2000). "Bourget, Ignace". Dictionary of Canadian Biography Online.

=== Web content ===
- Zolf, Larry (August 6, 2003). "To hell with Jean Chrétien". Viewpoint: Larry Zolf. CBC News.

Catholic Church titles
Preceded by Jean-Jacques Lartigue	Bishop of Montreal; 1840–1876	Succeeded by Edouard Charles Fabre
