= Hôpital de la Miséricorde =

Geography
- Location: 840-890 Boulevard Rene-Lévesque Est, Montreal, Quebec; H2L 2L4
- Coordinates: 45.51489°N 73.55534°W

History
- Founded: 1853; 173 years ago

Hôpital de la Miséricorde is former Quebecois hospital site opened in the 1850s by the Misericordia Sisters.

The facility was focused on single mothers and orphans.

== History ==
Located at 840-890 Boulevard Rene Lévesque, the complex was built over several phases from 1850 to 1947. Renamed as Hôpital Jacques-Vogel, it functioned as a long-term care facility from 1975 until it was closed in 2012. The site has been subject to various redevelopment plans since 2012 and as of 2025 is owned by Alta Canada.
