= Ignace Bourget Monument =

Monument in Quebec, Canada

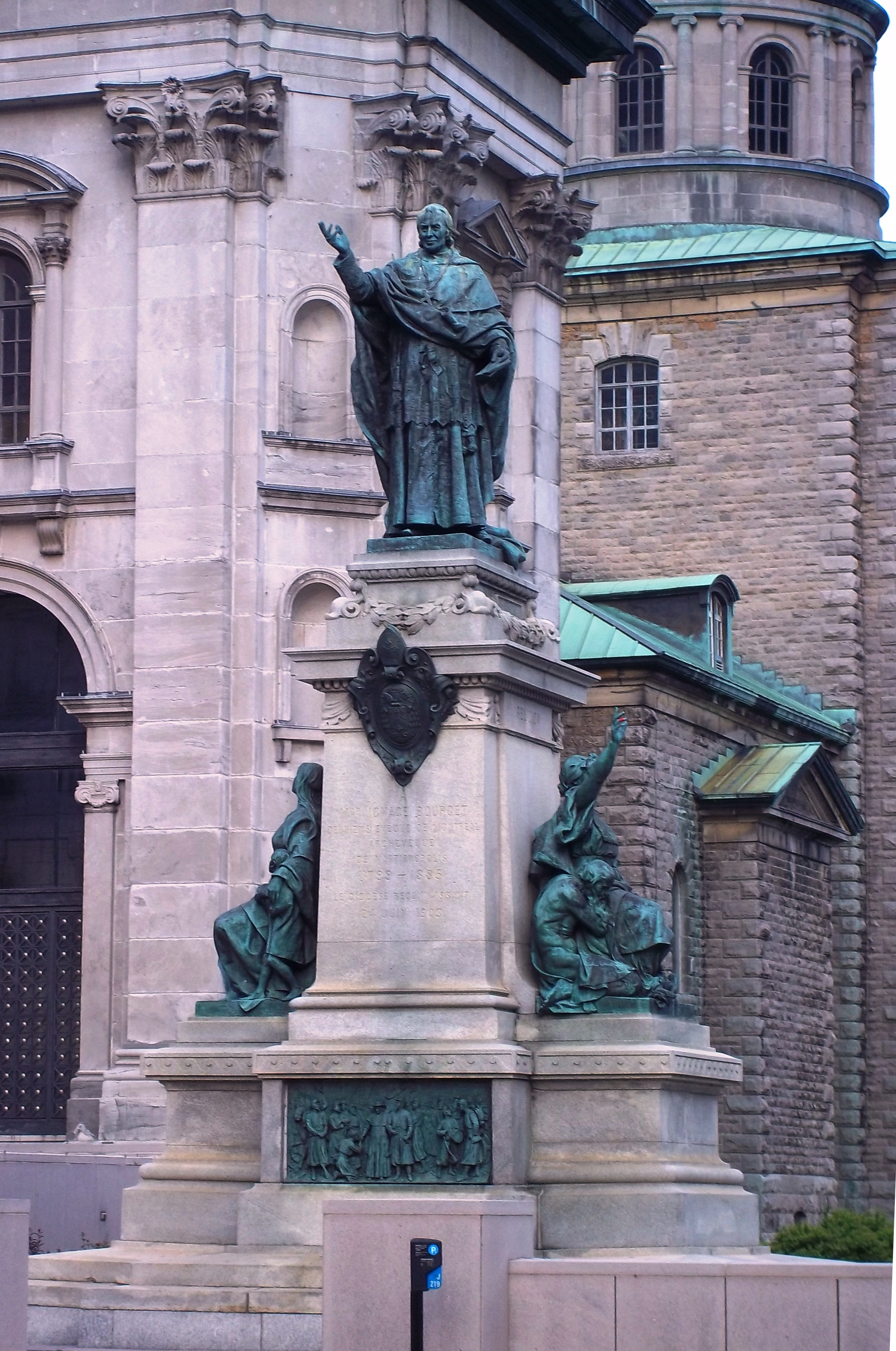
- The monument in 2011
- Interactive map of Ignace Bourget Monument
- Location: Mary, Queen of the World Cathedral, Montreal
- Coordinates: 45°29′57.10″N 73°34′6.10″W
- Designer: Louis-Philippe Hébert
- Type: Historical Monument
- Material: Bronze, granite
- Opening date: June 24, 1903
- Dedicated to: Ignace Bourget

The Ignace Bourget Monument is a monument of Louis-Philippe Hébert located in front of Montreal's Mary, Queen of the World Cathedral, in Quebec, Canada.

== Overview ==
The monument in memory of Bishop Ignace Bourget was unveiled on June 24, 1903, in front of the replica of St. Peter's Basilica in Rome, which he had built. A bas-relief shows the bishop studying the plans for the building. Two allegorical statues represent Religion and Charity. It was erected by both clergy and faithful, who contributed $25,000. The sculptures and bas-reliefs were created by Louis-Philippe Hébert.

== Allegorical statues ==
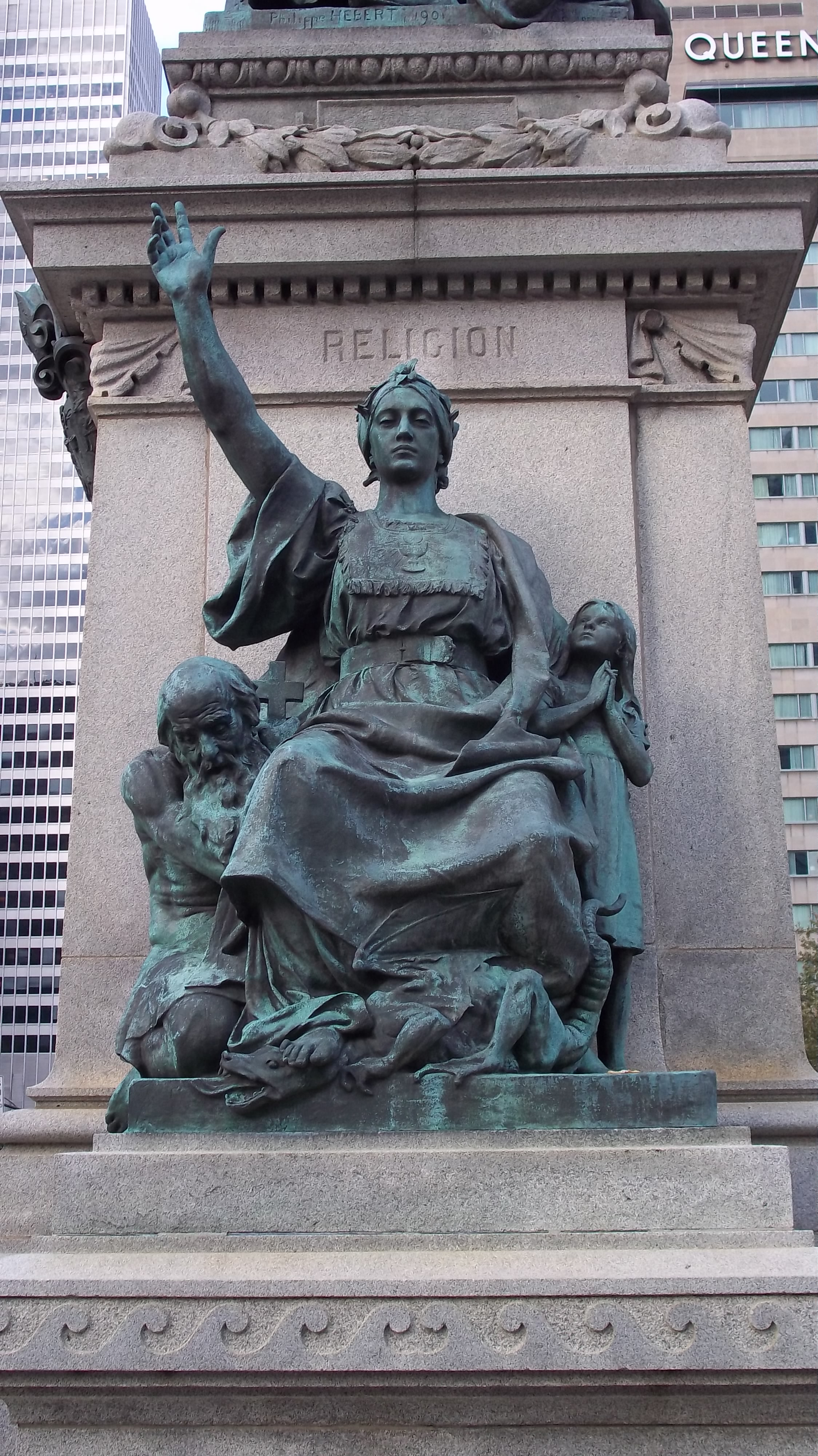
Religion

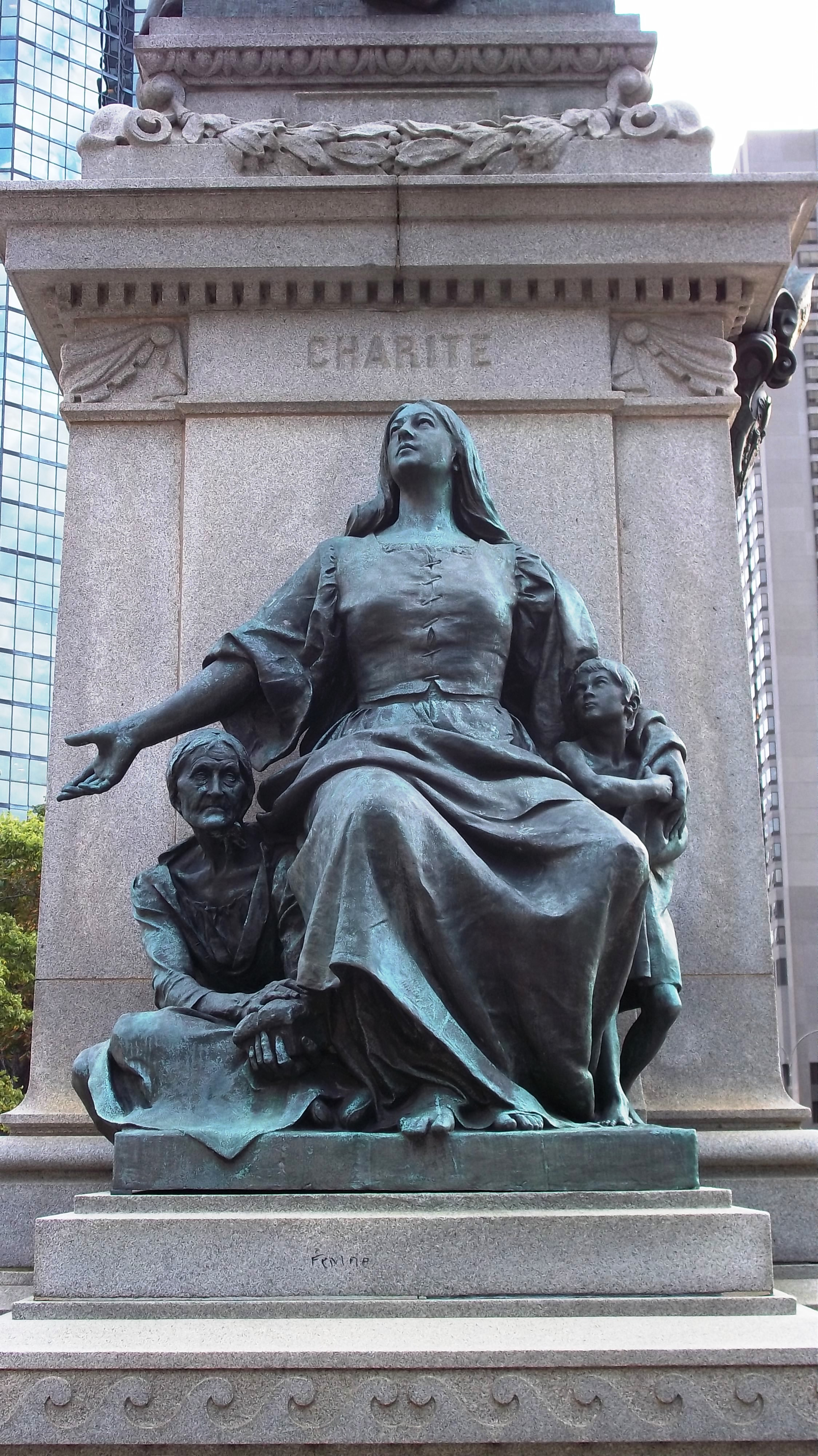
Charity

== Bas-reliefs ==
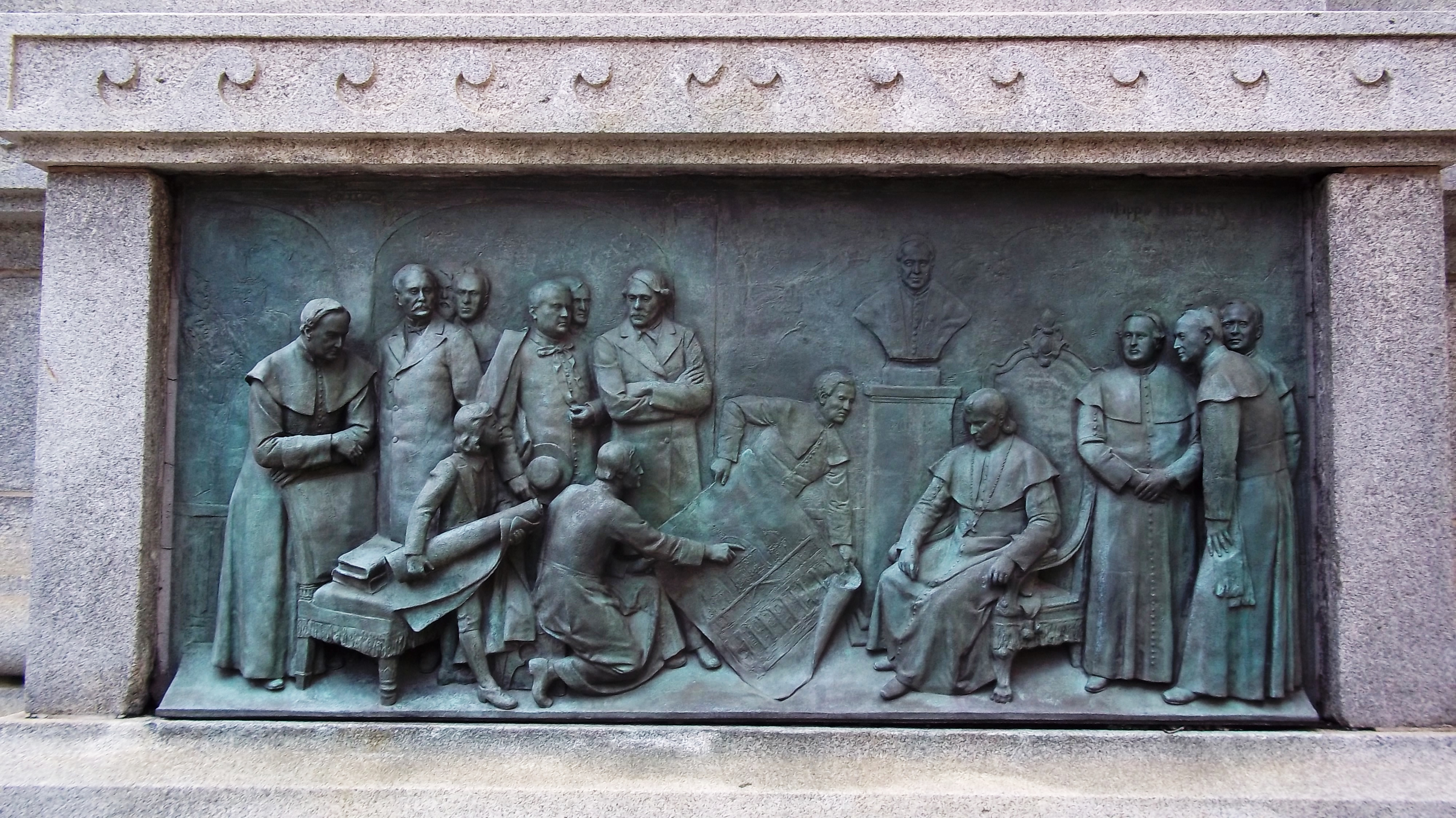
Bishop studying the plans for the building

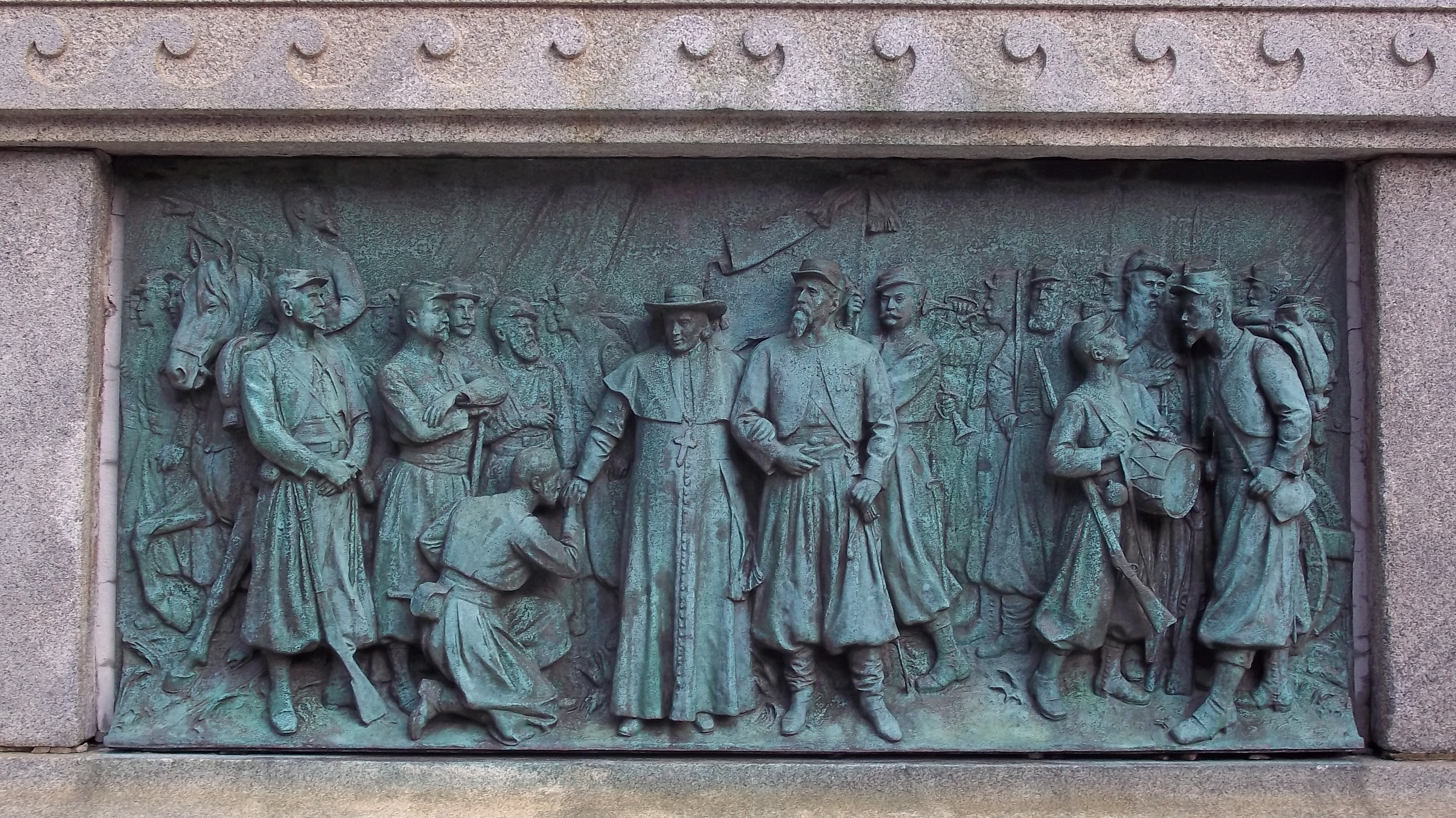
Bishop in midst of the Papal Zouaves
