= Mary, Queen of the World Cathedral =

Historic church in Montreal, Quebec, Canada

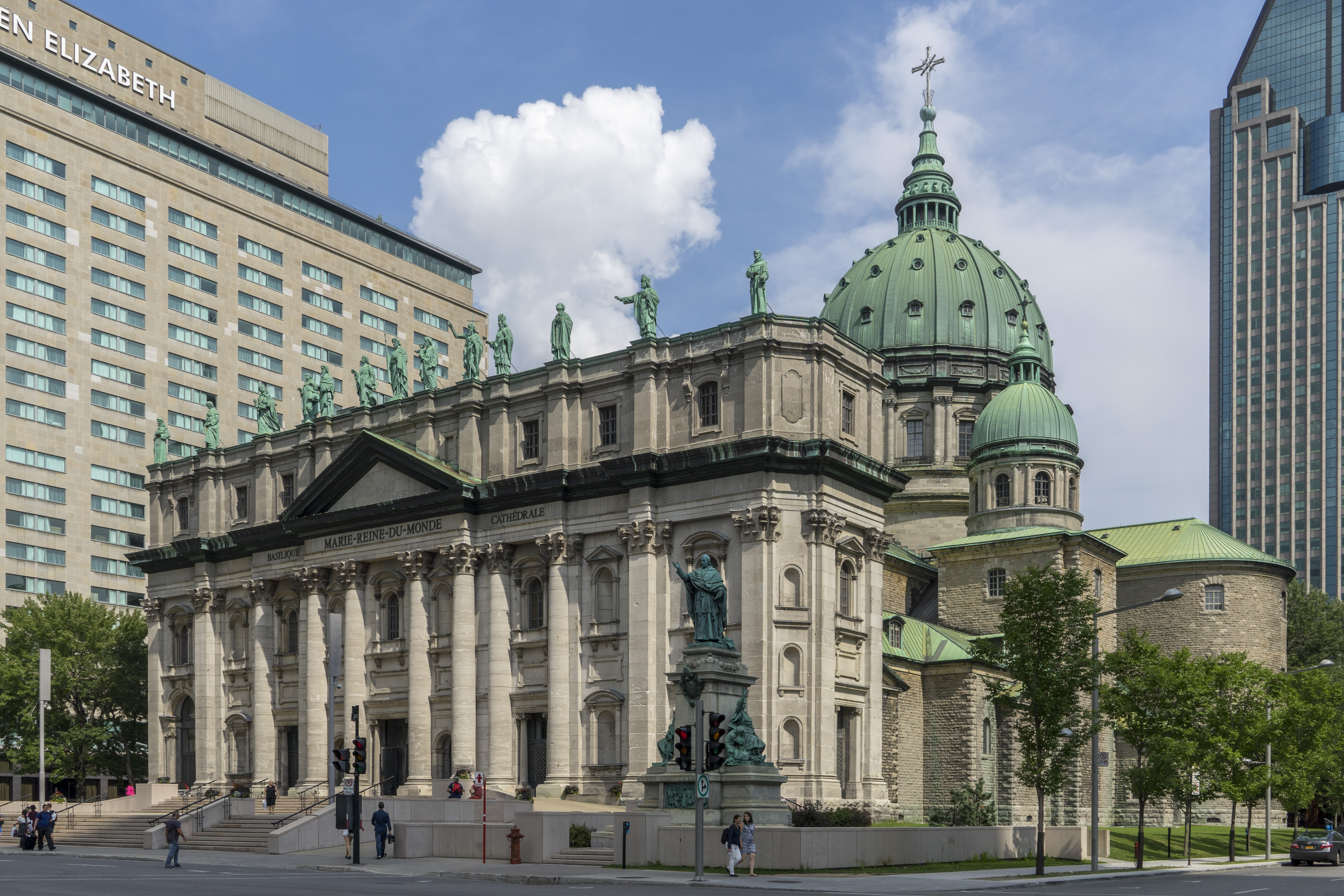

- Location within Montreal
- 45°29′57.10″N 73°34′6.10″W
- Location: 1085 De la Cathédrale street Montreal, Quebec; H3B 2V3
- Denomination: Roman Catholic

History
- Status: Cathedral, minor basilica

Architecture
- Functional status: Active
- Style: Renaissance, Baroque
- Groundbreaking: 1875
- Completed: 1894

Specifications
- Length: 101.5 metres (333 ft)
- Width: 45.72 metres (150.0 ft)
- Height: 76.8 metres (252 ft) (cupola)

Administration
- Province: Montreal
- Metropolis: Montreal
- Archdiocese: Montreal

Clergy
- Archbishop: The Most Rev. Christian Lépine
- Vicar: Fr. Willy Junius

National Historic Site of Canada
- Official name: Marie-Reine-du-Monde Cathedral National Historic Site of Canada
- Designated: March 28, 2000

Mary, Queen of the World Cathedral or in full Mary, Queen of the World and St. James the Great Cathedral (French: basilique-cathédrale de Marie-Reine-du-Monde et de Saint-Jacques-le-Majeur) is a minor basilica in Montreal, Quebec, Canada, and the seat of the Roman Catholic Archdiocese of Montreal. It is the third largest church in Quebec after Saint Joseph's Oratory (also in Montreal) and the Basilica of Sainte-Anne-de-Beaupré east of Quebec City. The building is 101 m (333 ft) in length, 46 m (150 ft) in width, and a maximum height of 77 m (252 ft) at the cupola, the diameter of which is 23 m (75 ft).

The church is located at 1085 Cathedral Street at the corner of René Lévesque Boulevard and Metcalfe Street, near the Bonaventure metro station and Central Station in downtown Montreal. It and the connected Archdiocese main buildings form the eastern side of Place du Canada, and occupies a dominant presence on Dorchester Square.

== History ==
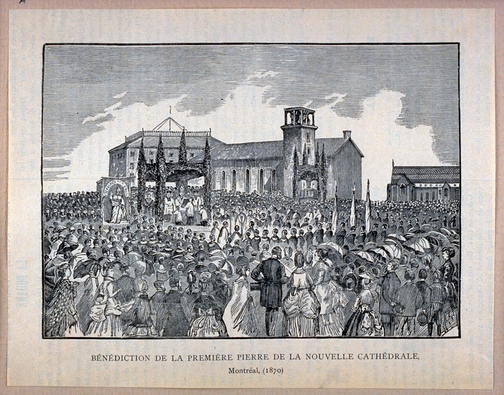
Benediction of the first stone used to build the cathedral, c. 1870

The construction of the cathedral was ordered by Mgr. Ignace Bourget, second bishop of Montreal, to replace the former Saint-Jacques Cathedral which had burned in 1852. His choice to create a scale model of Saint Peter's Basilica in Rome was in response to a rivalry with the Sulpician order who had been the feudal seigneurs of Montreal, and with the Anglican Church, both of which favoured the Neo-Gothic style instead. The site also sparked controversy due to its location in the western part of downtown, in a then predominantly English neighbourhood far from the homes of the French-Canadian church-goers.

The first architect, Victor Bourgeau, refused the project after studying St. Peter's, saying that it could not be reproduced on a smaller scale. At the time, the Holy See and the Papal States were threatened by the nationalist troops of Victor Emmanuel II, king of Piedmont, who was attempting to assert control over all Italy. The undeterred bishop Bourget reacted to these events by sending a total of 507 Canadian Zouaves to defend the Papal territories in Italy, whose names are engraved in gold letters on the marble slabs in the cathedral. Their motto is: "Love God and go your way." A painting depicting Colonel Athanase de Charette, commander of the Papal Zouaves, was made in 1885 by Lionel Royer. Fr. Joseph Michaud, the chaplain of the Papal Zouave volunteers of Montreal, was sent to Rome to secretly produce a scale model to work from.

Work began in 1875 and the new church was consecrated in 1894 as Saint James Cathedral, after Saint James the Great, the patron of the parish the church served. At the time it was the largest church in Quebec. It was made a minor basilica in 1919 by Pope Benedict XV. It was rededicated in 1955 to Mary, Queen of the World, by Pope Pius XII at the request of cardinal Paul-Émile Léger. (The pope had proclaimed this title for Mary in his 1954 encyclical Ad caeli reginam.)

Between 1955 and 1960, several restoration works were executed. On March 28, 2000, the cathedral was designated a National Historic Site of Canada.

As of 2003, the cathedral's esplanade and narthex have undergone significant reconstruction. The exterior statue of Bishop Ignace Bourget was cleaned and restored in 2005.

== Design ==
=== Chapels ===
==== Baptistery ====
A small chapel is dedicated to baptism ceremonies. The marble baptismal font is mounted on a stucco crucifix sculpted by Louis-Philippe Hébert.

==== Bishops' mortuary chapel ====
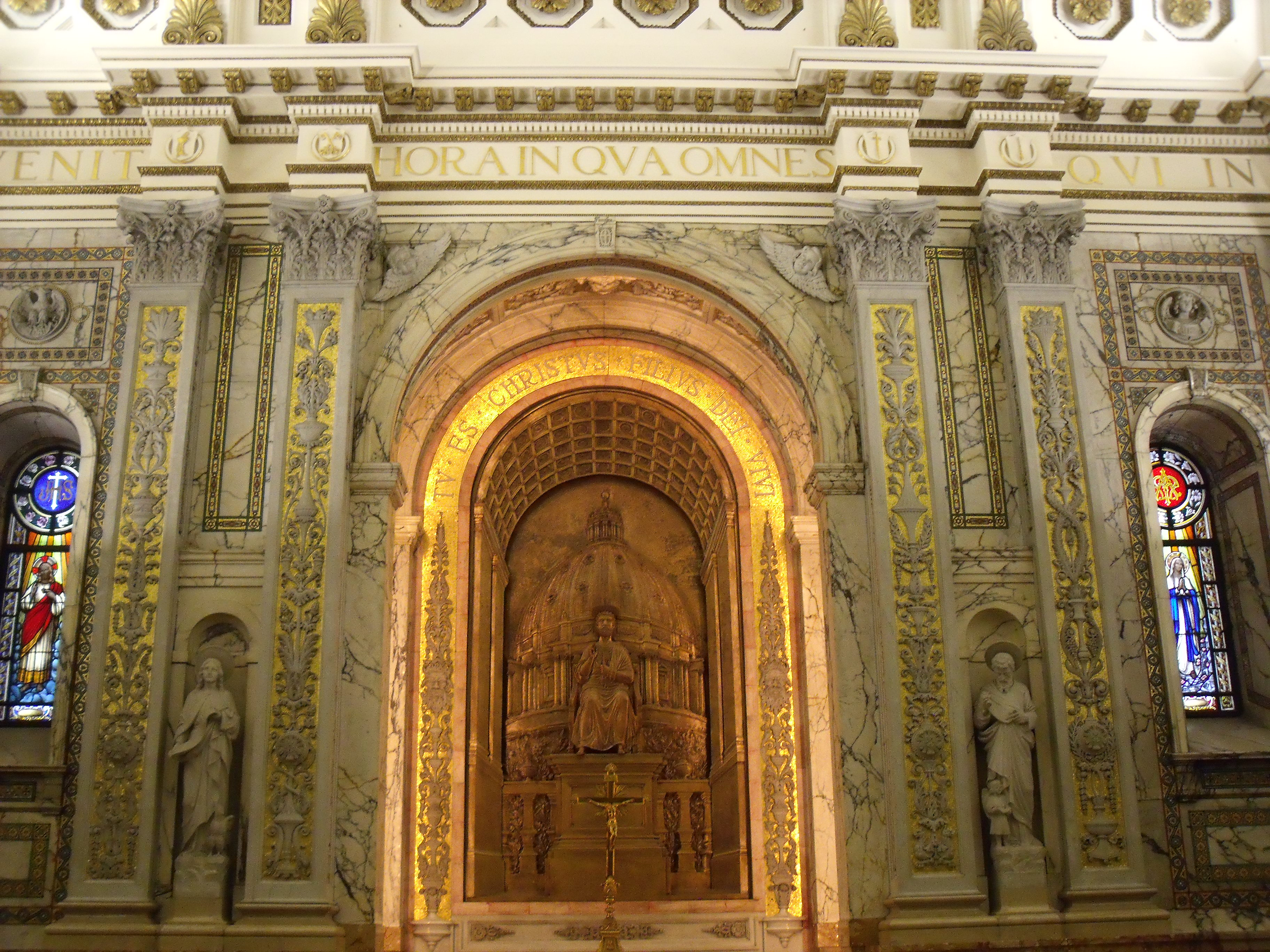
The bishop's mortuary chapel is located on the east wall of the cathedral.

The burial chapel, completed in 1933, is located on the east wall of the building, east of the nave, halfway between the main entrance and the altar in the centre. The tomb of Mgr. Bourget, an art work which was created in Rome, is located in the centre. The remains of the bishop that lay in a crypt under one of the pillars in the cathedral were transferred to his tomb on April 27, 1933. The titular bishops are buried on the west side and the auxiliary bishops on the east-hand side.

The walls and floors are made of marble imported from Italy and feature several mosaics. The bronze plaque above the altar depicts St. Peter's Basilica in Rome.

Since the cathedral was running out of space for burying auxiliary bishops, a second chapel was built next to the original one in 2005. Here an additional 15 vaults have been prepared.

==== Chapel of the Assumption ====
This chapel, also known as the Marriage Chapel, is located on the west side of the nave (across from the Bishop's Chapel). This work of art features a wood-carved altarpiece, decorated with gold leaf and framing a painting depicting the Assumption of the Virgin Mary. It was made around 1635 at the Benedictine Abbey in Bellelay, Switzerland by a Spanish monk. When the monks were forced to leave during the religious retaliation, the occupying French troops sold all the precious furniture in the Abbey. At the beginning of the 20th century, the Austrian architect-conservator Rodolphe Messmer discovered the altarpiece in the church of Suarce, France and acquired it. In 1994, Bruno Messmer donated it to the Roman Catholic Archdiocese of Montreal.

In 1957, Cardinal Paul-Émile Léger put the chapel at the disposal of the Order of Malta. The stained-glass windows are dedicated to this Order.

=== Ciborium ===
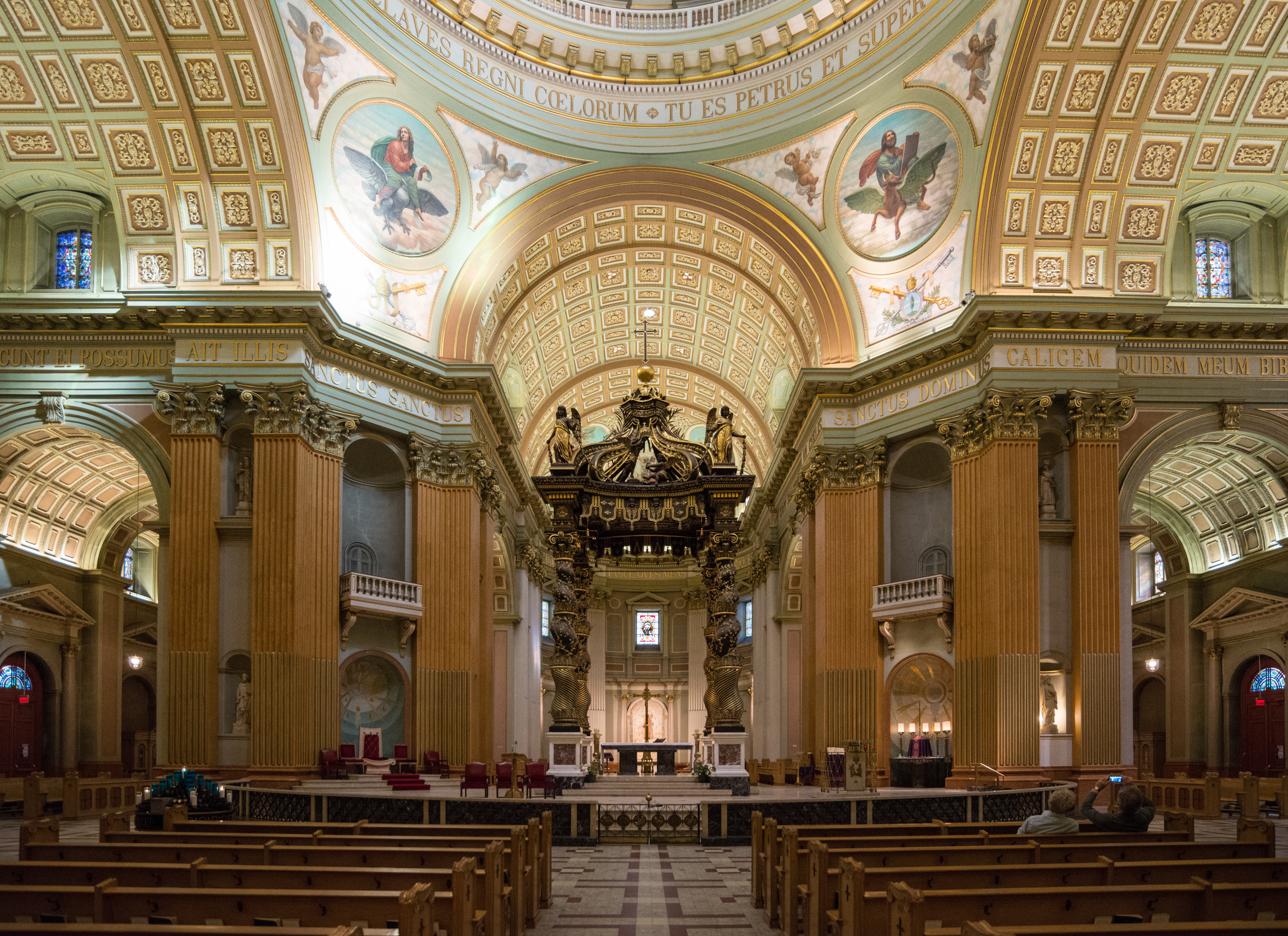
A neo-baroque ciborium is located under the dome of the building

Covering the altar, which is located under the dome, is a neo-baroque ciborium or baldaquin, with twisting columns. It was created in Rome in 1900 by Joseph-Arthur Vincent and is a reproduction of the famous 'baldacchino' in St. Peter's Basilica, created by Gian Lorenzo Bernini.

It is fully hand-made and made with red copper and gold leaf. The angels, garlands and papal insignia were sculpted between 1910 and 1911 by Olindo Gratton. This work of art was a donation to the cathedral by the Sulpicians.

=== Great Organ ===
Built by Casavant Frères, the organ was inaugurated on September 22, 1893. At that time, it consisted of 56 stops on three manuals and a pedal board. In 1951 the organ required maintenance, after which it was decided to rebuild the entire organ. Again, Casavant Frères was chosen for the job, and they added 20 stops and a manual.

In 1995–1996, the instrument was restored by Guilbault-Thérien from Saint-Hyacinthe. A few more additions were made, so that now the organ counts a total of 93 stops, four manuals and one pedal board.

=== Paintings ===
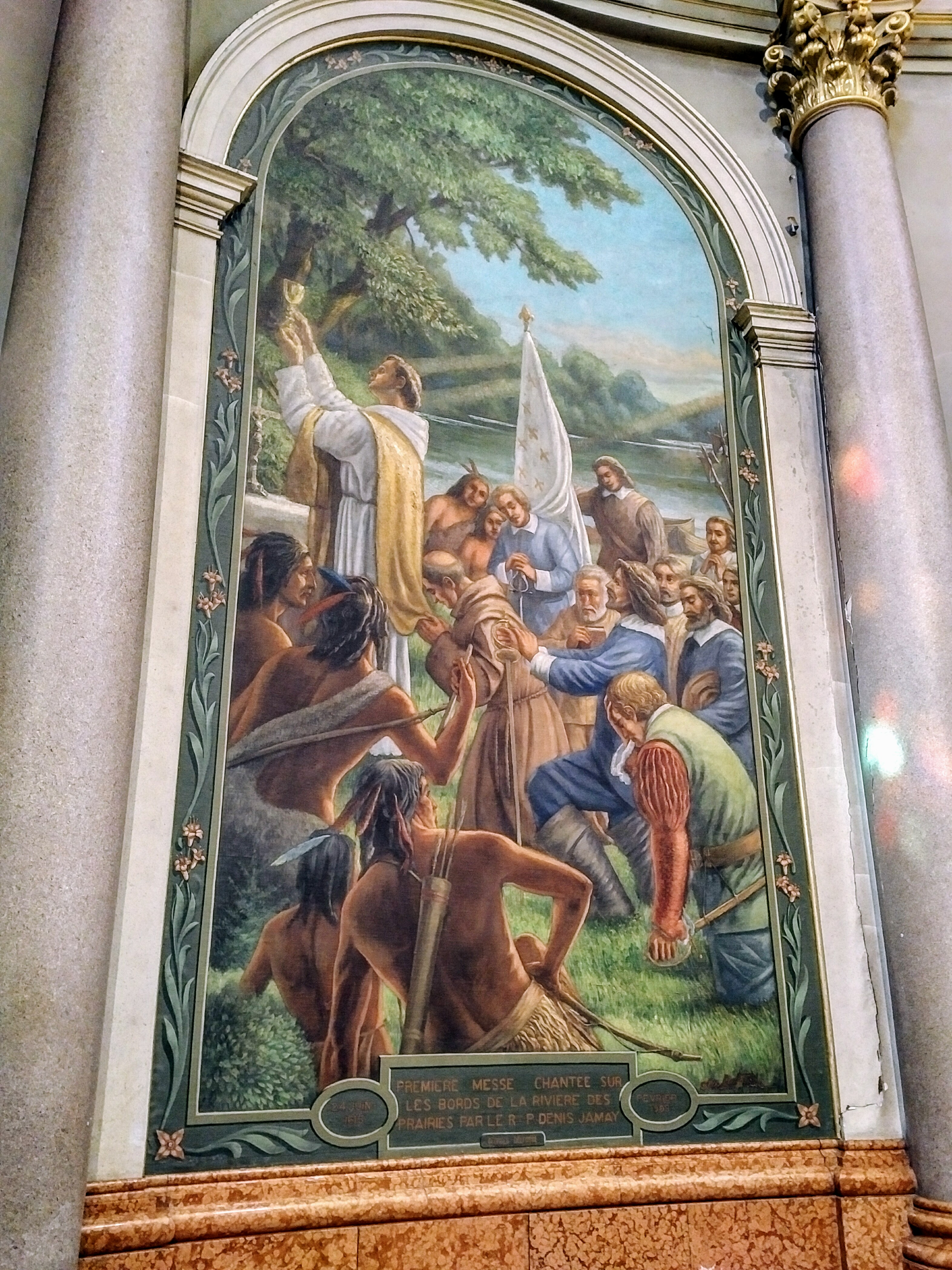
A paintings of the first Mass celebrated at Rivière-des-Prairies by Fr. Denis Jamet. The painting is one of several located inside the cathedral.

The aisles of the nave and the arches in the transept contain painting depicting historical events in the early days of Montreal (called Ville-Marie at the time). It contains nine paintings and still three empty spaces. The paintings are:

1. The aforementioned painting of colonel Athanase de Charette, commander of the Papal Zouaves of Montreal. Work by Lionel Ryder.
2. Marguerite d'Youville singing "Te Deum" to children during the fire that destroyed her hospital on May 18, 1765. Work by Georges Delfosse.
3. Marguerite Bourgeoys teaching her Amerindian pupils in 1694 at the foot of one of the historic towers on ground belonging to the Sulpicians. Work by Georges Delfosse.
4. The martyrdom of Jean de Brébeuf and Gabriel Lalemant in the land of the Hurons. The Iroquois tortured the Jesuit missionaries, of whom de Brébeuf can be seen in the centre with his hands tied to a stake. Work by Georges Delfosse.
5. Father Barthélemy Vimont saying the first Mass in Montreal on May 18, 1642. Paul de Chomedey, Sieur de Maisonneuve and Jeanne Mance, the co-founders of Montreal, can be seen attending the Mass. This work by Ernest Laurent was a gift from the French government to Paul Bruchési.
6. The consecration of the Associates of Montreal's project. On February 3, 1641, noble man and women, and priests, who dreamed of founding the city of Ville-Marie in New France, attend a Mass celebrated by Jean-Jacques Olier in the Notre-Dame of Paris to pray for the protection of Our Lady for what many considered to be a "foolish undertaking." Work by Georges Delfosse.
7. The first Mass celebrated at Rivière-des-Prairies by Father Denis Jamet on June 24, 1615. Joseph Le Caron holds the edge of Jamay's chasuble. Samuel de Champlain, founder of Quebec City, is in the centre. Work by Georges Delfosse.
8. The martyrdom of Nicolas Viel (seen in the boat) and his disciple Ahuntsic (seen already fallen in the water) by three Amerindians on the rapids at the Sault-au-Récollet. Work by Georges Delfosse.
9. Jeanne Mance, co-founder of Montreal, and the nursing sisters of Religious Hospitallers of St. Joseph tend to a sick child Montreal's first hospital, Hôtel-Dieu de Montréal. Work by Georges Delfosse.

=== Statues ===
In the apse is a statue of Mary, Queen of the World, patron of the cathedral, by Sylvia Daoust. In imitation of the statues of the 12 apostles on the façade of St. Peter's, the cathedral is topped by statues of the patron saints of 13 parishes of Montreal that donated toward the cathedral, including St. John the Baptist and St. Patrick. The statues were sculpted by Olindo Gratton between 1892 and 1898 and include:

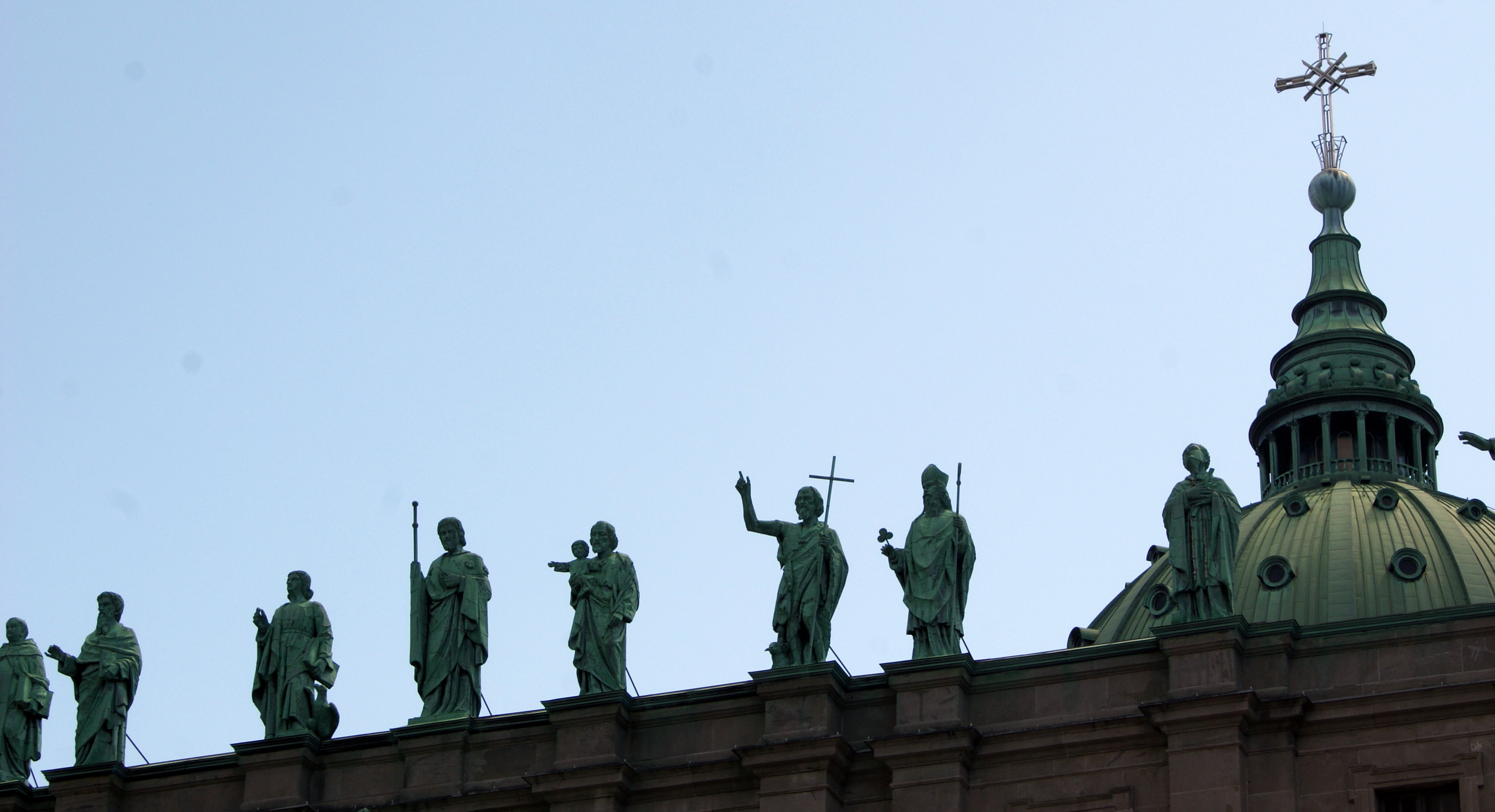
Statues of the patron saints of the parishes of Montreal atop the cathedral's main entrance

- Saint Anthony of Padua, patron of the Saint-Anthony-of-Padua parish (at 1950 Saint-Antoine Street West);
- Saint Vincent de Paul, patron of the Saint-Vincent-de-Paul parish in Laval;
- Saint Hyacinth;
- Saint Thomas Aquinas;
- Saint Paul;
- Saint John;
- Saint James the Greater, patron of this cathedral and its predecessor that was destroyed by fire, the Saint-Jacques Cathedral;
- Saint Joseph, patron of the Saint-Joseph parish in Rivière-des-Prairies;
- Saint John the Baptist, patron of the parish of the Saint-Jean-Baptiste Church;
- Saint Patrick, patron of the parish of the St. Patrick's Church;
- Saint Ignatius of Antioch;
- Saint Charles Borromeo, patron of the parish of the Saint-Charles Church in Pointe Saint-Charles;
- Saint Francis of Assisi.

Next to the church, there's also a monument for Ignace Bourget.

=== Texts ===
Several texts in golden letters decorate the inside of the cathedral. Since the building was originally dedicated to Saint James the Greater (and it still is), it explains why most of the Latin texts refer to his life.

Texts in the nave include:

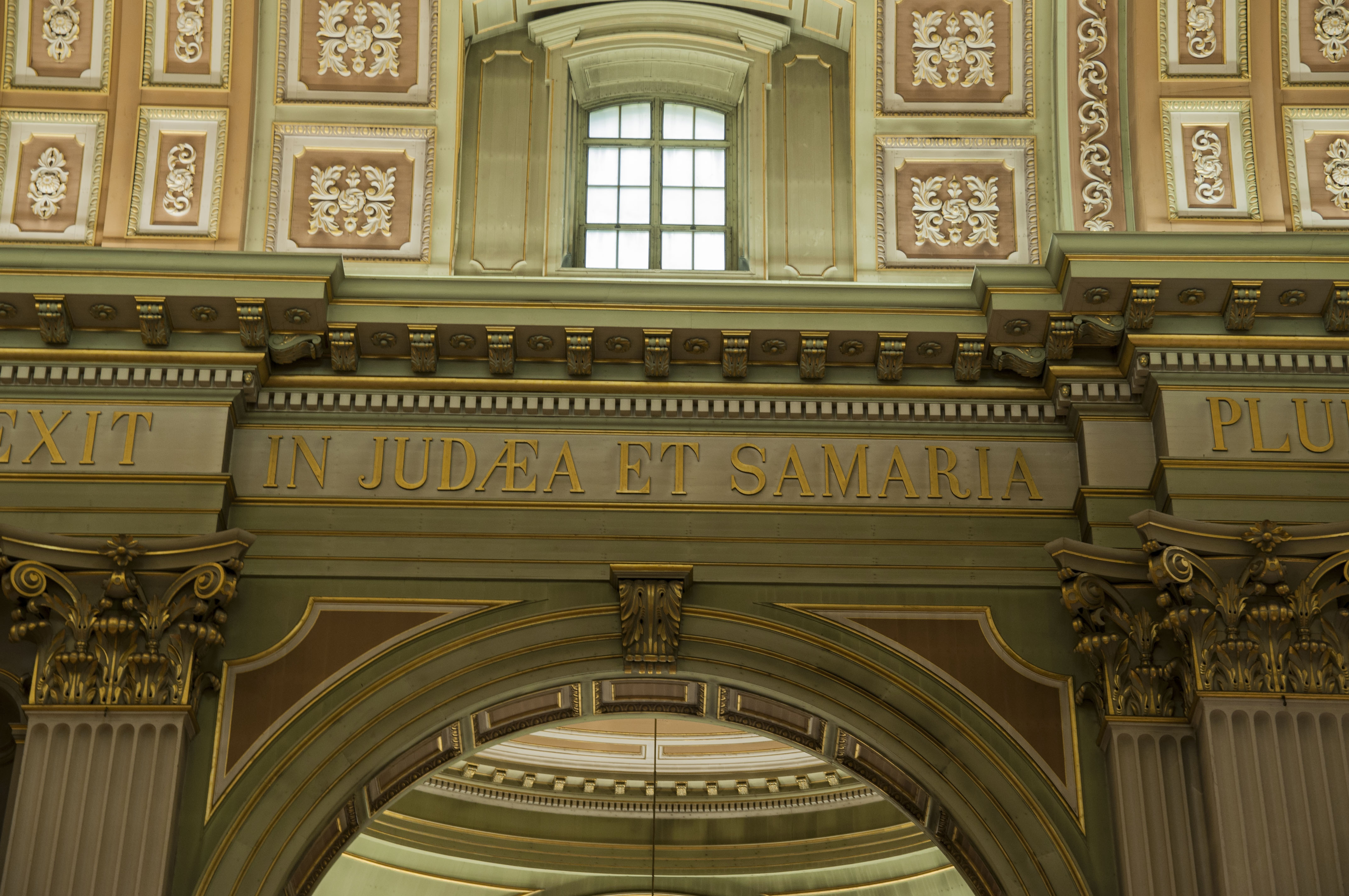
Golden letters adorn the inside of the cathedral

- On the side of the cathedra (east side): "He [James] is one of the three Apostles whom the Savior loves the most. In Judea and Samaria he converts many to the Christian faith." (Latin: "Is unus fuit ex tribus Apostolis, quos Salvator maxime dilexit. In Judæa et Samaria, plurimos ad Christianam fidem perduxit.")
- On the side of the tabernacle (west side): "He also converts some people in Spain, in Jerusalem he is condemned to death. He is the first of the Apostles that bears witness to Jesus with his blood." (Latin: "In Hispania aliquos convertit, Jerosolymae capite damnatus est. Primus apostolorum profuso sanguine testimonium Jesu dedit.")

The texts featured in the transepts are based on Matthew 20:22–23 and the brothers James and John asking Jesus to sit beside him, one on his left and one on his right, in his Kingdom.

- On the side of the cathedra (east side): "And Jesus, answering, said: You know not what you ask. Can you drink the chalice that I shall drink? They said to Him: We can. And he told them:" (Latin: "Respondens autem Iesus dixit nescitis quid petatis potestis bibere calicem quem ego bibiturus? Sum dicunt: Ei possumus. Ait illis:")
- On the side of the tabernacle (west side): "My chalice indeed you shall drink, but to sit at my right or left is not for me to grant, [these places] belong to those for whom they have been prepared by my Father." (Latin: "Calicem quidem meum bibetis sedere autem ad dexteram meam et sinistram non est meum dare vobis sed quibus paratum est a Patre meo.")

Two other texts, both from Matthew 16:17–19, speak of the vocation of Saint Peter, head of the Apostles. These texts can also be found in the nave inside St. Peter's Basilica in Vatican City.

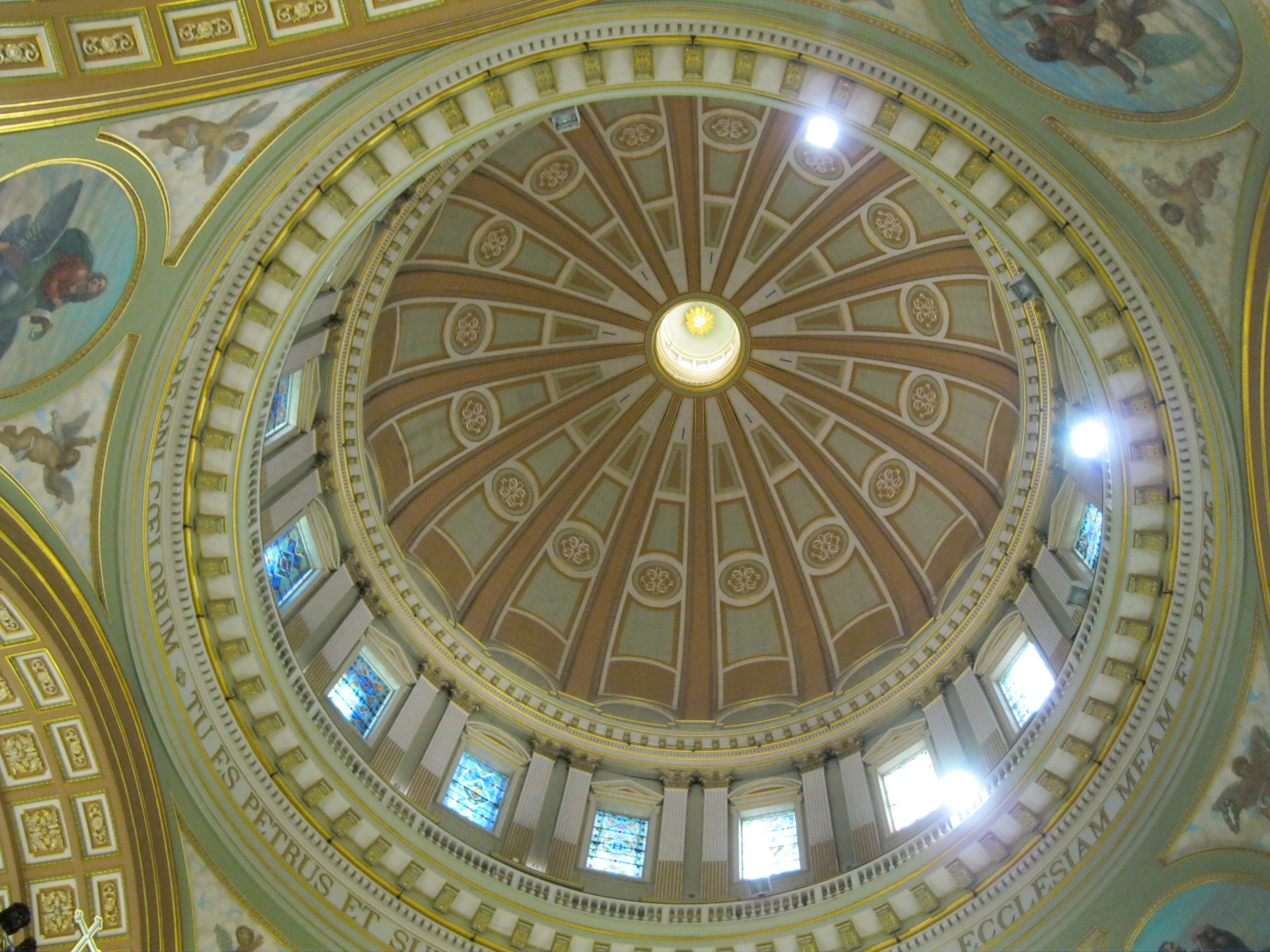
The cupola of the cathedral, which features text inside of it.

- Inside the cupola: "You are Peter and upon this rock I will build my Church. And the gates of hell shall not prevail against it. And I will give you the keys of the Kingdom of Heaven. (Latin: "Tu es Petrus, et super hanc petram aedificabo Ecclesiam meam, et portae inferi non praevalebunt adversus eam. Et tibi dabo claves Regni coelorum")
- In the chancel and apse: "And whatsoever you shall bind upon earth, it shall be bound also in Heaven: And whatsoever you shall loose on earth, it shall be loosed also in Heaven. Feed my sheep." (Latin: "Quodcumque ligaveris super terram, erit ligatum etin coelis: et quodcumque solveris super terram, erit solutum et in coelis.")
- At the base of the cupola: This text is fragmented into four physical sections. It is based on Revelation 4:8 from the Apocalypse and dedicated to the glory of God: "Holy, Holy, Holy, the Lord, who is, who was, and who is to come." (Latin: "Sanctus sanctus sanctus Dominus qui erat qui est qui venturus est.")

== See also ==
- Roman Catholic Marian churches
- List of cathedrals in Canada
- List of tallest domes
