= Congregation of the Sisters of Misericorde =

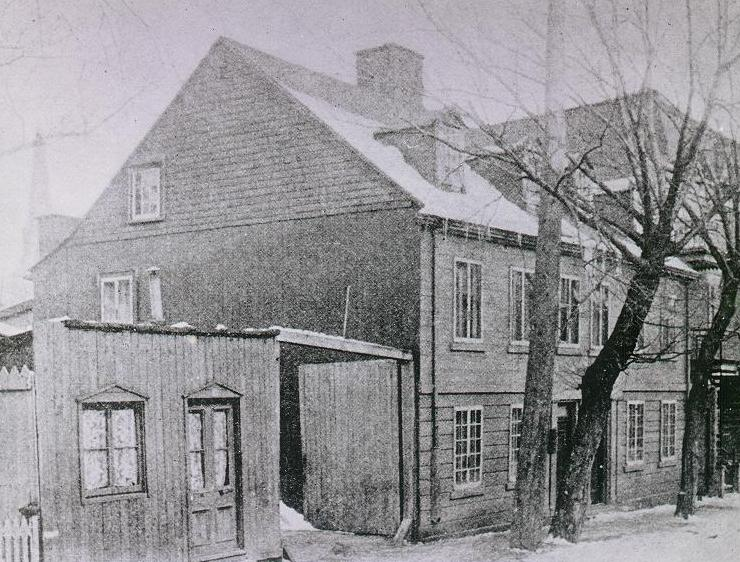
House on Wolfe Street in Montreal's Quebec Faubourg. In 1846, the Hospice de Sainte-Pelagie, founded by Rosalie Cadron-Jetté, moved to that location.

The Sisters of Misericorde were a religious congregation founded by Marie-Rosalie Cadron-Jetté (1794–1864) in Montreal, Canada East, in 1848 and was dedicated to nursing the poor and unwed mothers.

== History ==
Rosalie Cadron was born on a farm north of Montreal on January 27, 1794. Her mother was a mid-wife, a skill she passed on to her daughter. At age 17, she married 33-year-old Jean-Marie Jetté, and eventually bore eleven children, many of whom died very young. Madame Jetté, now widowed, began her work by giving refuge to a prostitute. In the early 1840s, Bishop Bourget asked Jetté if she would provide a safe, discreet, and welcoming home for expectant unmarried women. Madame agreed and provided shelter, not only in her own home, but in the homes of her adult children. From 1840 to 1845 Rosalie took in twenty-five women.

In 1846, Bourget asked if she would form a religious congregation. The congregation was founded in 1848 in Montreal, by Marie-Rosalie Cadron-Jetté to provide assistance to poor mothers and unfortunate girls. Eight sisters spent a year in religious formation, after which they took the traditional vows of poverty, chastity and obedience, together with a fourth vow to serve poor, single mothers. They then began formal medical training.

As Madame Jetté (Mother Mary of the Nativity) declined the role of Superior, Sister St. Jean de Chantal held this office. The institution was approved by Pope Pius IX on June 7, 1867.

The Misericordia Sisters endeavored to carry out their ministry discreetly, for the public was neither supportive of their cause nor charitable. The sisters were accused of "encouraging vice". According to Sulpician Father Éric Sylvestre, ""When food was scarce, Rosalie would fast so that the moms could eat. She was fond of saying that ‘Single mothers are the treasure of the house.’"

The sisters came to New York City in 1887, and the following year opened the New York Mothers' Home of the Sisters of Misericorde at 106 W.123rd St. They later purchased a large house at 531 E.86th St., partly with a loan from the Emigrant Industrial Savings Bank.

The order was particularly sensitive to the social stigma attached to a woman who had born an illegitimate child. The sisters perceived that, by precluding other employment, this often tended to force a woman into prostitution, and in some cases infanticide.

It seems very questionable that sentiment... which affixes upon illegitimate motherhood of a young girl the stigma of irreparable infamy, does not, in the majority of cases, accomplish more evil than good. To assert that by maternity out of marriage... a housemaid is hence unfit to care for children, and... should be turned forthwith, and without warning upon the streets, as the pitiless law of England today permits... is not merely false, but the underlying sentiment that inspires such action is both inexpedient and unjust.

— New York Mothers' Home, Annual Report, 1892

The sisters also conducted Magdalene asylums. Those who desired to remain in the home were placed under a special sister and were known as "Daughters of St. Margaret". They followed a certain rule of life but contracted no religious obligations. If they desired to remain in the convent, after a period of probation, they were allowed to eventually make the vows of the Magdalen order.

The congregation spread into Western Canada, establishing the Misericordia Community Hospital in Edmonton in 1900. The Sisters of Misericorde operated the hospital until the 1970s, when it became part of what is now Covenant Health, a Catholic healthcare provider operating 18 facilities across Alberta, in cooperation with Alberta Health Services.

In Toronto in 1914, the Misericordia Sisters started the St. Mary's Infant Home on Bond Street for maternity and infant care of single women and their children. This later moved to Jarvis Street, where they also began St. Mary's Hospital. Initially primarily a maternity hospital, its service was expanded in 1925, to include medical and surgical service as well. In 1956, both the hospital and the home were moved to Scarborough and opened as the Scarborough General Hospital and Rosalie Hall.

As of 2015 there were eighty Misericordia Sisters, who continue their mission assisted by lay collaborators.
