= Saint-Jacques Cathedral (Montreal) =

Coordinates: 45.5142°N 73.5610°W

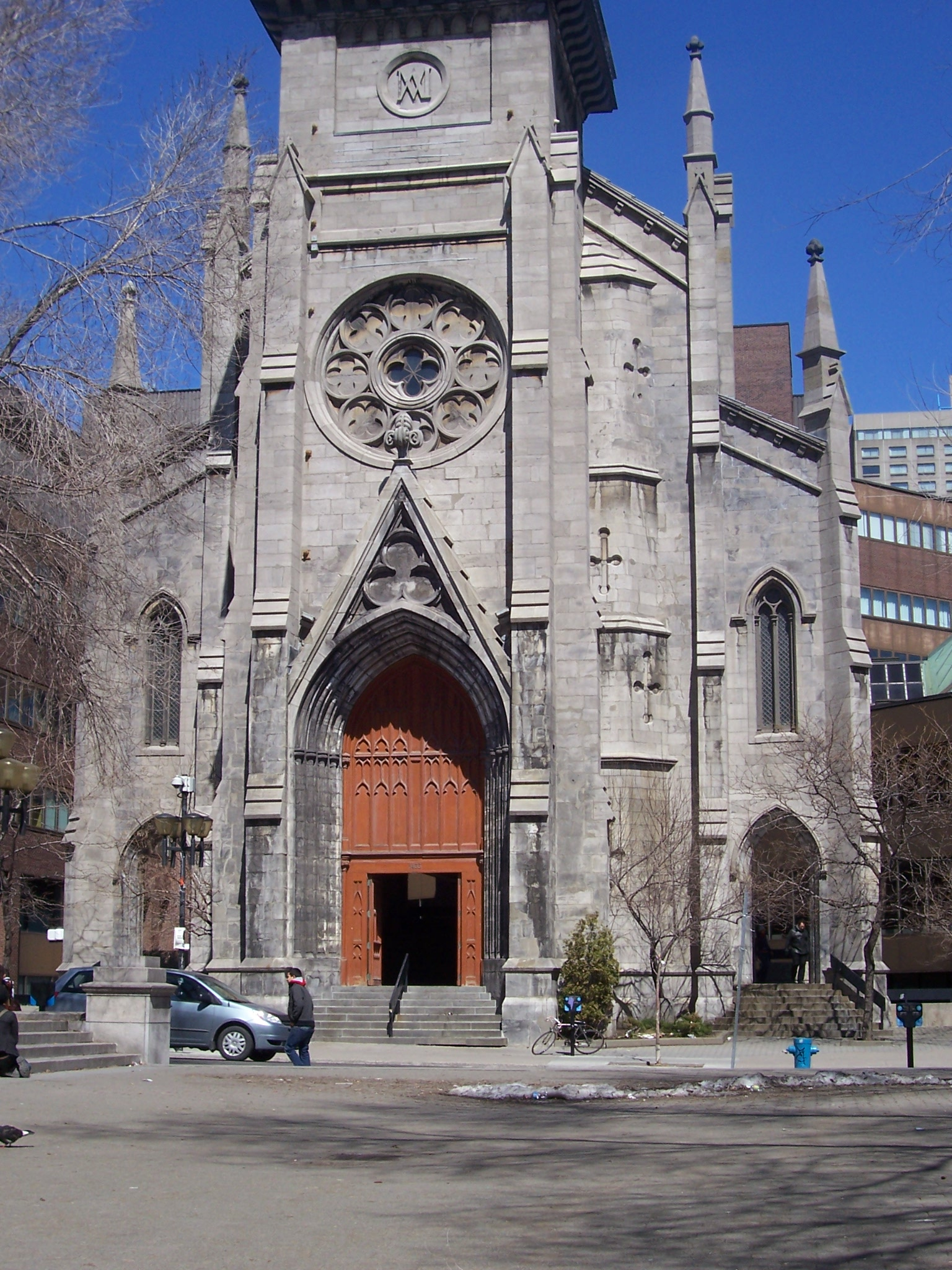
- Entrance to Saint-Jacques Cathedral, Montreal
- Saint-Jacques Cathedral
- Location: Corner of Saint-Denis and Sainte-Catherine Streets, Montreal
- Country: Canada
- Denomination: Catholic Church

History
- Dedication: St. James the Greater
- Consecrated: September 22, 1825 (original); 1857 (reconsecration)

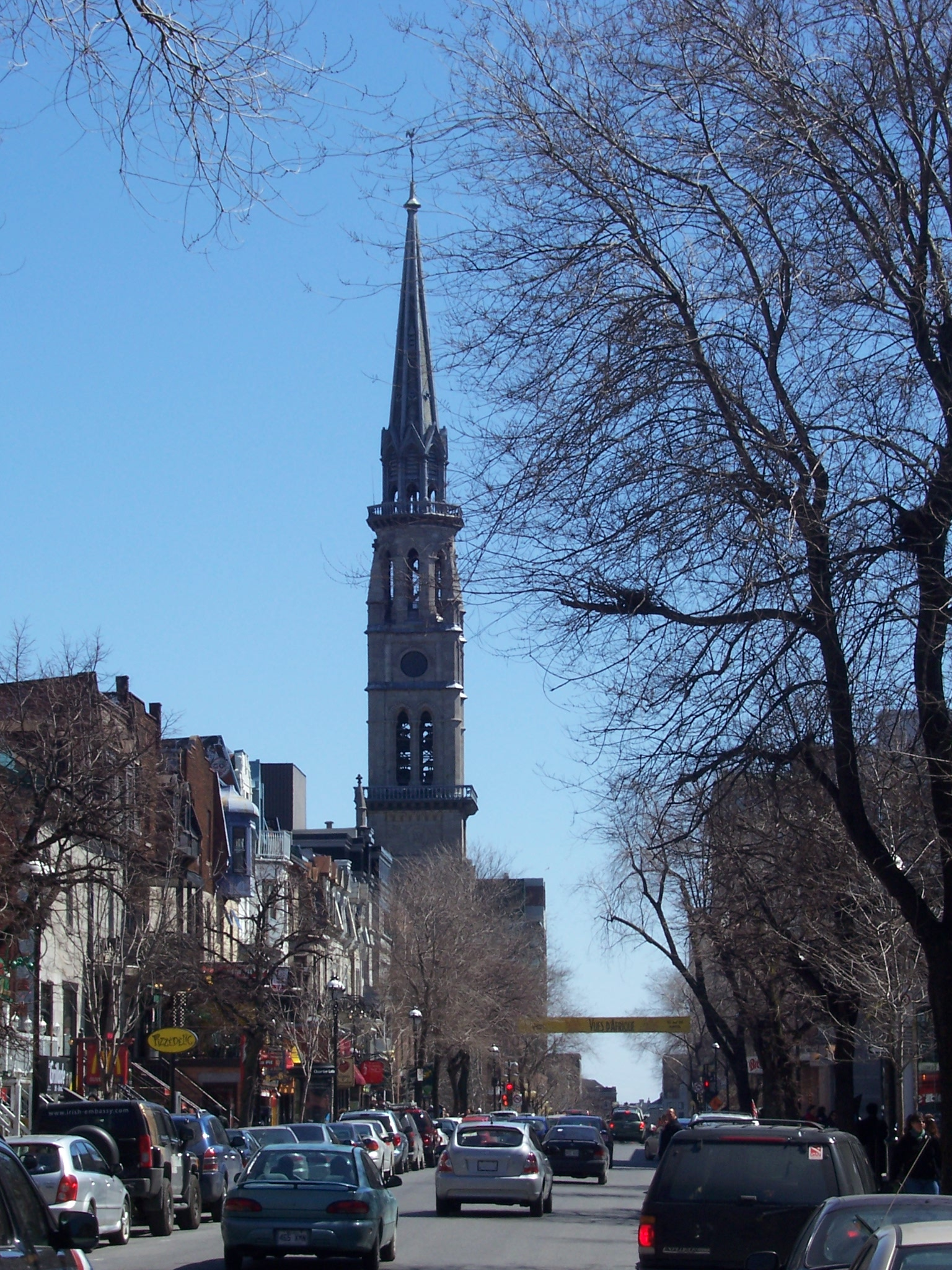
The cathedral tower.

Saint-Jacques Cathedral (Cathédrale Saint-Jacques) was the Roman Catholic cathedral in Montreal from 1825 to '52, named for St. James the Greater. From 1825 to '36, it was the seat of the auxiliary bishop of Quebec in Montreal. With the creation of the Roman Catholic Diocese of Montreal in 1836, it became the cathedral of the new diocese.

== History ==
Built at the corner of Saint-Denis and Sainte-Catherine streets, it was the city's first purpose-built cathedral. Its construction started in 1822 and its cornerstone was blessed on May 22, 1823. It was consecrated on September 22, 1825. The cathedral and the diocesan building were destroyed in the Great Fire of July 9, 1852, along with 1,200 other buildings.

At this point the diocese moved temporarily to the nearby chapel of the Sisters of Providence, before finally moving to a chapel on the current site of Mary, Queen of the World Cathedral, built in 1894, which is also dedicated to St. James.

The church was rebuilt by architect John Ostell for the Society of Saint-Sulpice as a parish church, and consecrated in 1857. It burned down the next year. It was rebuilt by Victor Bourgeau by 1860, with an 85-metre spire added in 1876, a golden weathervane in 1905, and a transept in 1889. It was burned out yet again in 1933 and quickly repaired by French monk and architect Paul Bellot. Its congregation's numbers seriously declining, the church was almost closed in 1965, but instead was designated as a pilgrimage centre and official Christian church of Expo 67. Uniquely, the church was connected directly to Berri–De Montigny metro station (today Berri–UQAM) by an underground city connection.

The patched-together building was purchased in 1973 by the Université du Québec à Montréal, and was demolished except for the spire and transept, classified as historic monuments. They were integrated into the university's Pavillon Judith-Jasmin.
