= Saint-Alphonse-de-Granby =

- Municipality
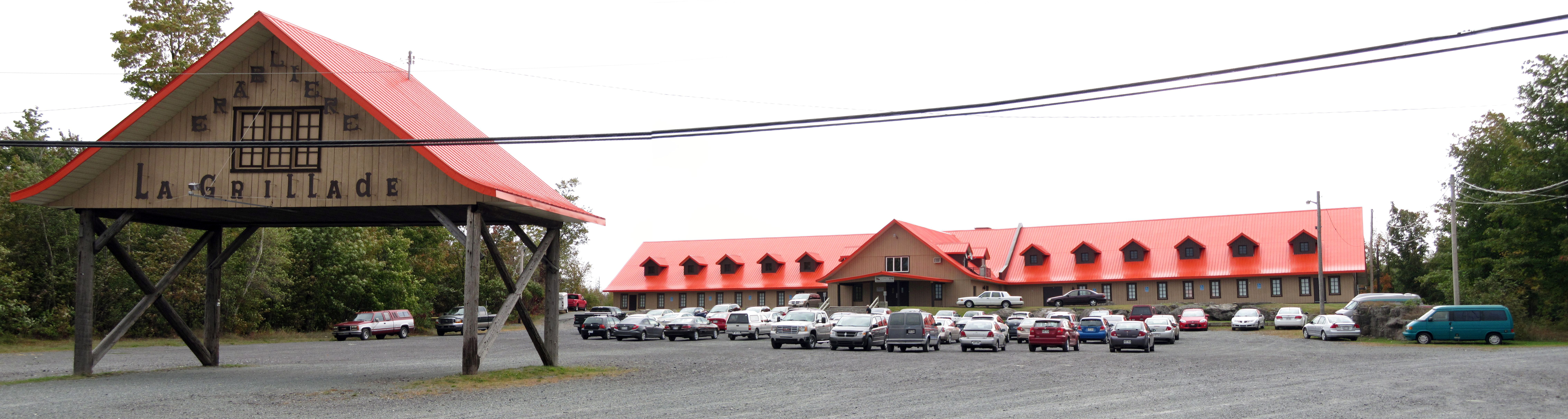

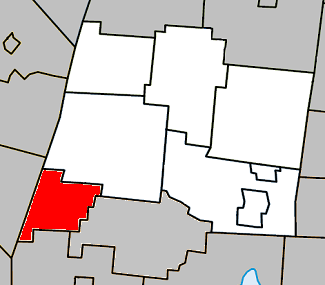
- Location within La Haute-Yamaska RCM.

- Location in southern Quebec.
- Coordinates: 45°20′N 72°49′W
- Country: Canada
- Province: Quebec
- Region: Estrie
- RCM: La Haute-Yamaska
- Constituted: December 30, 1890

Government
  - Mayor: Nathalie Gauvin
  - Federal riding: Shefford
  - Prov. riding: Granby

Area
  - Total: 50.20 km^{2} (19.38 sq mi)
  - Land: 49.93 km^{2} (19.28 sq mi)

Population (2011)
  - Total: 3,125
  - Density: 62.6/km^{2} (162/sq mi)
  - Pop 2006-2011: ▲7.1%
  - Dwellings: 1,124
- Time zone: UTC−05:00 (EST)
  - Summer (DST): UTC−04:00 (EDT)
- Postal code(s): J0E 2A0
- Area codes: 450 and 579
- Highways A-10: R-139
- Website: www.st-alphonse.qc.ca

Saint-Alphonse-de-Granby is a municipality in the Canadian province of Quebec, located within La Haute-Yamaska Regional County Municipality. The population as of the 2011 Canadian Census was 3,125.

Before October 25, 2008 it was known simply as Saint-Alphonse.

== Geography ==
Approximately halfway between Montreal and Sherbrooke, Saint-Alphonse-de-Granby's geography is mainly flat and its great fields have been exploited for agricultural ends (maize is most popularly grown) and for grazing for centuries now; this region distinguishes itself by the presence of rocky zones that form outcrops scattered randomly (some of this rock is exploited in the municipality's large private quarry, owned by Groupe Sintra), mixed forests are also found but are threatened by deforestation serving for residential and commercial expansion. The Yamaska River flows through Saint-Alphonse-de-Granby, many creeks and ditches empty themselves in it there and a bridge allows autoroute 10 to pass over its waters. The crossing of autoroute 10 (at exit 68) and route 139 happens on this territory near its border with the town of Granby.

=== Neighbouring municipalities ===
The neighbouring towns are Ange-Gardien, Granby, Bromont, Brigham, Cowansville, Farnham and East Farnham, there is also access to Saint-Paul-d'Abbotsford. The regional cycling network La route des champs traverses St-Alphonse, connecting it to many more towns via bike.

== Ecology ==
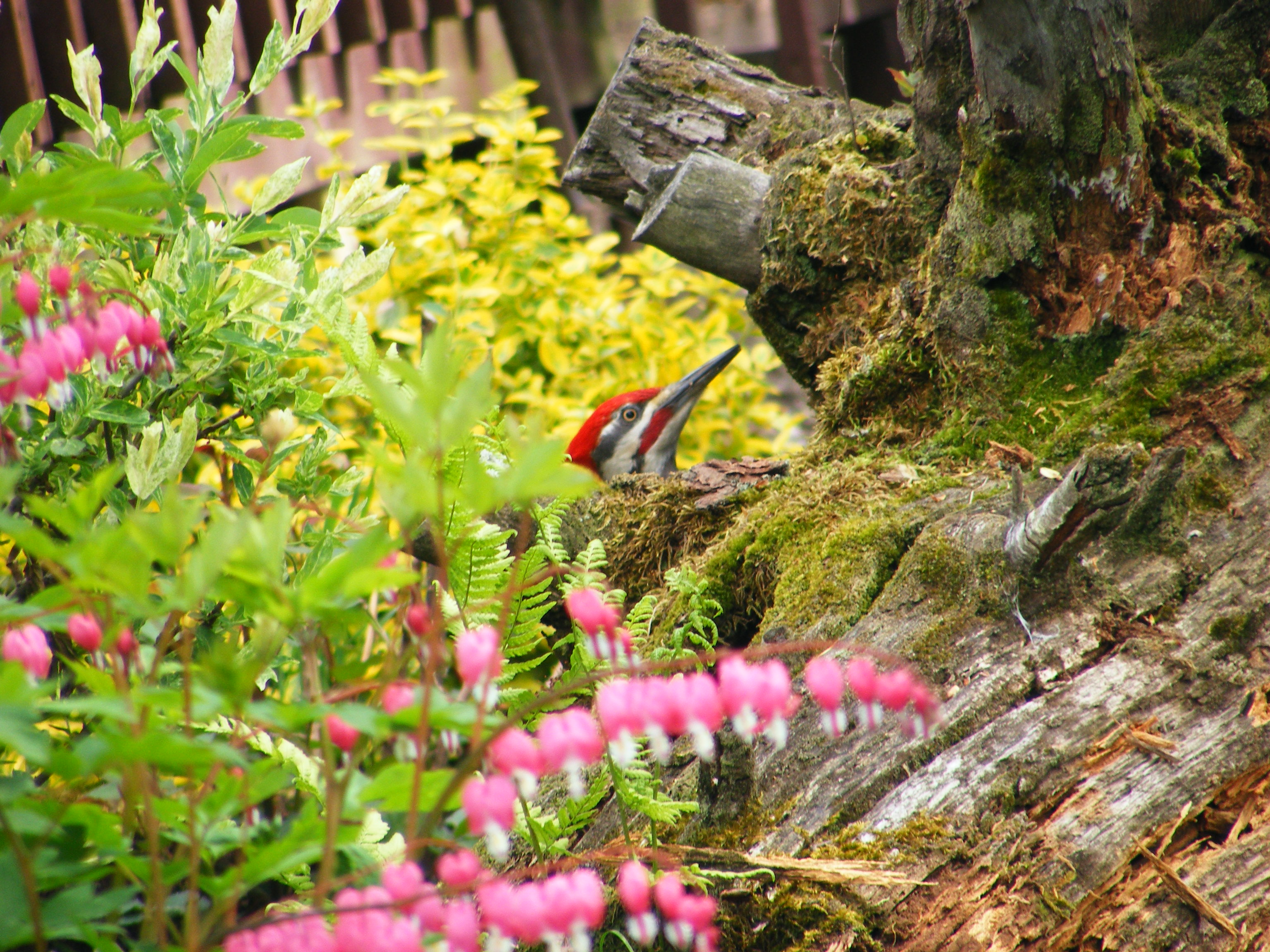
Pileated woodpecker is known to inhabit the forests of Saint-Alphonse-de-Granby.

Since it is a rural area with many fields, mixed forests, and marshlands, it supports a wide variety of animal and plant life. Some species, including coniferous trees and certain birds, fish, and mammals are active year-round. Others are present present or active only seasonally: some animals migrate or hibernate and many go dormant during the colder months. These seasonal species include in this group are several thousands of invertebrates, mammals, amphibians, birds, reptiles, grass, bushes, trees and fungi. Among the largest animals encountered here are great blue heron and moose. Fruit-bearing plants are abundant in the forested regions and alongside roads; the biodiversity supports activities such as hunting, trapping, herbalism, and the collecting of sap in the spring.

A great cohabitation is noticed among humans and animals in this municipality in regards to wild species and domestic species; this is due to wildlife becoming accustomed to human presence, raising of cattle and poultry has much importance, many ranches are also established, and the keeping of domestic cats make it a common lurker. Long has man and nature cohabited at this location before the arrival of Columbus in the Americas; the most important exploitation and the most damaging has happened from the arrival of the first French colonists that decided to farm the fields, up until the most recent development, seeing itself accelerated by modern residential, commercial and industrial growth. Many species of birds come to bird feeders and will live in residential neighbourhoods all year. Many residents upkeep and cultivate flora that is alien to Quebec, this results in the presence of exotic species growing in many neighbourhoods and natural spaces. The most tragic consequence for animals from the town is the construction of roads, which cost the lives of thousands of animals yearly.

Although its surface area is mostly reserved to the agricultural sector, the municipal council of St-Alphonse-de-Granby knows the importance of its green spaces and has inaugurated, circa 2000, a trail in a forest. For a long time municipal and private lands have held a network of dirt roads dedicate to ATV and snowmobiles transport.

== History ==
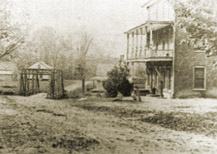
Saint-Alphonse-de-Granby c. 1900

In the 1800s, the region that would become Saint-Alphonse-de-Granby was colonized, but it would not known by that name until 1890. A one-room school was inaugurated on a land held by Georges D. Fuller in 1950 to educate the children of the area. In about 1855, Hungerford Mills, a sawmill, was constructed by Stephen Léonard Hungerford before it was sold to Joseph B. Hungerford, an American relative, who operated it for 15 years, until Thomas Ferguson took over; the mill was part of the Township of Granby.

Another mill (for flour) appeared before 1870, and it was around these two mills that the village of Saint-Alphonse slowly developed. Houses began to be built; the space was divided in four zones and many workers were hired to run roads across its territory.

Many of the workmen who built Saint-Alphonse also worked for the township of Granby.

The parish of Saint-Alphonse was decreed by Bishop Charles La Rocque of the Diocese of Saint-Hyacinthe, February 6, 1875. At the request of citizens from the area that a parson was present on Sundays for Mass. Abbot Charbonneau became the parson of Adamsville and Saint-Alphonse and lived three months under a locals roof while his clergy house near the church, which would be expanded in 1881. On December 30, 1890, the municipality of Saint-Alphonse became a distinct and independent municipality after a petition by the residents of the Saint-Alphonse du Canton de Granby parish. It was in the town's school that the first municipal council was elected on March 16, 1891, with six councillors and a mayor. Before the construction of the town hall in 1985, the council rented a room in the town school to hold its sessions.

The town's church was hit by lightning in 1897 and a fire began while the parson was Pierre A. Saint-Pierre. He limited damages with the help of twelve parishioners; and decided not to save the statue of Saint Anne on its altar. Although the fire left traces, the church was not entirely demolished. Bishop Moreau wrote in a letter that Saint Anne saved the building.

Around 1905, the town grew around a railroad and a train station (built by Onéisme Boisvert on rang Saint-Georges, the three floors having a general store, hotel, and the living quarters of the owner's family. Farmers brought their livestock on foot and got them on railroad cars. Local merchandise such as milk and lumber were all transported by train to be sold in Montreal. Later, the station was sold and moved and also served as a warehouse for products that arrived or left the town.

Between 1925 and 1929, bridges were restored in Saint-Alphonse, and the municipal council constructed a new bridge on 6e rang. Improvements were brought to the bridges on 3e rang (now rang Parent) and the town's bridge (a central pillar was added).

In the 1940s, Maurice Duplessis, the premier of Quebec implemented rural electrification, a teamwork of electricity co-operatives of Roxton Pond, Sainte-Cécile-de-Milton, Ange-Gardien, Saint-Alphonse, and Saint-Valérien implemented the project in the region. The co-ops created the Coopérative d'électricité de Saint-Valérien de Shefford, inaugurated in 1947, instead of competing. An airport was established on the land had belonged to Albert Lecours; it is sold to Granby three years later. It ceased with the arrival of Autoroute des Cantons, in 1962.

A new general store, which sold fresh meat, was opened in 1951, when Omer Bédard bought a three-floor building in the heart of the village. It was a popular place and provided access to all essential household items. It also had three apartments by 1957.

In 1963, the municipal council received the preliminary plans to Route 139, which would link the municipality to the highway at exit 38 (now 68), with a toll booth; construction lasted two years. The toll booth was converted after the tolls abolition in 1988; it was transformed in La maison du tourisme de l'Estrie.

The town hall was finally opened in 1986 at the intersection of Rue Principale and Route 139; the first public session was held in the new building that year May 16.

== Demographics ==
=== Population ===
Population trend:

Census	Population	Change (%)
2011	3,125	▲7.1%
2006	2,918	▲4.0%
2001	2,805	▼2.9%
1996	2,889	▲12.2%
1991	2,575	N/A

=== Language ===
Mother tongue language (2006)

Language	Population	Pct (%)
French only	2,720	93.31%
English only	110	3.77%
Both English and French	15	0.52%
Other languages	70	2.40%

== Notable people ==
From 1971 to 2012, Clément Choinière was mayor of Saint-Alphonse-de-Granby. He held the position 41 years (until his death) because he was the only mayoral candidate.

== See also ==
- List of municipalities in Quebec
