= Élisabeth Bergeron =

Canadian Religious sister and founder

Venerable Élisabeth Bergeron
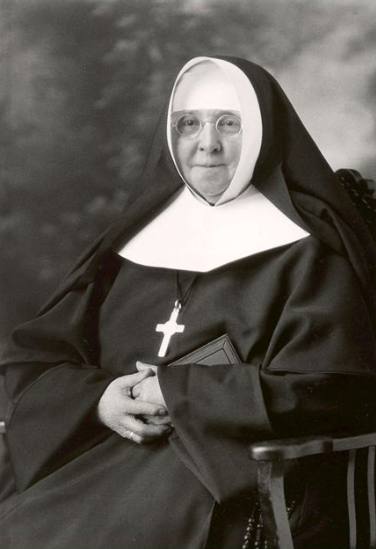
- Born: May 25, 1851; La Présentation, Quebec, Lower Canada
- Died: April 29, 1936 (aged 84); Saint-Hyacinthe, Quebec, Canada

Élisabeth Bergeron, religious name Saint-Joseph, (May 25, 1851 – April 29, 1936) was a Canadian religious sister who was the founder of the Sisters of Saint Joseph of Saint-Hyacinthe in 1877. She was the Mother superior of the congregation for the first two years.

Before entering the religious life, Bergeron worked in a cotton mill in the New England region of the United States and taught catechism in evening school to local impoverished children with no religious education. She was declared venerable by Pope John Paul II in 1996.

== Biography ==
Bergeron was born on May 25, 1851, in the small village of La Présentation, Quebec, Lower Canada, close to Saint-Hyacinthe. She was the fourth of eleven children of the farmer Théophile Bergeron and Basiliste Petit. After briefly going to the local rural area school located in La Présentation, where she learned to read since her parents were poor, Bergeron became interested in religion from an early age and did her first Communion in mid-1859 at the age of eight. She asked her parents if she could do her First Communion, but they refused and barred her from attending catechism classes. At age 14, Bergeron unsuccessfully wanted to join the Sisters of Saint Joseph of Saint-Hyacinthe since the Superior general thought her too young.

She and her family later relocated to the New England region of the United States due to the economic crisis, where they worked from 1865 to 1870. Bergeron initially resided in Brunswick, Maine, and Salem, Massachusetts, working in a cotton mill and teaching catechism at evening school in her home to local children who had no religious education since they were poor. She returned to Quebec with extra savings in March 1870. She was admitted to the Sisters Adorers of the Precious Blood in March 1871 but left in July that year since the Superior general advised her that she did not think her of having the vocation of a worshipper because of its strict rules. Bergeron briefly spent time with Montreal's Sisters of Miséricorde, but she decided to leave it following a few days of being a postulate due to dissatisfaction.

In 1875, she applied to join the Sisters of the Presentation of Mary but was rejected due to her lack of education. Bergeron became a member of the Third Order of Saint Dominic, and twice proposed the creation of a Dominican contemplative congregation to her diocese's bishop Louis-Zéphirin Moreau. He noted such a congregation was already existent in her local area, and suggested to her the formation of a teaching congregation instead. On September 12, 1877, Bergeron and three sisters (two of whom were teachers) established the Sisters of Saint Joseph of Saint-Hyacinthe in an abandoned schoolhouse in La Présentation. The school began admitting students divided into two groups of boys and girls on the morning of September 17, 1877. Death, the leaving and or illness of multiple candidates affected the congregation in its early years. Still, it survived on local congregation donations and received heavy criticism from the diocesan hierarchy.

For the first two years, Bergeron was Mother superior, but, on Bishop Moreau's advice, she relinquished the office to a more educated sister who was more able to deal with the school boards. Bergeron made her perpetual vows on March 19, 1880.

In 1911, Bergeron visited the Western Canadian missions in Lorette, Manitoba, and Marieval, Saskatchewan, which were established in 1901. The congregation also extended into Ontario and New Hampshire. On April 29, 1936, Bergeron died in Saint-Hyacinthe. She was buried in the mausoleum of the Cathédrale Saint-Hyacinthe-le-Confesseur Cemetery.

== Legacy ==
The Elisabeth Bergeron Centre was opened in her name in September 1969 to promote the cause of her beatification. Bergeron was declared venerable on January 12, 1996, by Pope John Paul II, after the Congregation for the Causes of Saints gave recognition of her heroic virtue, "especially her humility, her understanding, and love of the Church and her submission to the will of God." Some buildings in the Saint-Hyacinthe area are named after her, and the "Elisabeth Wednesdays" that took place on nine successive weekends from 2005 to 2009 were held to promote her work.
