= Alexis-Xyste Bernard =

Canadian bishop

- Bishop of Saint-Hyacinthe
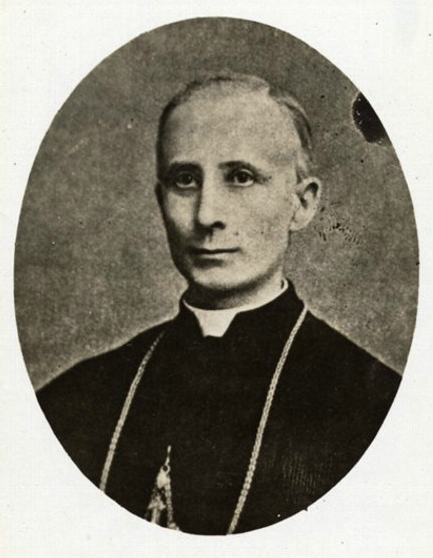
- Church: Catholic Church
- Diocese: Saint-Hyacinthe
- Installed: 1905
- Term ended: 1923
- Predecessor: Maxime Decelles
- Successor: Fabien-Zoël Decelles

Orders
- Ordination: October 1, 1871
- Consecration: February 15, 1906

Personal details
- Born: December 29, 1847 Beloeil, Canada East
- Died: June 17, 1923 (aged 75)

Alexis-Xyste Bernard (December 29, 1847 – June 17, 1923) was Bishop of St. Hyacinthe, Canada.

The Institute of the Sisters of St. Joseph of St. Hyacinthe, founded by Louis-Zéphirin Moreau, owes to him their organization, and formation as a teaching body.

== Life ==
Bernard made his classical and theological studies under the Sulpician Fathers in Montreal, and was ordained priest 1 October 1871. After a year as curate he became successively President of Sorel College, Canon of the Cathedral, Archdeacon, Secretary for the diocese, Vicar-General, Provost of the Chapter, and Prothonotary Apostolic. After the death of Bishop Moreau, in 1901, Bernard was continued in the office of Vicar-General by Bishop Maxime Decelles, and, when the latter died, in 1905, was elected Vicar-Capitular.

He declined the See of St. Hyacinth on the plea of his enfeebled health, until he received from Pope Pius X a peremptory order to accept. He was consecrated 15 February 1906.

== Works ==
Besides "Synodal Decrees", and a summary of the "Clerical Conference", Bernard edited the "Pastoral Letters" of the bishops of the diocese, in nine volumes.
