= Sisters of Saint Joseph of Saint-Hyacinthe =

The Sisters of Saint Joseph of Saint-Hyacinthe (Soeurs de Saint-Joseph de Saint-Hyacinthe) are a female religious congregation teaching institute established under Pontifical right.

== Historical background ==
The congregation was founded on September 12, 1877 in La Providence (a municipality which merged in 1976 with Saint-Hyacinthe, Quebec) by the Blessed Louis-Zéphirin Moreau (1824-1901), bishop of the diocese of Saint-Hyacinthe, and the venerable Élisabeth Bergeron.

During the 1880s, the sisters established their motherhouse in Saint-Hyacinthe. In the 20th century, they established houses in Western Canada (1901), New England (1926), Lesotho (1938), Brazil (1958), Senegal (1970), Haiti (1990) and Chad (1994). The Institute received the Decretum laudis on December 7, 1953, and its religious constitutions were finally approved by the Holy See on March 19, 1962.

== Activities and dissemination ==
The sisters devote themselves mainly to teaching children in primary schools.

They are present in:

- The Americas: Canada, Brazil, United States, Haiti.
- Africa: South Africa, Lesotho, Senegal, Chad.

The parent house is in Saint-Hyacinthe, Quebec.

At the end of 2008, the congregation had 355 religious members in 34 houses.

In 2017, the congregation had 249 sisters in 20 houses.
