= Drainville =

Drainville is a surname. Notable people with the surname include:

- Bernard Drainville (born 1963), Canadian politician, broadcaster and journalist
- Dennis Drainville (born 1954), Canadian bishop, educator and politician
- Gérard Drainville (1930–2014), Canadian bishop
- Martin Drainville (born 1964), Canadian actor and comedian
