= Yedukameri =

Green Route
- Location: Hassan and South Canara, Karnataka, India

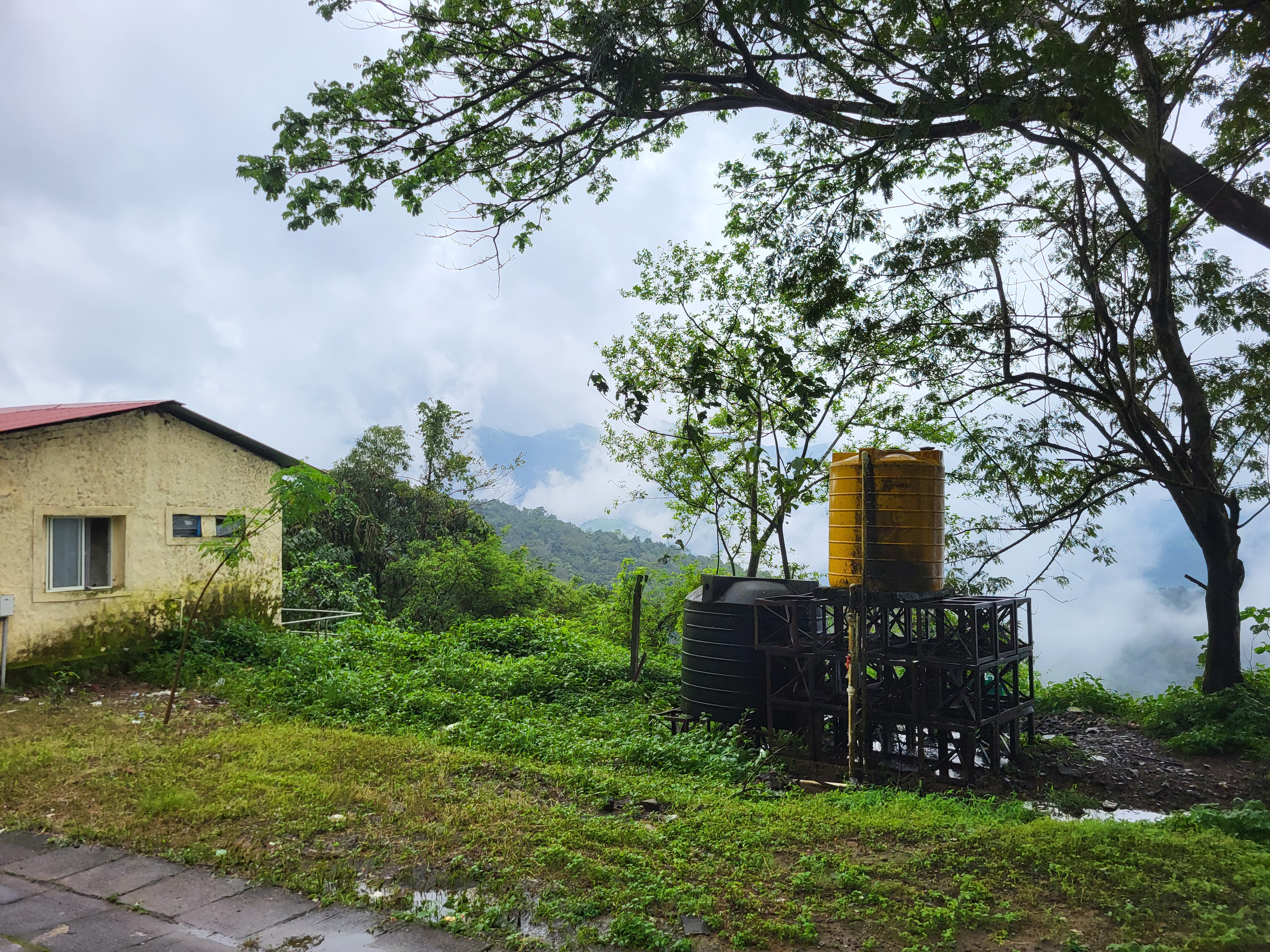
Yedekumeri railway station (2024)

Yedukameri or Yedakumeri is a location in Karnataka state of India. It occupies a position amidst the thick western Ghats jungle.

Yedukameri in Kannada means "above the hill". It has a railway station between Sakleshpur and Subramanya. Trekkers enjoy this spot and it is said to be the best trekking spot in Karnataka. Trekkers walk along the railway track known as Green Route from Donigal to Yedukameri. On the way, there are tunnels stretching up to 600 metres and long railway bridges. These two factors makes this trek very adventurous. The walk from Yedukameri to Bangalore-Mangalore highway along the jungle crosses two streams and elephants may be seen.
