= Diocese of Saint-Hyacinthe =

Catholic ecclesiastical territory

Coordinates: 45.6167°N 72.9500°W

Diocese of Saint-Hyacinthe Dioecesis Sancti Hyacinthi Diocése de Saint-Hyacinthe
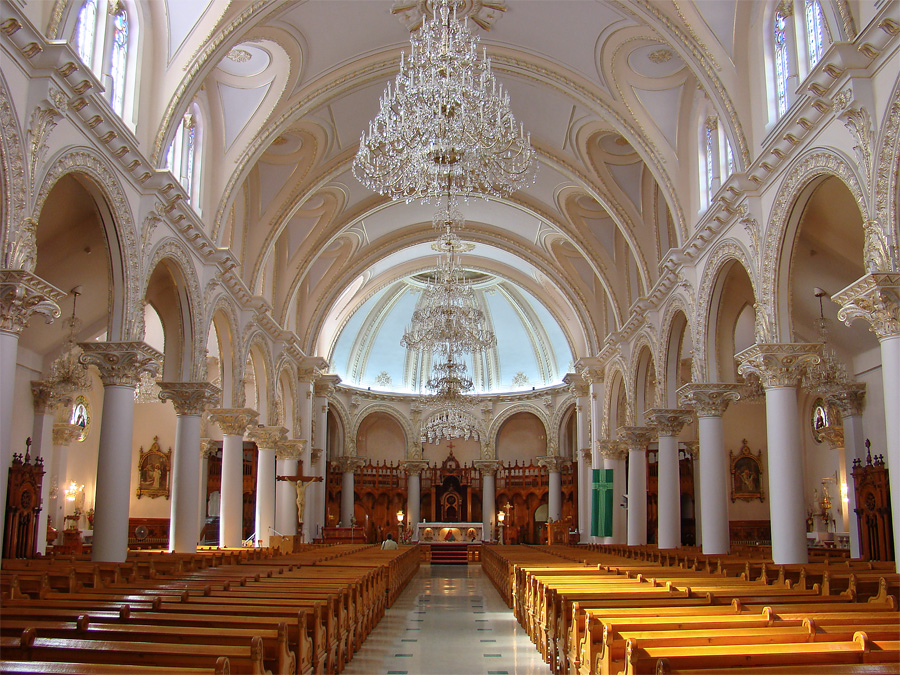
- Cathedral of Saint-Hyacinthe the Confessor

Location
- Country: Canada
- Ecclesiastical province: Quebec

Statistics
- Population: Total; Catholics: 380,946; 363,804 (95.5%)
- Parishes: 88

Information
- Denomination: Roman Catholic
- Rite: Roman Rite
- Established: 8 June 1852
- Cathedral: Cathedral of Ste. Hyacinthe the Confessor
- Secular priests: 224

Current leadership
- Pope: Leo XIV
- Bishop: Christian Rodembourg, M.S.A.
- Metropolitan Archbishop: Guy Boulanger
- Bishops emeritus: François Lapierre

Website
- ecdsh.org

The Roman Catholic Diocese of Saint-Hyacinthe is a Latin rite suffragan of the Metropolitan Archdiocese of Sherbrooke in Quebec, (predominantly francophone) Canada.

Its cathedral episcopal see is Cathédrale Saint-Hyacinthe-le-Confesseur, dedicated to diocesan patron saint Hyacinth the Confessor (of Poland), in Saint-Hyacinthe, Quebec.
There is also a decommissioned former Cathedral: now Église Saint-Matthieu, dedicated to the Evangelist Matthew, in Beloeil, Quebec.

== History ==
The Diocese of Saint-Hyacinthe was erected 8 June 1852 from territory split off from the then Diocese of Montréal and the Metropolitan Archdiocese of Québec. John Charles Prince was the first Bishop of St. Hyacinthe. At first, the old seminary building was used as a cathedral and residence; unfortunately, it burned in May, 1854. The bishop built a new residence as well as a chapel-cathedral. Bishop Prince showed untiring activity, founding twenty new parishes, establishing several missions, and in 1853 introducing from France the Sisters of the Presentation of Mary. The Sisters of Charity of the Hôpital Général of Montreal arrived in Saint-Hyacinthe in 1840 and soon established the Hotel-Dieu to provide health care for the community. In 1896, they became a separate pontifical congregation, the "Sisters of Charity of Saint-Hyacinthe". Bishop Prince died on 5 May, 1860, at the age of fifty-six.

Joseph La Rocque, had administered the diocese during the prolonged illness of Bishop Prince, and succeeded as the second bishop in 1860. During his tenure, the contemplative institute Sisters Adorers of the Precious Blood was founded in Saint-Hyacinthe by Catherine Aurelia Caouette. Eventually, feeling overwhelmed by the responsibilities, La Rocque resigned in 1865. He was followed by his cousin, Charles La Rocque, a man with rare financial ability. He closed the episcopal palace and relocated with his staff to the Église Saint-Matthieu-de-Belœil, where he combined the duties of bishop and pastor. La Rocque effectively reduced the cathedral debt and placed the diocese on a satisfactory money basis. In 1873, the Dominicans make their first foundation in Canada at Saint-Hyacinthe, where they establish a novitiate. The subject of a foundation was first broached by Bishop Prince, but the French superiors felt at that time that their own establishment was still too new. In 1874 Saint-Hyacinthe lost territory to the newly erected Diocese of Sherbrooke as did the Archdiocese of Québec and the Diocese of Trois Rivières.

Louis-Zéphirin Moreau became bishop in 1875. He founded the Sisters of St. Joseph of St. Hyacinthe. The Marist Brothers came from France and established their novitiate in the diocese. Maxime Decelles was appointed coadjutor to Moreau in 1893. The elderly Moreau left external administration and tiring visits to Decelles, who became bishop upon Moreau's death in 1901.Moreau was beatified in 1987.

Alexis-Xyste Bernard served as vicar-general for both bishops Moreau and Decelles; he succeeded Decelles in 1905.

== Statistics ==
As per 2017, it pastorally served 336,445 Catholics on 3,448 km^{2} in 83 parishes with 185 priests (93 diocesan, 92 religious), 30 deacons, 605 lay religious (122 brothers, 483 sisters) and 43 lay pastoral workers.

== Bishops ==
=== Episcopal ordinaries ===
(all Roman Rite Canadians)

Suffragan Bishops of Saint-Hyacinthe

- John Charles Prince (1852.06.08 – death 1860.05.05), previously Titular Bishop of Martiria (1844.07.05 – 1852.06.08) as Coadjutor Bishop of Diocese of Montréal (Quebec, Canada) (1844.07.05 – 1852.06.08)
- Joseph La Rocque (1860.06.22 – 1866.02.04), previously Titular Bishop of Cydonia (1852.07.06 – 1860.06.22) as Coadjutor Bishop of above Montréal (Canada) (1852.07.06 – 1860.06.22); emeritus as Titular Bishop of Germanicopolis (1867.01.15 – death 1887.11.18)
- Charles La Rocque (1866.03.20 – death 1875.07.25)
- Blessed Louis-Zéphirin Moreau (1875.11.19 – death 1901.05.24), no other prelature
- Maxime Decelles (1901.05.24 – death 1905.07.07), succeeding as previous Titular Bishop of Druzipara (1893.01.14 – 1901.05.24) and Coadjutor Bishop of Saint-Hyacinthe (1893.01.14 – 1901.05.24)
- Alexis-Xyste Bernard (1905.12.16 – death 1923.06.17), no other prelature
- Fabien-Zoël Decelles (1924.03.24 – death 1942.11.27), no other prelature
  - Auxiliary Bishop: Joseph-Louis-Aldée Desmarais (1931.01.30 – 1939.06.22), Titular Bishop of Ruspæ (1931.01.30 – 1939.06.22); later Bishop of Amos (Canada) (1939.06.22 – retired 1968.10.31), emeritus as Titular Bishop of Medeli (1968.10.31 – resigned 1970.12.08), died 1979
- Arthur Douville (1942.11.27 – retired 1967.06.13), succeeding as former Titular Bishop of Vita (1939.11.30 – 1942.11.27) and Auxiliary Bishop of Saint-Hyacinthe (1939.11.30 – 1942.03), Coadjutor Bishop of Saint-Hyacinthe (1942.03 – 1942.11.27); emeritus as Titular Bishop of Zattara (1967.06.13 – resigned 1970.11.26), died 1986
  - Auxiliary Bishop: Gaston Hains (1964.08.28 – 1967.06.13), Titular Bishop of Belesasa (1964.08.28 – 1968.10.31); next Coadjutor Bishop of Amos (Canada) (1967.06.13 – 1968.10.31), succeeding as Bishop of Amos (1968.10.31 – resigned 1978.04.19), died 1986

BIOS TO ELABORATE

- Albert Sanschagrin, O.M.I. (1967.06.13 – retired 1979.07.18)
- Louis-de-Gonzague Langevin, M. Afr. (1979.07.18 – retired 1998.04.07)
- François Lapierre, P.M.E. (7 April 1998 - 29 June 2017), previously Superior General of Society of Foreign Missions (P.M.E.) (1991.05.28 – 1998.04.07).
- Christian Rodembourg, M.S.A.(born Belgium) (2017.06.29 – ...).

=== Coadjutor bishops ===
- Maxime Decelles (1893-1901)
- Arthur Douville (1942)

=== Auxiliary bishops ===
- Joseph Louis Aldée Desmarais (1931-1939)
- Arthur Douville (1940-1942), appointed Coadjutor here
- Gaston Hains (1964-1967), appointed Coadjutor Bishop of Amos, Québec
- Louis-de-Gonzague Langevin, M. Afr. (1974-1979), appointed Bishop here

=== Other priest of this diocese who became bishop ===
- Raymond Saint-Gelais, appointed Auxiliary Bishop of Saint-Jérôme, Québec in 1980

== See also ==
- List of Catholic dioceses in Canada

== Sources and external links ==
- GCatholic, with Google map - data for all sections
- Diocese of Saint-Hyacinthe site (in French)
- "Diocese of Saint-Hyacinthe". Catholic-Hierarchy.
