= Caouette =

Caouette is a surname. Notable people with the surname include:

- Armand Caouette (1945–2010), Canadian politician
- Catherine Aurelia Caouette (1833–1905), Canadian nun
- Gilles Caouette (1940–2009), Canadian politician
- Jonathan Caouette (born 1973), American film director
- Réal Caouette (1917–1976), Canadian politician
