= Decelles =

Decelle, Decelles or DeCelles may refer to:

- Maxime Decelles (1849–1905), a Canadian bishop of Saint-Hyacinthe at Canada
- Decelles building of HEC Montreal (Hautes Études Commerciales), Montreal, in Quebec
