= Marie Joseph Spiritual Center =

Former religious retreat on Biddeford, Maine

Coordinates: 43°26′38″N 70°20′59″W

The Marie Joseph Spiritual Center was a religious retreat center in Biddeford, Maine run by the Sisters of the Presentation of Mary. Located in the summer colony of Biddeford Pool, the center operated from 1978 until closing in June 2023. The building in which the center operated had previously been utilized as the Evans Hotel, Ocean View Hotel and as a young women's boarding school known as Marie Joseph Academy prior to being opened as the Marie Joseph Spiritual Center. During its time as a hotel, it included 48 rooms and was operated by the Evans family.
