= Belesasa =

Ancient North African city and titular see

Belesasa was an ancient city and former bishopric in Roman North Africa, which only remains a Latin Catholic titular see.

== History ==
Belesasa, was among the cities of sufficient importance in the Roman province of Numidia to become a suffragan diocese of the Metropolitan of Carthage, in the papal sway, but faded so completely, plausibly at the seventh century advent of Islam, that its exact location, now in Algeria wasn't even found.

Its only historically documented incumbent, Servus, was among the Catholic bishops convoked to a Council of Carthage in 484 by king Huneric of the Vandal Kingdom, and probably exiled likes his colleagues, unlike their schismatic Donatist counterparts (none reported for Belesasa)

== Titular see ==
The diocese was nominally restored in 1933 as Latin titular bishopric of Belesasa (Latin = Curiate Italian) / Belesasen(sis) (Latin adjective).

It has had the following incumbents, so far of the fitting episcopal (lowest) rank :

- Gaston Hains (1964.08.28 – 1968.10.31), first as Auxiliary Bishop of Diocese of Saint-Hyacinthe (Canada) (1964.08.28 – 1967.06.13), then as Coadjutor Bishop of Amos (Canada) (1967.06.13 – succession 1968.10.31); next Bishop of Amos (1968.10.31 – retired 1978.04.19), died 1986
- Jesús Humberto Velázquez Garay (1983.02.10 – 1988.04.28) as Auxiliary Bishop of Diocese of Culiacán (Mexico) (1983.02.10 – 1988.04.28); later Bishop of Celaya (Mexico) (1988.04.28 – retired 2003.07.26), died 2003

BIOS TO ELABORATE

- Héctor Miguel Cabrejos Vidarte, Friars Minor (O.F.M.) (1988.06.20 – 1998.03.07)
- Joseph Angelo Grech (1998.11.27 – 2001.03.08)
- Joachim Mbadu Kikhela Kupika (2001.05.21 – 2019.03.12), Bishop emeritus of Boma (Congo-Kinshasa)
- Pascual Limachi Ortiz (2019.04.16 – 2021.02.10), Appointed Prelate of Corocoro
- Pius Sin Hozel (2021.05.22 – ...)

== See also ==
- List of Catholic dioceses in Algeria

== Sources and external links ==
- GCatholic

Bibliography

- Pius Bonifacius Gams, Series episcoporum Ecclesiae Catholicae, Leipzig 1931, p. 464
- Stefano Antonio Morcelli, Africa christiana, Volume I, Brescia 1816, p. 99
- Auguste Audollent, lemma 'Belesasensis' in Dictionnaire d'Histoire et de Géographie ecclésiastiques, vol. VII, 1934, col. 516
