= Maxime Decelles =

- Bishop of Saint-Hyacinthe
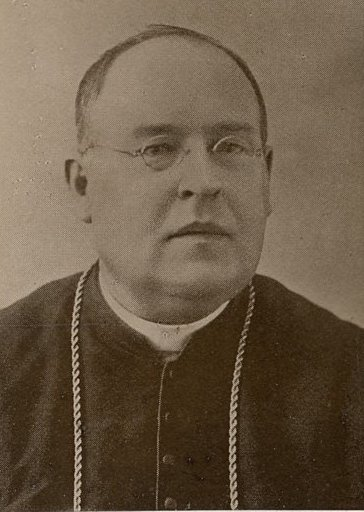
- Diocese: Saint-Hyacinthe
- Installed: 1901
- Term ended: 1905
- Predecessor: Louis-Zéphirin Moreau
- Successor: Alexis-Xyste Bernard
- Other post: Coadjutor Bishop of Saint-Hyacinthe (1893-1901)

Personal details
- Born: 30 April 1849
- Died: 7 July 1905 (aged 56)

Maxime Decelles (30 April 1849 – 7 July 1905) was a Canadian Roman Catholic bishop. He was the 5th Bishop of Saint-Hyacinthe.

== Life ==
Maxime Decelles was born in Saint-Damase-sur-Yamaska, Saint-Hyacinthe county, April 30, 1849 to François and Apolline Coderre-Lacaillade Decelles. He was educated at Saint-Hyacinthe Seminary and ordained at Iberville July 21, 1872 by Bishop Charles La Rocque.

He was first assigned to Saint-Denis, and then Beloeil. In 1875, Bishop Louis-Zéphirin Moreau made Decelles titular canon of the Cathédrale Saint-Hyacinthe-le-Confesseur. He resigned the canonry in 1880 and assumed charge of the church at Saint-Roch-de-Richelieu. In 1889, he was assigned to the larger parish of St. Peter's at Sorel.

Decelles was appointed coadjutor to Moreau and consecrated titular bishop of Druzipara on 9 March 1893. He continued as pastor at St. Peter's, and in 1898, on the Feast of St. Anne (July 26), led a pilgrimage by steamer from Sorel to the shrine of Sainte-Anne-de-Beaupré.

The elderly Moreau left external administration and tiring visits to his coadjutor. He died on 24 May 1901 and Decelles succeeded as bishop.
