= St. Hyacinth's Cathedral =

- Cathédrale Saint-Hyacinthe-le-Confesseur
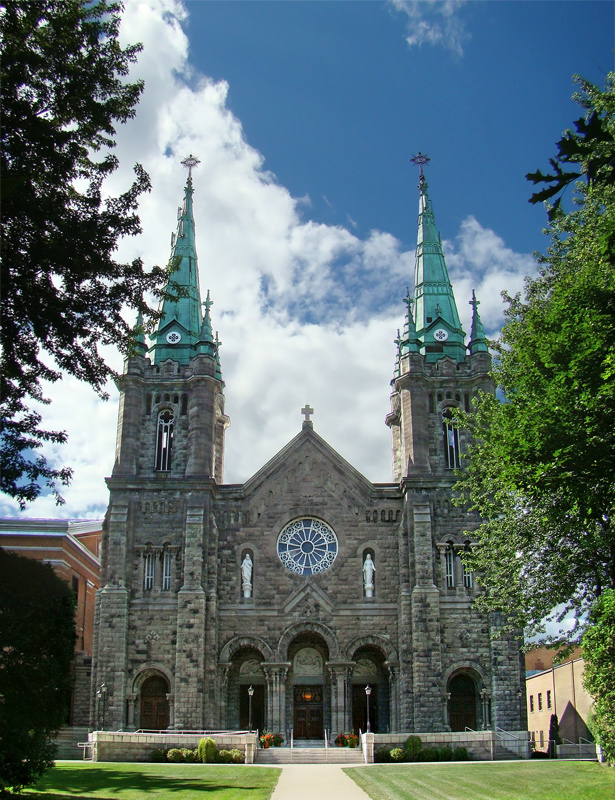
- St. Hyacinth's Cathedral
- 45°37′29″N 72°56′57″W
- Location: Saint-Hyacinthe; Quebec
- Country: Canada
- Denomination: Roman Catholic Church

The Cathedral of St. Hyacinth the Confessor (French: Cathédrale Saint-Hyacinthe-le-Confesseur), located in Saint-Hyacinthe, Quebec, is the cathedral of the Roman Catholic Diocese of Saint-Hyacinthe.

The cathedral church, named in honour of St. Hyacinth of Poland, was built in 1880 in the Romanesque Revival style.

== History ==
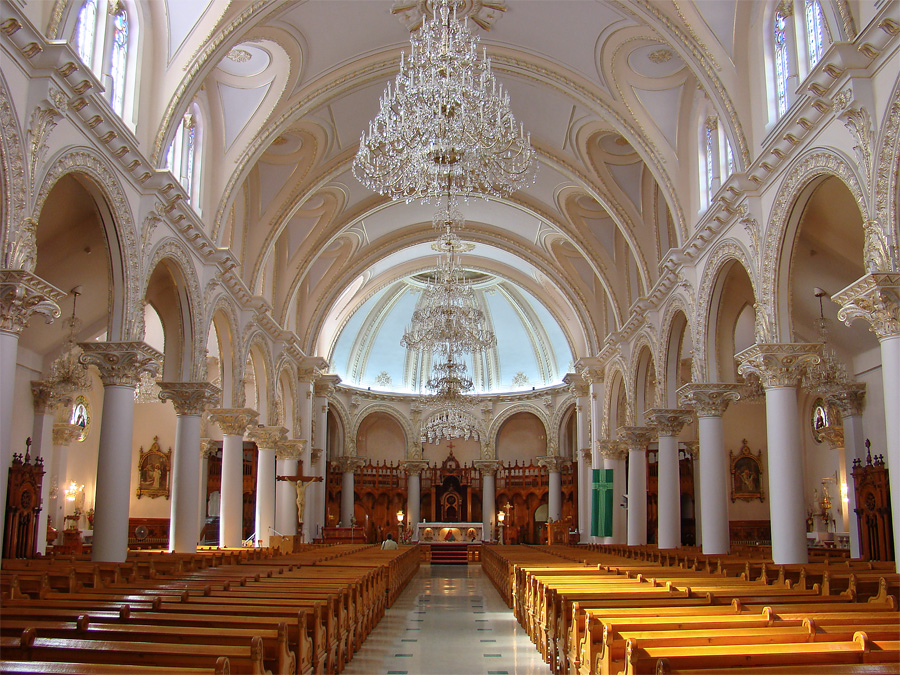
Interior

The Diocese of Saint-Hyacinthe was erected 8 June 1852. Jean-Charles Prince, former coadjutor of Montreal, was named the first bishop. At first, the old seminary building was used as pro-cathedral and clergy house. A red brick chapel-cathedral was hastily built near the Hôtel-Dieu. During the funeral of Bishop Prince in 1860, the pro-cathedral began to show signs of weakness under the weight of the crowd.

Charles La Rocque became bishop in March 1866. Realizing that the debts of his cathedral called for unusual measures, he closed the episcopal palace and retired with his staff to Saint-Mathieu-de-Beloeil, where he combined the duties of bishop and pastor.

The construction of the current building was undertaken by Bishop Louis-Zéphirin Moreau, with the money saved by the economy of his predecessor. Its architect was Adolphe Lévesque, who fulfilled a contract for $50,000. It was named in honour of Dominican confessor St. Hyacinth (Saint Hyacinthe). Moreau is buried at the cathedral.

In September 2022, Bishop Christian Rodembourg presided over the formal dedication of the cathedral.

== Architecture ==
Lévesque designed the building in the Romanesque style. The facade proved too heavy for the clay soil on which it rests. A restoration took place in 1908 by the architects Maurice Perrault and Albert Mesnard. They secured the foundation and replaced the original square towers with two slender bell towers. The Stations of the Cross date from 1913.

A second renovation in 1942 removed the side balconies and installed a new baptistery. After the Second Vatican Council various elements of the choir were rearranged; Czechoslovak glass chandeliers were hung, replacing neon light fixtures. In 1975, the tomb of Bishop Moreau was installed in the left transept of the cathedral. Additional repairs were made in 1998–1999 to the forecourt and masonry work.

=== Interior ===
The painting in the vault of the choir which represents the Eternal Father is by a work of Ozias Leduc. In 1853, by Mgr Ignace Bourget, bishop of Montreal, presented Saint-Hyacinthe with a harmonium that was used until the installation of the Casavant organ, opus 8, in 1885.

== See also ==
- Catholic Church in Canada
