= Joseph F. Stedman =

American priest and writer

The Right Reverend Monsignor Joseph Stedman
- Director of the Confraternity of the Precious Blood
- Church: Latin Church
- Other post: Chaplain of the Monastery of the Precious Blood in Brooklyn

Orders
- Ordination: May 1921
- Rank: Monsignor

Personal details
- Born: Joseph F. Stedman; 11 March 1898 Brooklyn, New York, United States
- Died: 23 March 1946 (age 48) Columbia-Presbyterian Medical Center
- Denomination: Catholic
- Parents: Joseph and Ellen Stedman
- Profession: Author and writer
- Education: St. Joseph's Parochial School; St. Francis Preparatory School; St. Francis College; Fordham College

Joseph F. Stedman (March 11, 1898 – March 23, 1946) was a well-known American priest and author of books about Catholicism.

== Biography ==
Joseph Stedman was born to Joseph and Ellen Stedman in Brooklyn, New York, and was one of five children. After attending St. Joseph's Parochial School and St. Francis Preparatory School, he entered St. Francis College in Brooklyn. Still, he left after his junior year and entered Fordham College, where he received his Bachelor of Arts degree, and then entered the St. John's Seminary in Brooklyn. He was ordained on May 21, 1921, and was assigned to Holy Child Jesus Parish in Richmond Hill, Queens. From 1925, Father Stedman was chaplain of the Monastery of the Precious Blood in Brooklyn. He was also Director of the Confraternity of the Precious Blood, which was erected in 1925 at the Monastery Chapel of the Cloistered Sisters Adorers of the Precious Blood. In 1944, Stedman was granted the title of monsignor.

His writings include My Sunday Missal, with illustrations by Ade Bethune, as well as My Military Missal, My Daily Readings from the Four Gospels, the "Triple" Novena Manual, and My Lenten Missal. At the time of his death, it was noted that more than 13,000,000 copies of his books had been sold. He died of a brain tumor at the age of forty-eight, at the Columbia-Presbyterian Medical Center.
