= Marie Rivier =

French sister (1768–1838)

Saint Marie Rivier
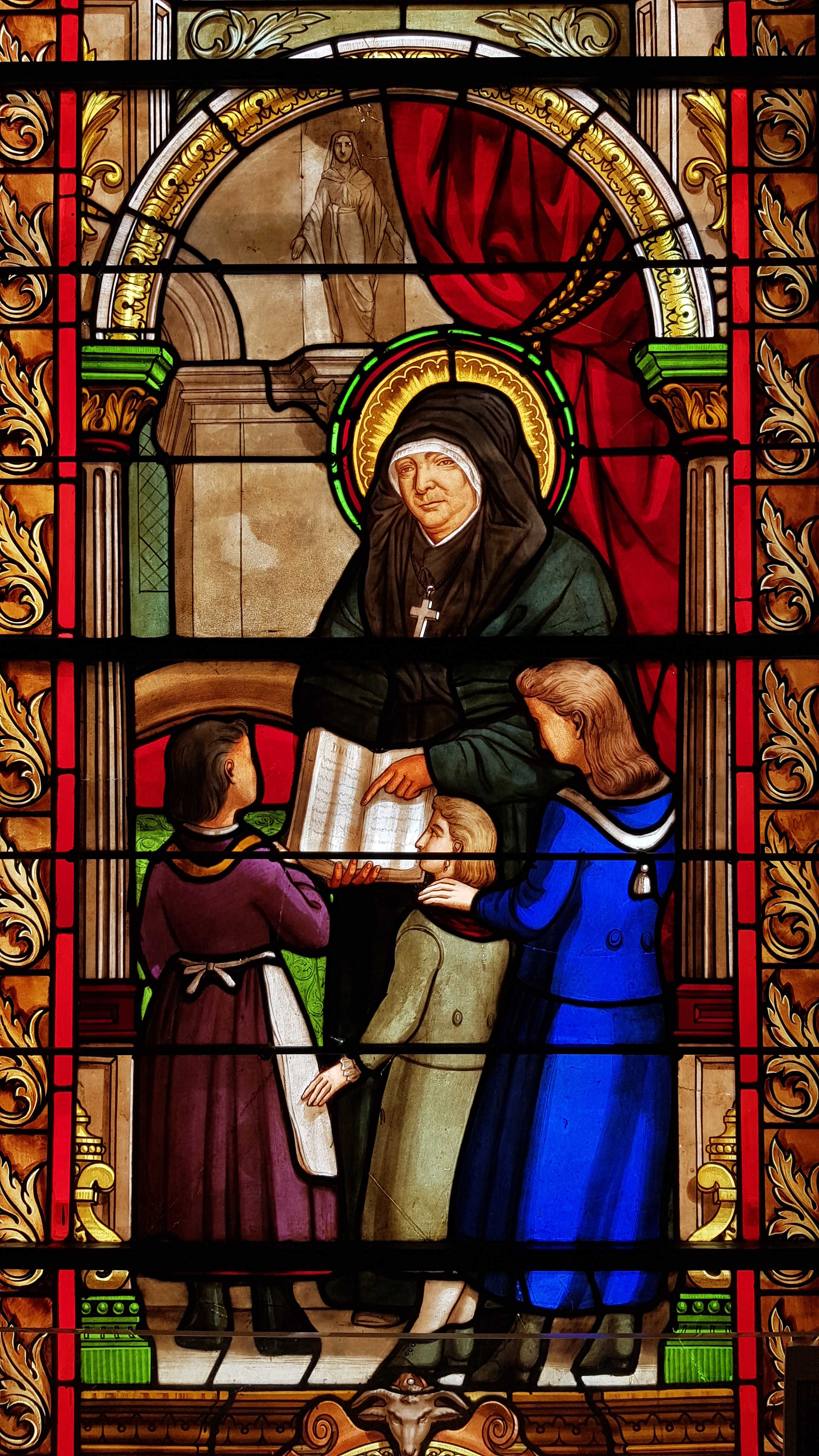

Virgin
- Born: 19 December 1768; Montpezat-sous-Bauzon, Ardèche, Kingdom of France
- Died: 3 February 1838 (aged 69); Bourg-Saint-Andéol, Ardèche, French Kingdom
- Venerated in: Roman Catholic Church
- Beatified: 23 May 1982, Saint Peter's Square by Pope John Paul II
- Canonized: 15 May 2022, Saint Peter's Square by Pope Francis
- Feast: 3 February
- Patronage: Sisters of the Presentation of Mary

Marie Rivier (19 December 1768 – 3 February 1838) was a French Catholic religious sister and the foundress of the Sisters of the Presentation of Mary. Rivier's focus was on education and she opened a school just before the beginning of the French Revolution which saw her school confiscated. The end of the revolution allowed for her to resume her educational inclinations and she also founded her religious order to take care of the education of orphans and other children who needed education.

Her beatification process began in mid-1853 under Pope Pius IX who referred to her as "The Woman-Apostle" while naming her a Servant of God. Pope Leo XIII later named her to be Venerable in 1890 while Pope John Paul II later beatified her in 1982. She was canonized by Pope Francis on 15 May 2022 in Rome.

== Life ==
Marie Rivier (known as "Marinette" to her parents) was born on 19 December 1768 in Montpezat-sous-Bauzon in Ardèche as the third of four children to Jean Rivier and his wife. Her baptism was celebrated that month before Christmas with her grandmother acting as her sponsor. Her mother died in 1793.

Sixteen months after her birth in late April 1770 she suffered an accident that resulted in a broken hip and ankle to the point that she would be unable to walk; she started to crawl in order to compensate for a total lack of movement. Until she turned five her mother took her to the local shrine - the "Chapel of the Penitents" - where she would spend hours in silent reflection before a representation of the Pietà. On 8 September 1774 she found that she was able to walk albeit with the help of crutches though would suffer from rickets and in her adulthood stood at four feet and four inches. For someone who had been unable to walk up until this stage it was in itself something of a miracle; her strength would return over time despite not being strong due to this. In 1785 she applied to join the Sisters of Notre Dame in Pradelles but was turned down due to her poor health. But she was undeterred and instead established a school in her home town in 1786.

The nation soon experienced the trauma of the French Revolution; all religious congregations were suppressed and acts of religious expression was viewed with suspicion. But she held fast to her belief in Jesus Christ and to the living-out of that faith; when there was no priest available to celebrate the Eucharist she would hold special services and she continued to teach about the Bible and other matters of faith. She had a particular devotion to Saint Francis Xavier and Saint Francis Regis.

In 1794 the authorities confiscated the building in which the school was run and Rivier and her companions moved to the town of Thueyts where Father Luigi Pontanier provided them support (he was a member of the Society of Saint-Sulpice). It was in the attic of the new school that - on 21 November 1796 - the five women dedicated themselves to God which was the formal foundation of her new religious order. The group pledged themselves to teaching and began working with orphans and visiting people in their homes. In 1797 the group had increased to twelve and the women made their religious professions on 21 November 1797. The Concordat of 1801 allowed for religion to be practiced once more in France and the fledgling congregation grew as a result of this. Due to the rapid increase in membership the motherhouse was moved to larger premises in Bourg-Saint-Andéol in 1815. In 1805 the order received a blessing and encouragement from Pope Pius VII who was crossing France to go back to Rome. She and several others were vested in the habit for the first time on 21 November 1807.

Rivier died in 1838 and she had suffered from dropsy towards the end of her life. In 2005 her order had 1352 religious in 189 houses in nations such as Ireland and the Philippines. The order received the decree of praise (before her death) on 6 May 1836 from Pope Gregory XVI while Pope Pius X issued full pontifical approval for her congregation on 23 May 1909. But it also received the approval needed from the government of King Charles X on 29 May 1830.

== Veneration ==
The beatification process started under Pope Pius IX (who once called her "The Woman Apostle") and she became titled as a Servant of God on 12 May 1853. The confirmation of her heroic virtue led Pope Leo XIII to name Rivier as Venerable on 13 June 1890. The confirmation of a miracle attributed to her allowed for Pope John Paul II to preside over her beatification on 23 May 1982.

Rivier was canonized on 15 May 2022 by Pope Francis.
