= Eugène Tremblay =

Canadian Roman Catholic bishop (1936–2026)

The Most Reverend Eugène Tremblay
- Bishop Emeritus of Amos
- Church: Roman Catholic Church
- Archdiocese: Gatineau
- Diocese: Amos
- Appointed: 3 May 2004
- Term ended: 22 February 2011
- Predecessor: Gérard Drainville
- Successor: Gilles Lemay
- Previous posts: Auxiliary Bishop of Québec and Titular Bishop of Succuba (1994–2004)

Orders
- Ordination: 24 June 1962
- Consecration: 6 January 1995 by Maurice Couture

Personal details
- Born: 20 February 1936 Saint-Hilarion, Quebec, Canada
- Died: 18 February 2026 (aged 89) Quebec City, Quebec, Canada
- Education: University of Ottawa
- Coat of arms

Eugène Tremblay (20 February 1936 – 18 February 2026) was a Canadian prelate of the Roman Catholic Church who served as Bishop of the Diocese of Amos from 2004 until his retirement in 2011. He previously served as an auxiliary bishop of the Archdiocese of Quebec.

== Early life and education ==
Tremblay was born on 20 February 1936 in Saint-Hilarion, Quebec, in the Charlevoix region of Quebec, Canada. He studied at the Petit Séminaire de Chicoutimi and the Petit Séminaire de Québec before completing theological studies at the Major Seminary of Québec. He was ordained to the priesthood on 24 June 1962 for the Archdiocese of Quebec.

He later pursued graduate studies in psychology at the University of Ottawa, earning a master's degree in 1972.

== Priestly ministry ==
Following his ordination, Tremblay served as a teacher and student life animator at the Petit Séminaire de Québec. He later became parish priest of Baie-Saint-Paul (1983–1988) and held various pastoral and diocesan responsibilities within the Archdiocese of Quebec.

== Episcopal ministry ==
On 3 November 1994, Pope Pope John Paul II appointed Tremblay as auxiliary bishop of the Roman Catholic Archdiocese of Quebec and titular bishop of Succuba. He was consecrated on 6 January 1995.

On 3 May 2004, he was appointed Bishop of Amos, succeeding Gérard Drainville. He served as diocesan bishop until 22 February 2011, when his resignation was accepted upon reaching the age of 75. He was succeeded by Gilles Lemay.

During his episcopal ministry, Tremblay served on commissions of the Canadian Conference of Catholic Bishops, including the Episcopal Commission for Liturgy.

== Death ==
Tremblay died in Quebec City on 18 February 2026, two days before his 90th birthday.

Catholic Church titles
Preceded by Gérard Drainville	Bishop of Amos; 2004–2011	Succeeded by Gilles Lemay
Preceded by Thomas Nantha	Titular Bishop of Succuba; 1994–2004	Succeeded by Gabriel Peñate Rodríguez
Preceded by —	Auxiliary Bishop of Québec; 1994–2004	Succeeded by —
