= Catherine Aurelia Caouette =

Canadian nun (1833–1905)

Venerable Catherine Aurelia Caouette
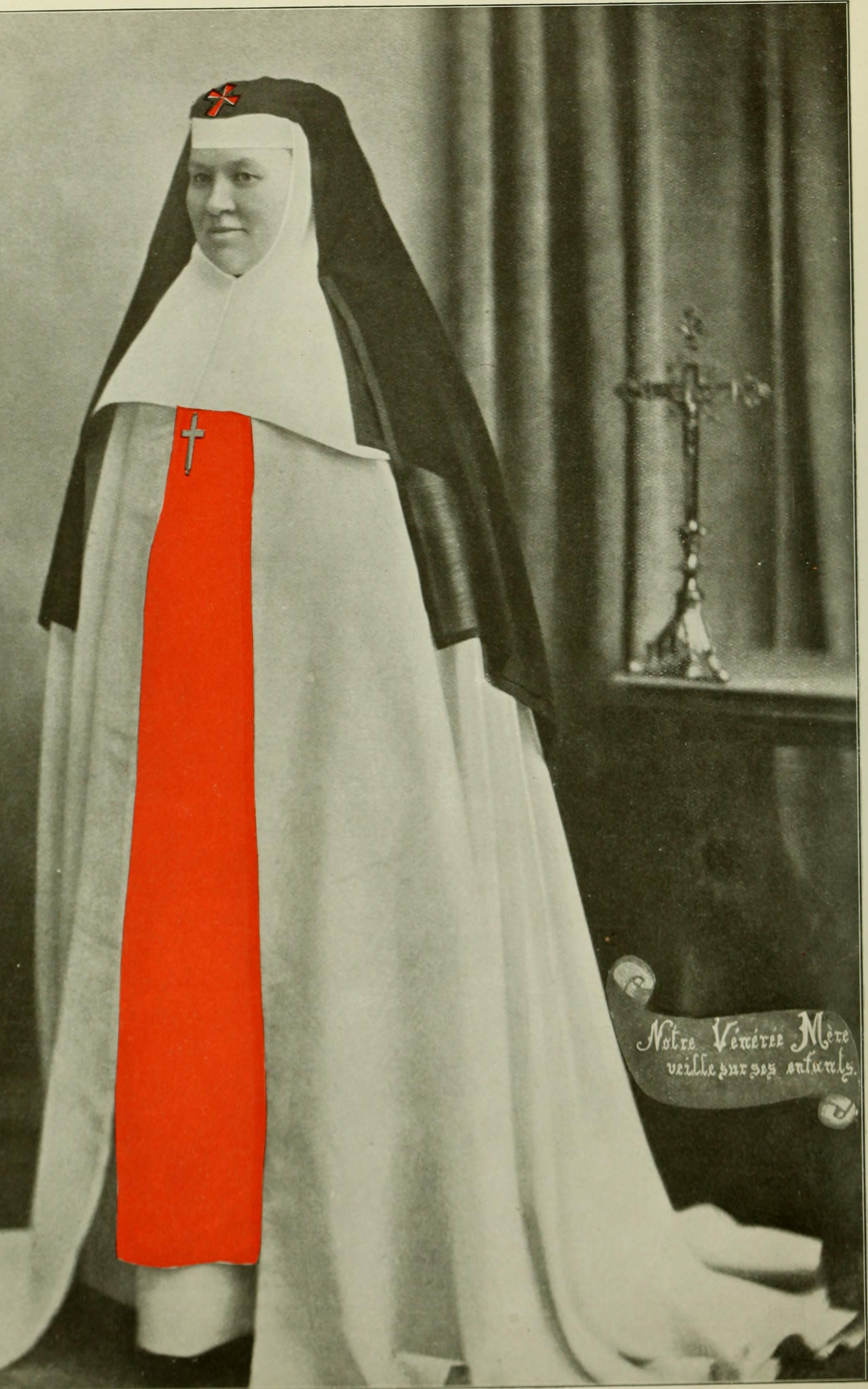
- Catherine Aurelia Caouette.

Religious
- Born: Aurélie Caouette; July 11, 1833; Saint-Hyacinthe, Lower Canada (Quebec)
- Died: July 6, 1905 (aged 71); Saint-Hyacinthe (Quebec, Canada)
- Venerated in: Roman Catholic Church
- Attributes: Religious habit

Catherine Aurelia Caouette (1833–1905), also known as Catherine-Aurélie du Précieux-Sang, was a Canadian nun, the founder of the Sisters Adorers of the Precious Blood.

== Early life ==
Aurélie Caouette was born on 11 July 1833 in Saint-Hyacinthe, Lower Canada (now Quebec). Her father was a blacksmith. She attended the local school, and in 1845 a boarding school run by the Congregation of Notre-Dame nuns. She left in 1850. Jean-Charles Prince, bishop of the diocese of St Hyacinthe, advised her to enter a teaching or nursing community but she did not feel this was her vocation. For some years she lived at home, living a cloistered existence and having religious experiences and visions. She took on the additional name "Catherine" to honour saint Catherine of Alexandria.

== Founding of the order ==
In 1859 she spoke with the bishop of Montreal, Ignace Bourget, who suggested that she found an order to venerate the blood of Christ. Bishop Prince supported the idea, but died before it could be implemented. His successor Joseph La Rocque did not initially support the scheme but eventually approved it and the new order was founded on 14 September 1861 as a group of four women living in Caouette's family home. Two years later they moved to a convent, and on that day Caouette made her vows and became the Mother Superior of the Sisters Adorers of the Precious Blood as Mother Catherine-Aurélie du Précieux-Sang.

The order grew: by 1866 there were 18 sisters and 9 novices, and by 1902 there were 10 further convents in Canada, the United States, and Cuba. Caouette attended the inaugurations of them all.

== Death and veneration ==
She died on 6 July 1905 at the order's convent in St Hyacinthe.

Soon after her death there were moves to propose her for canonisation, with the first formal request being made in 1929. On 1 December 2016 she was declared to be Venerable.
