= Joseph La Rocque =

Canadian Roman Catholic priest and professor (1808–1887)

- Bishop of Saint-Hyacinthe, Quebec
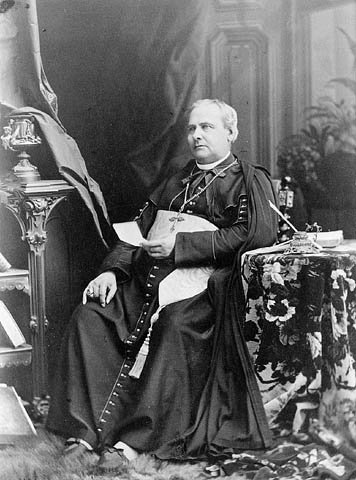
- Diocese: Saint-Hyacinthe
- Installed: June 22, 1860
- Term ended: February 4, 1866
- Predecessor: Jean-Charles Prince
- Successor: Charles La Rocque
- Other post: Coadjutor Bishop of Montreal

Orders
- Ordination: March 15, 1835

Personal details
- Born: August 28, 1808 Chambly, Lower Canada
- Died: November 18, 1887 (aged 79) Saint-Hyacinthe, Quebec

Joseph La Rocque, also spelled Larocque, (28 August 1808 – 18 November 1887) was a Canadian Roman Catholic priest, professor, and bishop.

== Life ==
Born in Chambly, Lower Canada, Joseph La Rocque received a classical education at the Collège de Saint-Hyacinthe. He was ordained a priest on 15 March 1835 by Bishop Jean-Jacques Lartigue. He taught calligraphy, stenography, and drawing as well as literature at Saint-Hyacinthe; and became director in 1840. When the college became a seminary in 1842, La Rocque was named Superior.

In 1849, La Rocque became canon at Saint-Jacques Cathedral (Montreal), and in 1849 editor of the diocese's Mélanges religieux (Religious Miscellany), until September 1851 when François-Magloire Derome took over. Canon La Rocque became spiritual director of the nuns of Notre-Dame de Charité du Bon-Pasteur and the Sisters of Charity of Providence.

In 1852, La Rocque accompanied Coadjutor Bishop Jean-Charles Prince to Rome as his secretary. When Prince was named Bishop of the Diocese of Saint-Hyacinthe, La Rocque was appointed Titular Bishop of Cydonia and Prince's successor as Coadjutor Bishop of Montreal. In 1860, he was transferred to succeed Prince as Bishop of Saint-Hyacinthe. He later took on the administration of the diocese of Saint-Hyacinthe from Nov. 1856 to July 1857 during Bishop Prince's illness.

During his tenure as bishop, La Rocque helped Catherine Aurelia Caouette found the congregation of the Sœurs Adoratrices du Précieux-Sang, and wrote the community's constitution.

In poor health for many years, La Rocque resigned in 1866. As titular Bishop of Germanicopolis and vicar-general, he remained in his diocese, at the monastery of the Sisters of the Precious Blood (a community which honored him as its founder), until his death on 18 November, 1887, at the age of seventy-nine. He was buried in the sisters' cemetery.

He was succeeded by his cousin, Charles La Rocque.
