= Louis-Zéphirin Moreau =

Canadian Roman Catholic prelate

Blessed Louis-Zéphirin Moreau
- Bishop of Saint-Hyacinthe
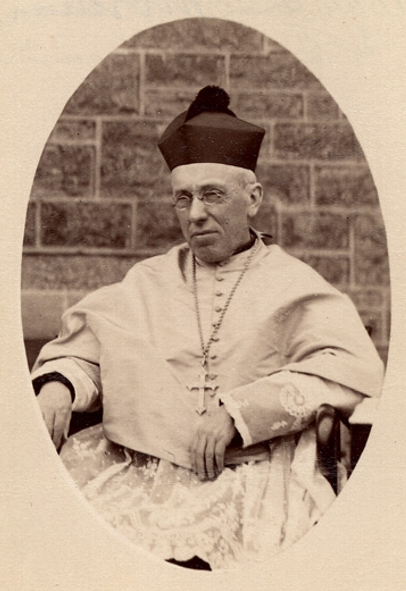
- c. 1900.
- Church: Roman Catholic Church
- Diocese: Saint-Hyacinthe
- See: Saint-Hyacinthe
- Appointed: 19 November 1875
- Predecessor: Charles La Rocque
- Successor: Maxime Decelles
- Previous post: Vicar General of Saint-Hyacinthe (1869–75)

Orders
- Ordination: 19 December 1846 by John Charles Prince
- Consecration: 16 January 1876 by Elzéar-Alexandre Taschereau

Personal details
- Born: Louis-Zéphirin Moreau; 1 April 1824 Bécancour, Lower Canada
- Died: 24 May 1901 (aged 77) Saint-Hyacinthe, Québec, Canada
- Buried: Cathedral of Saint-Hyacinthe-le-Confesseur, Saint Hyacinthe, Québec, Canada
- Motto: Omnia possum in eo qui me confortat ("Can do all things in Christ who strengthens me")

Sainthood
- Feast day: 24 May
- Venerated in: Roman Catholic Church
- Beatified: 10 May 1987; Saint Peter's Square, Vatican City by Pope John Paul II
- Attributes: Episcopal attire
- Patronage: Diocese of Saint-Hyacinthe; Sisters of St. Joseph of Saint-Hyacinthe; Sisters of Sainte Martha

Louis-Zéphirin Moreau (1 April 1824 – 24 May 1901) was a Canadian Catholic prelate who served as Bishop of Saint-Hyacinthe from 1875 until his death in 1901. He was also the cofounder of the Sisters of St. Joseph of St. Hyacinthe with Élisabeth Bergeron, and the founder of the Sisters of Sainte Martha.

Moreau was a frail child due to being born premature and so could not help his farmer parents work on their land. He dedicated himself to his studies and later his ecclesial studies despite the fact that illness forced him to slow down his studies which impeded on his progress to ordination. But a benefactor, Jean-Charles Prince, Coadjutor Bishop of Montreal, saw him advance towards his ordination and he served as an aide to several bishops in the diocesan secretariat and later as a diocesan vicar general.

In his role as a bishop he revitalized his diocese and erected several new parishes to further bolster the diocese's strength. He was known for his piousness and for his dedication to the religious life as evident in the foundation of two religious congregations he set himself.

After his death, Moreau's beatification was celebrated in 1987.

== Life ==
Louis-Zéphirin Moreau was born in Bécancour on 1 April 1824 to the farmers Louis-Zéphirin Moreau (26.8.1795–30.3.1871) and Marie–Marguerite Champoux (3.5.1798–25.12.1866) as the fifth of thirteen children with eleven of them having survived into adulthood. He was baptized just after his birth. He was a descendant of Jean Moreau from Saintonge and was the great-great-great grandson of one who settled at Batiscan in the second half of the 1600s. Moreau was born premature and was often ill in his childhood leading his parents to believe that he was unsuited for farm work. Their parish priest Charles Dion suggested that he could be academic rather than work in farming and so his parents sent him to learn Latin in his hometown under the schoolteacher Jean Lacourse.

Moreau commenced his studies for the priesthood in the Séminaire de Nicolet in 1839 which would last until 1844. In 1844 he was introduced at that time to the Archbishop of Québec Joseph Signay who was making a pastoral visit to Nicolet. He was impressed with Moreau who accepted him as a candidate for the priesthood and provided him with the tonsure. That autumn he began his theological studies but in November 1845 was forced to slow his studies down due to feeling fatigued. His health had not improved much and so in September 1846 the Archbishop of Québec who advised him to return home and give up the priesthood since his health would just impede it. But Father Dion and the teachers at Nicolet encouraged him to go to Montreal to offer his services armed with their recommendation letters. He also had a secret meeting with the Bishop of Montreal Ignace Bourget who was leaving for Europe and so put him in the care of his coadjutor Bishop Jean-Charles Prince.

Bishop Prince accepted Moreau into the episcopal palace to finish his studies while keeping watch over his progress; Prince conferred minor orders on Moreau in October 1846 and later the subdiaconate on 6 December and then the diaconate on 13 December. Prince ordained him a week later on 19 December after an examination determined that Moreau had the adequate level of theological understanding. Despite this he did a further five months of additional studies. Bishop Bourget returned in 1847 and Moreau became the cathedral's master of ceremonies while working in the diocesan secretariat; he also served as a chaplain to a convent of nuns. On 19 December 1847 he was made chaplain for the cathedral and preached once a week there while also hearing confessions. Moreau next worked alongside Bishop Bourget in the diocesan secretariat where the bishop's intense meditative and contemplative life impacted on him. In 1852 he agreed to become the adviser to Bishop Prince who was appointed to lead a new diocese.

Moreau served Prince's successors Joseph La Rocque and Charles La Rocque and administered the diocese during periods when the see was vacant such as in 1860 and between 1865 and 1866; he also managed the diocese in 1875 and during the bishop's absence in both 1862 and 1870. Bishop Charles La Rocque entrusted routine administration to Moreau after La Rocque's predecessor left diocesan finances in poor shape. From 1853 to 1858 he served as the chaplain for the boarding school that the Congregation of Notre-Dame managed and then from 1859 to 1866 for the nuns at the Hôtel-Dieu. He also served as a chaplain to the Soeurs de la Présentation de Marie from 1867 to 1869. In 1869 he was appointed as vicar general serving La Rocque in administration for the diocese and later in 1874 founded the Union Saint-Joseph to provide protection for workers from accidents or negligence. La Rocque's death in 1875 saw the people and priests propose Moreau to succeed him as bishop. However, the late La Rocque had once warned Archbishop Elzéar-Alexandre Taschereau that Moreau had some weaknesses in administration and instead recommended that the Bishop of Sherbrooke Antoine Racine succeed him. But other bishops rejected this recommendation and listed Moreau far ahead of the other two candidates Joseph-Alphonse Gravel and Jean-Remi Ouellette. In his official role as vicar general he sent a letter to Roman officials informing them of the bishop's death in order to begin succession plans while a letter came to him on 22 October informing him that the pope decided to name him as La Rocque's successor.

== Bishop ==
Roman officials approved Moreau's appointment on 21 September 1875 and Pope Pius IX appointed him as bishop for the diocese in a papal bull issued two months later on 19 November. He was consecrated on January 16, 1876 by the Archbishop of Québec with Bishops Louis-François Richer dit Laflèche and Édouard-Charles Fabre serving as the principal co-consecrators. Moreau created a court for matrimonial cases and in 1877 founded the Soeurs de Saint-Joseph and later the Sisters of Sainte Martha in 1883. He also held annual pastoral retreats in his diocese and would go on to found thirteen parishes. He left external administration and tiring visits to his coadjutor Maxime Decelles who was appointed as such in 1893.

Moreau received the Anointing of the Sick and the Viaticum before he died on 24 May 1901 at 5:00 pm; his remains were entombed within the diocesan cathedral.

== Beatification ==
The beatification process launched in the late bishop's diocese in an informative process that opened in 1929 and concluded later in 1934; this process was initiated to collect witness interrogatories and documentation that could attest to the late bishop's holiness. Theologians later confirmed his spiritual writings on 12 January 1950 as being in line with the Catholic Church's teachings and not in contradiction of it. The formal introduction to the cause came under Pope Pius XII on 21 June 1952 and he became titled as a Servant of God. It was after this that an apostolic process was launched in order to compile additional information on Moreau which spanned from 1953 until 1955. The Congregation for Rites validated these two processes in Rome on 31 January 1959 determining that the processes adhered to the rules the C.O.R. issued.

The Congregation for the Causes of Saints and their consultants met on 6 October 1970 and approved the cause while the cardinal and bishop members comprising the C.C.S. affirmed the cause as well on 31 October 1972. Moreau became titled as Venerable on 10 May 1973 after Pope Paul VI confirmed that the late bishop had lived a life of heroic virtue.

Moreau's beatification depended upon the papal confirmation of a healing deemed to be a miracle; a case that neither science nor medicine could explain. The case that would be acknowledged as a miracle for him to be beatified was investigated in Sault Sainte Marie in 1983 while the investigation itself received C.C.S. validation on 13 July 1984. Medical experts confirmed there was no possible medical or scientific explanation to the healing at their meeting on 22 January 1986 while theologians some months later on 13 June confirmed the healing came after requests for Moreau's intercession. Just a few weeks later on 8 July 1986 the C.C.S. members confirmed the case – based on the findings of the two previous boards – was indeed a miracle and that it would be submitted to the pope for final approval.

This approval came from Pope John Paul II on 10 November 1986 in a decree; the pope had approved the complete and rapid cure of Colleen Margaritae O'Brien – aged eight – who suffered from cancer in June 1978 while in remission and still undergoing treatment. John Paul II beatified Moreau on 10 May 1987.
