= Gérard Drainville =

- Bishop of Amos
- Church: Catholic Church
- Diocese: Diocese of Amos
- In office: 13 April 1978 – 3 May 2004
- Predecessor: Gaston Hains
- Successor: Eugène Tremblay

Orders
- Ordination: May 30, 1953
- Consecration: June 12, 1978 by Maurice Roy

Personal details
- Born: May 20, 1930 Île Dupas, Quebec, Dominion of Canada, British Empire
- Died: May 11, 2014 (aged 83) Amos, Quebec, Canada

Gérard Drainville (May 20, 1930 – May 11, 2014) was a Roman Catholic bishop.

Drainville was born in 1930 on Ile Du Pas to Norbert Drainville and Angeline Farley. After graduating from Joliette Seminary, Drainville studied geology and biology at the University of Montreal.

After graduation, he became a biology professor at Joliette Seminary, Le collège constituent de Joliette partie intégrante du Cégep régional de Lanaudière and Sacred Heart of Antanimena School in Antananarivo in Madagascar.

Ordained to the priesthood in 1953, Drainville became vicar of Saint-Lin–Laurentides in 1973 before becoming bishop of the Diocese of Amos, Canada, in 1978.

He resigned from the office in 2004. Drainville died in Amos, Quebec.
