= Sisters of St. Joseph of St. Hyacinthe =

Religious order

The Sisters of St. Joseph of St. Hyacinthe is a religious order founded at St. Hyacinthe, Quebec, Canada, on 12 September 1877, by the bishop of that diocese, Louis-Zéphirin Moreau, for the Christian instruction of children and the visitation and care of the sick. Civil incorporation was granted 30 June, 1881, and canonical institution 19 March, 1882. The activities of the congregation are confined to the Diocese of Saint Hyacinthe, in which 180 sisters are engaged, with about 3000 children under their care.
