= Green Route =

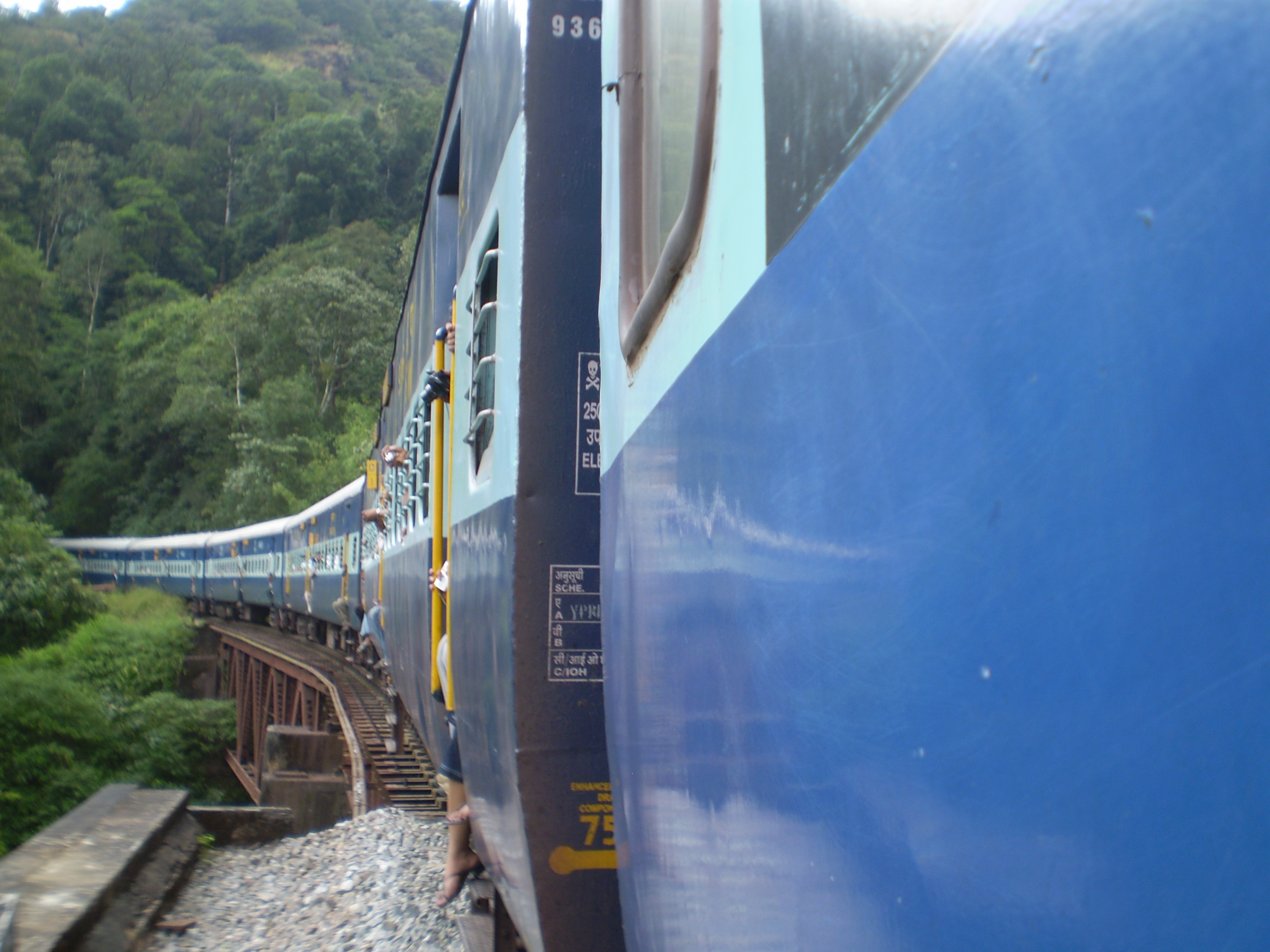
- Bridge on which the train runs amidst thick green blanket

Overview
- Other name(s): The trekker's paradise
- Locale: Karnataka, India
- Coordinates: 12°58′0″N 75°47′0″E

Green Route is a segment along the Bangalore and Mangalore railway line in India, within the Western Ghat mountain ranges.

This is the railway track from Sakaleshpura (altitude 906 m MSL) to the Kukke Subramanya (altitude 120 m MSL) Road station. It is 52 km long, with around 57 tunnels and 109 bridges of length varying from few metres to 0.75 km and height varying from a few to 200 metres. The tunnels are absolute terrestrial abyss. This railway track route was trekker's favourite when trains were not running on this track(line) This railway track route operated by South Western Railways has thick green vegetation besides rail line.

== Gallery ==
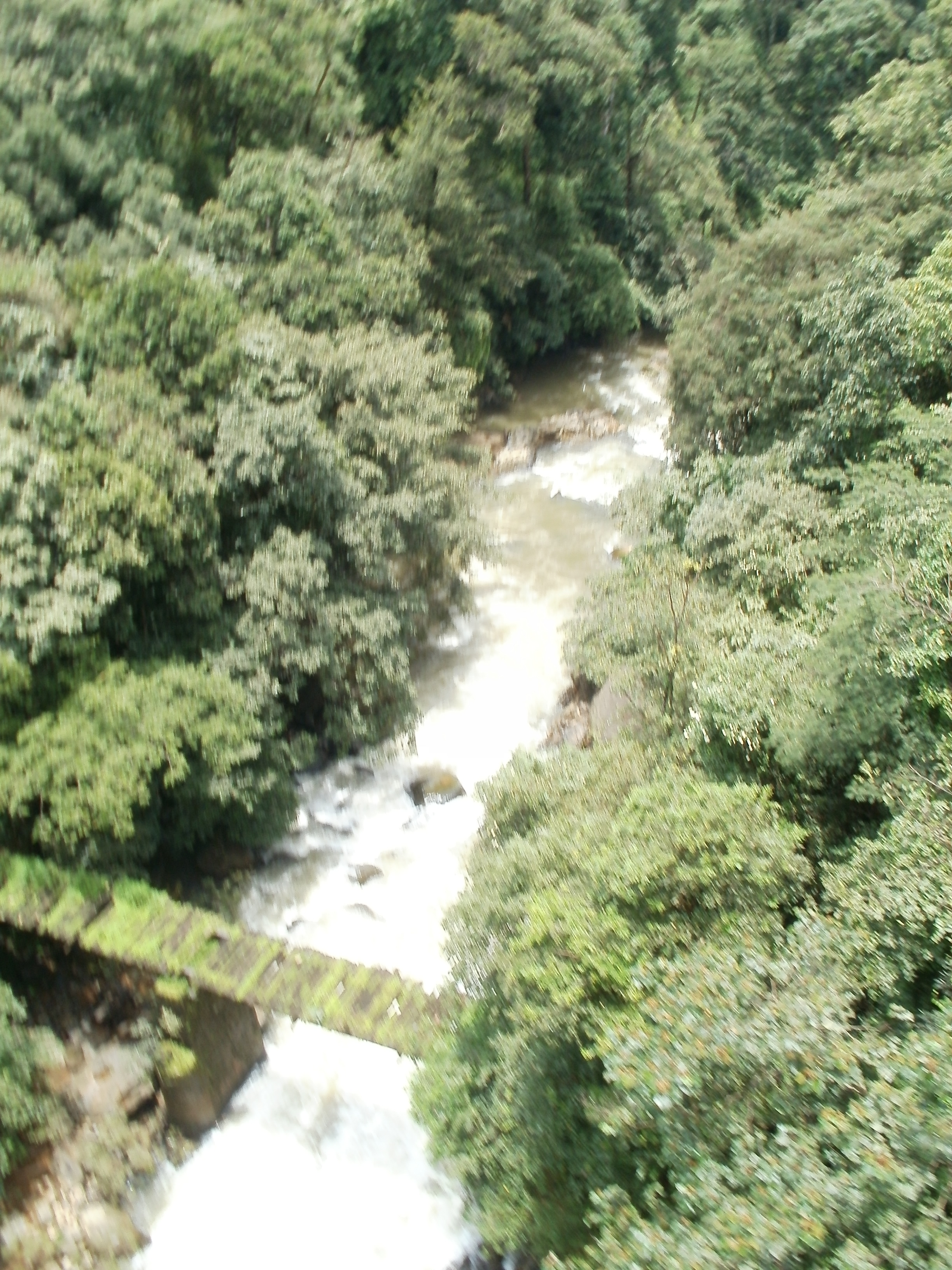

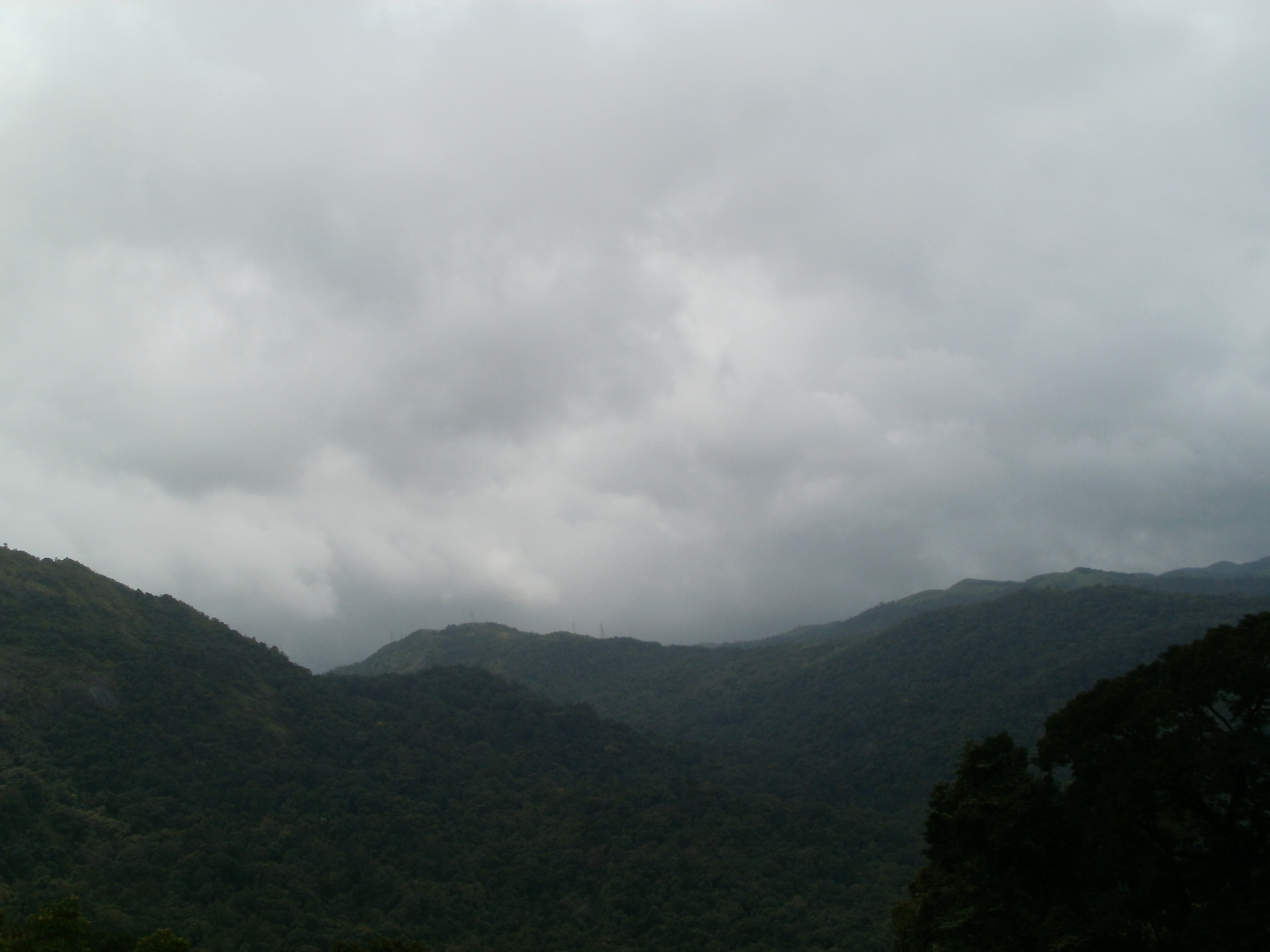

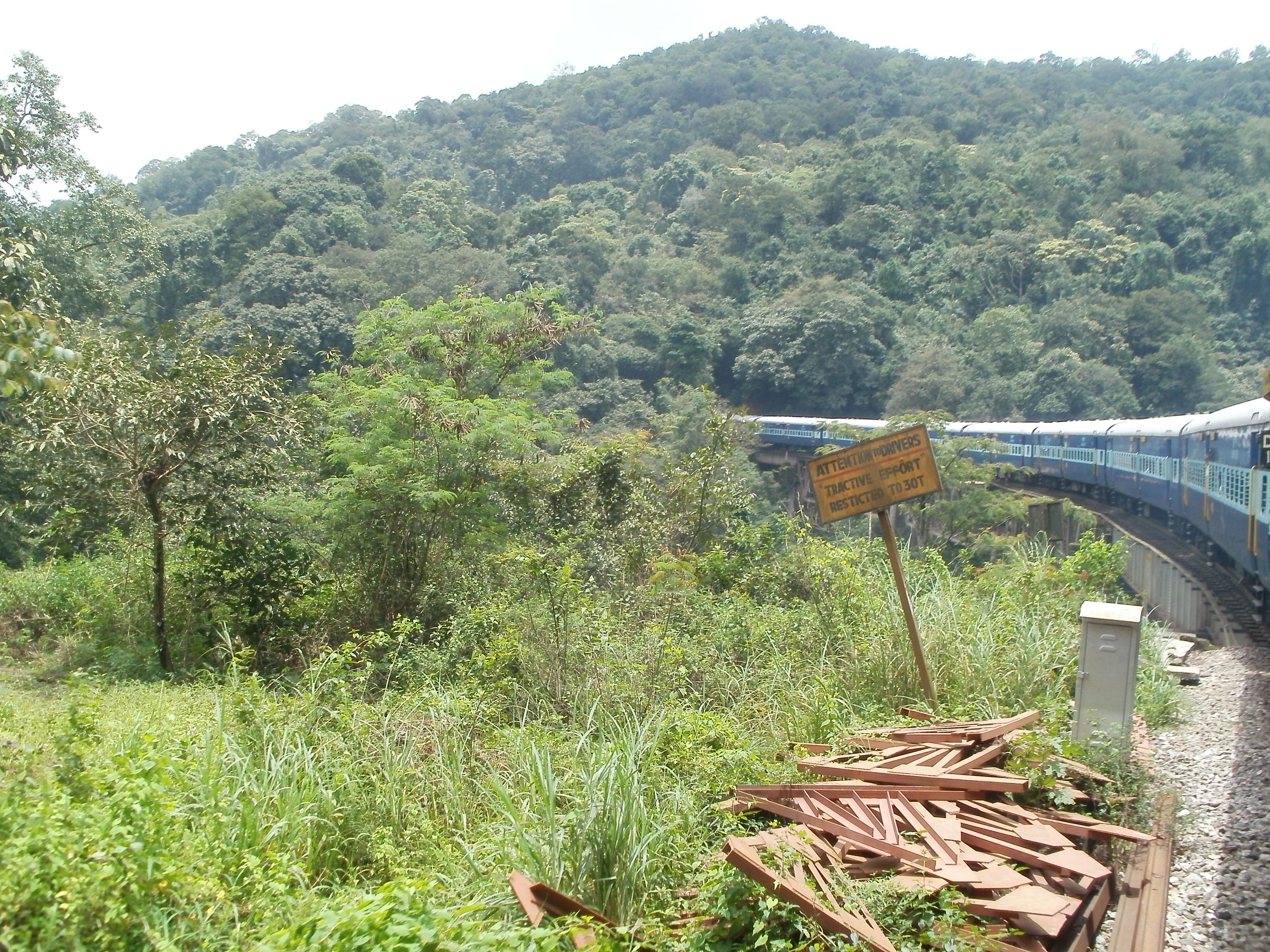

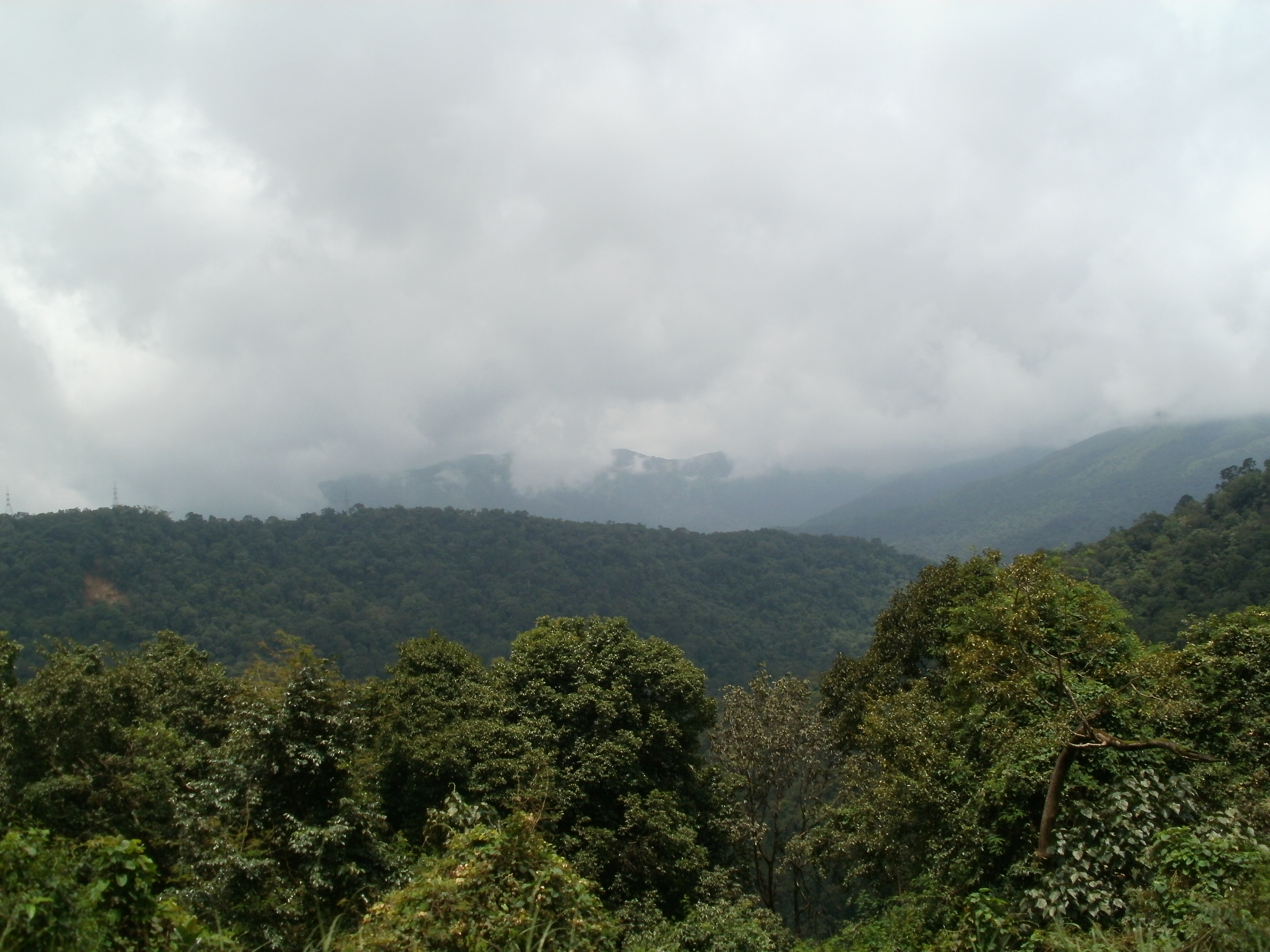

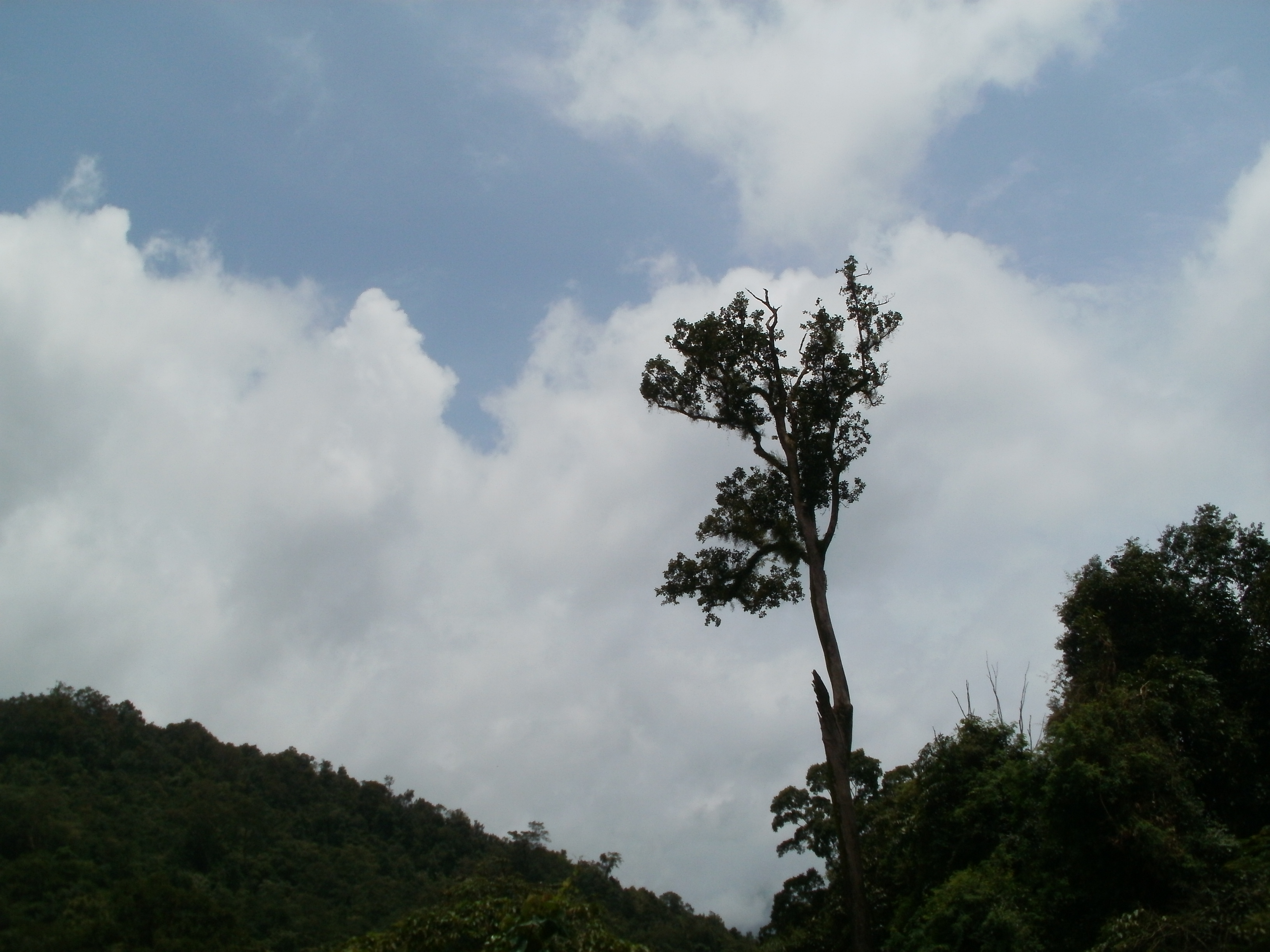

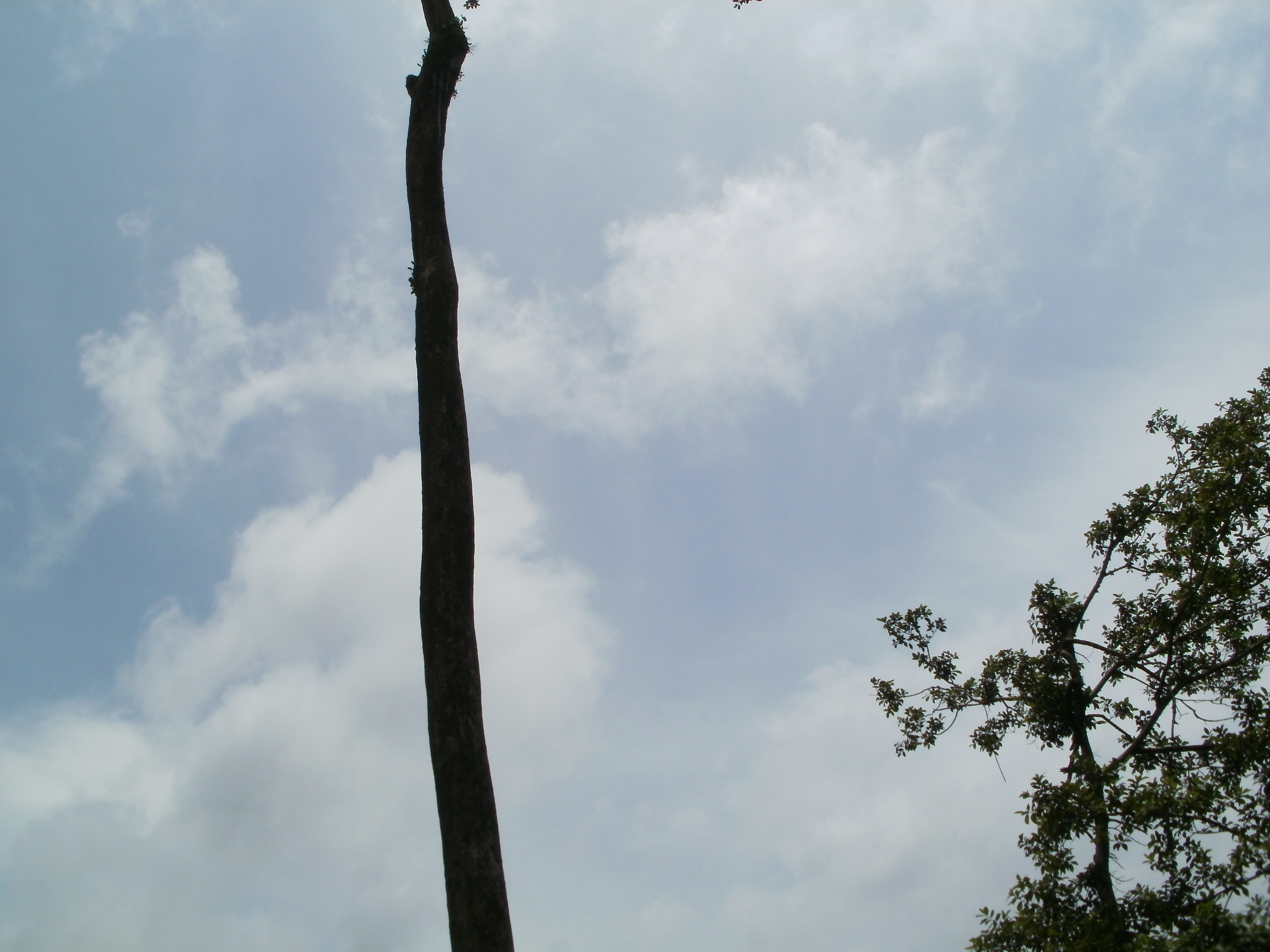

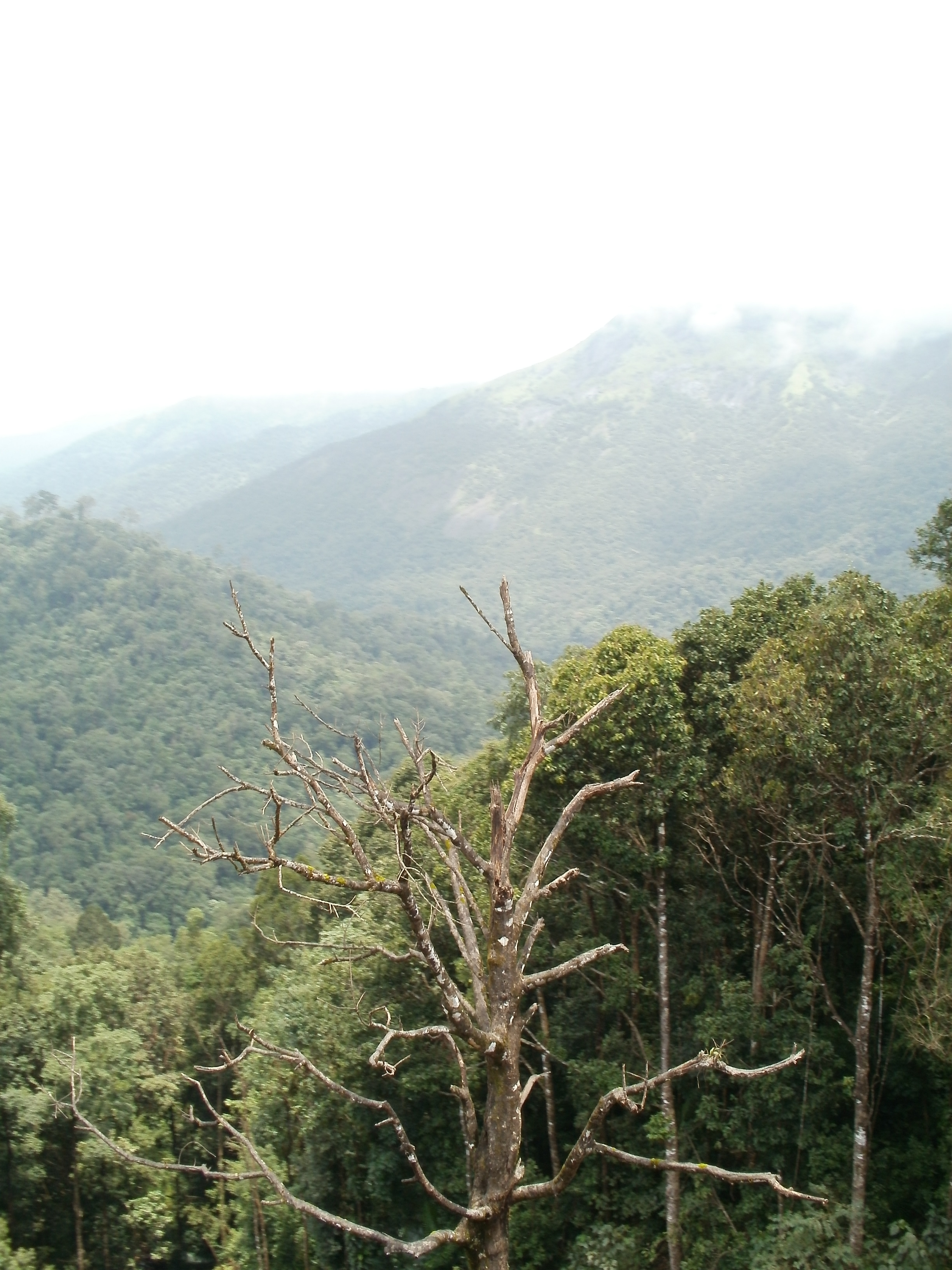
