= Diocese of Amos =

Catholic ecclesiastical territory

Coordinates: 48.5667°N 78.1167°W

Diocese of Amos Dioecesis Amosensis Diocèse d'Amos

Location
- Country: Canada
- Ecclesiastical province: Gatineau

Statistics
- Population: 89,000 (79.7%)
- Parishes: 58

Information
- Denomination: Catholic
- Sui iuris church: Latin Church
- Rite: Roman Rite
- Established: December 3, 1938
- Cathedral: Cathédrale Ste-Thérese d'Avila
- Patron saint: Teresa of Avila

Current leadership
- Pope: Leo XIV
- Bishop: sede vacante
- Metropolitan Archbishop: Paul-André Durocher
- Bishops emeritus: Gilles Lemay

Map

Website
- diocese-amos.org

The Diocese of Amos (French: Diocèse d'Amos, Latin: Dioecesis Amosensis) is a Latin Church ecclesiastical territory or diocese of the Catholic Church that covers part of the Province of Quebec. The diocese was erected by Pope Pius XI on December 3, 1938. Joseph-Aldée Desmarais was named its first bishop on June 20, 1939 by Pope Pius XII. It has a total area of 127,237 square miles (329,540 km^{2}) and a total population of 115,000.

The diocese was headed by Gilles Lemay, formerly an auxiliary bishop of the Archdiocese of Quebec, until his resignation on September 16, 2023, upon reaching the mandatory retirement age for bishops of 75. The Diocese of Amos is a suffragan diocese in the ecclesiastical province of the metropolitan Archdiocese of Gatineau.

The diocese has 35 priests, 47 Religious Sisters, and 91,600 Catholics (2012).

== Bishops ==
=== Diocesan bishops ===
- Joseph-Aldée Desmarais (1939 – 1968)
- Albert Sanschagrin (auxiliary bishop, 1957 – 1967)
- Gaston Hains (coadjutor, 1967 – 1968) (1968 – 1978)
- Gérard Drainville (1978 – 2004)
- Eugène Tremblay (2004 – 2011)
- Gilles Lemay (2011 – 2023)
- Guy Boulanger (2023 – 2026)

=== Other priests of this diocese who became bishops ===
- Roger Ébacher, appointed Bishop of Hauterive, Québec in 1979
- Marc Ouellet, appointed titular archbishop in 2001; later Cardinal Archbishop of Quebec
