= Sisters of the Presentation of Mary =

The Sisters of the Presentation of Mary (PM) are a religious congregation in the Latin Rite branch of the Catholic Church. It was founded in 1796 at Thueyts in the Ardèche department of south-central France, by Anne-Marie Rivier (1768–1838); originally, the congregation was devoted to the education of young girls.

The international motherhouse was permanently established at Bourg-Saint-Andéol, which is located in the Diocese of Viviers in the Rhône Valley, southern France. As of 2024, the sisters report 850 members ministering in 19 countries in Europe, Africa, Asia, North and South America.

== In Canada ==
The provincial house in Canada was founded on 18 October 1853, by Jean-Charles Prince, first Bishop of St. Hyacinthe. It is also the Canadian motherhouse and where the religious make their vows. The first six sisters, with Marie St-Maurice as superior, settled at Sainte-Marie-de-Monnoir (Marieville, Quebec), where E. Crevier, pastor of the parish, had prepared a convent. They opened a boarding-school and a class for day pupils.

In 1855 the novitiate was transferred to Saint-Hugues, Quebec, and in 1858 it was definitively located at Saint-Hyacinthe in a convent which was occupied up to this time by the Sisters of the Congregation of Notre Dame from Montreal.

This house became too small and the community erected, not far from the seminary, a large building of which they took possession in 1876. The convent occupied since 1858 then became an academy, with the later addition of a large annex. The students were installed there in 1907.

The Canadian sisters are engaged in a variety of apostolates: campus ministry in secondary schools, teaching, Catholic Christian Outreach at universities, nursing, inner city, spiritual direction, pastoral care, and working with the people of the First Nations.

== In the United States ==
The sisters from Canada established the first community in the United States at Glens Falls, New York. In 1886 this was followed by a boarding school in Island Pond, Vermont. Other foundations (mostly parochial schools) were set up in Maine; Methuen, Massachusetts (9–12 Presentation of Mary Academy); Hudson, New Hampshire (K-8 Presentation of Mary Academy), and Rhode Island. In 1933, Rivier College of liberal arts was established in Nashua, New Hampshire. In 1938, the communities in the United States became independent of those in Canada.

Over the years, the sisters have broadened their ministry from the original focus on schools in the northeastern United States. In 1950 a community was established in the Philippines with plentiful vocations leading to a separate province. From 1973–1991 work began among the Native Americans and Latinos of New Mexico, and from 1980–2005 among the poor of eastern Kentucky. In 2008 the Casa de Esperanza (House of Hope) community was established in Houston, Texas, where sisters work with children who have been subjected to abuse, deserted by parents, or exposed to HIV.

== Way of life ==
The sisters take the traditional religious vows of poverty (simple living), chastity (as a sign that only God can truly fulfill human needs), and obedience (discerning what God wants them to do) in order to better devote themselves to their ministry. Their ultimate goal is a closer union with God through service to God's people.

The charism of the sisters is "the spirit of self-offering in imitation of Mary," the mother of Jesus. At the centre of their existence is their "relationship with God, the mystery of prayer." To foster this experience they live together in order to "share our prayer, struggles, joys, possessions and our lives."

The sisters offer a discernment programme for both men and women wishing to discover God's will. This may involve weekend retreats and, for women, a live-in experience.
