= Sisters Adorers of the Precious Blood =

Catholic religious institute

The Sisters Adorers of the Precious Blood are a contemplative and cloistered religious institute of the Catholic Church. They were founded in 1861 by Catherine Aurelia Caouette in Saint-Hyacinthe, Quebec, Canada.

== History ==
The Sœurs Adoratrices du Précieux-Sang was established as a cloistered, contemplative community in 1861 in Saint-Hyacinthe, Quebec. The first subsequent foundation was that of Toronto in 1867. A monastery was opened in Montreal, Quebec in 1874.

In 1925, Precious Blood Monastery in Edmonton, Alberta was established. With declining membership, the monastery closed in 2012, with two sisters going to the nursing home at Providence Centre, and the other four dispersing to monasteries in Calgary, Quebec and Portland, Maine.

A Monastery of the Precious Blood opened in Portland, Oregon in 1891 and closed in 1992, the sisters dispersing to houses in the East. A house was opened in Havana, Cuba in 1902 and closed in 1960. A Monastery of the Precious Blood in Charlottetown, Prince Edward Island opened in 1929 but closed in 2012.

== Life ==
The Sisters follow a routine of prayer and of work, supporting themselves through the sale of their handicrafts as well as donations. They wear a distinctive religious habit consisting of a white tunic, with a red scapular over it and a red sash. Their mission, in the words of their foundress, is to pray for the salvation of the world and for an increased holiness of the clergy of the Catholic Church.

== Present day ==
As of 2020, the institute was composed of autonomous Monasteries of the Precious Blood in the United States, Canada and Japan. Two independent monasteries are located in Japan.

French Generalate (Canadian -French speaking) There is a French-speaking community in St.-Hyacinthe, Que., where the order was founded.

London Generalate (Canadian -English speaking)

- In 1913 eleven sisters from the Toronto house established a foundation in London, Ontario. The General Superior, other administrative Sisters and new members of the community who are in formation, reside at the London monastery.
- Regina Coeli Monastery was opened in 1933 in Regina, Saskatchewan, by sisters from Edmonton. It is part of the London Generalate.
- Our Lady of Peace Monastery was founded in Hamilton in 1946 by eight sisters from the Winnipeg community. Our Lady of Peace houses the community's infirmary and takes in sick and elderly sisters from the monasteries in Calgary, Regina and London.
- The Precious Blood Monastery in Calgary was founded in 1951 by eight sisters from the Edmonton house, (which itself was founded from Toronto). They support themselves by the making and distribution of altar breads throughout the diocese and beyond.

A monastery was established in Ottawa, Ontario in 1887. When the convent was sold, the eleven remaining Sisters moved to a convent near Quebec City. In 1991, the building was purchased by the Royal College of Physicians and Surgeons.

American Federation of Monasteries:

- Monastery of the Precious Blood in Brooklyn, New York (1890) In 2012, when the Flatlands monastery of the Servants of the Lord and the Virgin of Matará Sisters (S.S.V.M.) was found to be in need of significant repair, the Sisters Adorers of the Precious Blood welcomed them. The two communities share the building.
- A Monastery of the Precious Blood was founded in Manchester, New Hampshire in 1898. In 1934 sisters from Manchester opened a house in Portland, Maine. The Portland house closed in 2018, with the remaining two sisters returning to Manchester.
- Sisters from Manchester founded a monastery in Watertown, New York in 1963.

A house opened in Lafayette, Indiana in 1955, closed in 2006.

== See also ==
- The Right Reverend Joseph F. Stedman

== Sources ==
- "Sisters of the Precious Blood-the thirty ninth anniversary of the order celebrated in Brooklyn." New York Times. New York, N.Y.: September 17, 1900. p. 10, 1 p. The order had 10 houses in the U.S. and Canada, enclosing 300 souls. ProQuest document ID: 105751771 Text Word Count 873. (subscription) viewed 9/29/2006
- Cook, Joan. "Even Today, Some Nuns Choose the Cloistered Life of Prayer." New York Times. New York, N.Y.: July 6, 1971. p. 38, 1 p. ProQuest document ID: 90680535 Text Word Count 2853 (subscription) viewed 9/29/2006
- Lieblich, Julia. "The Cloistered Life; More American women are finding a vocation in the age-old observance of silence and solitude to facilitate prayer." New York Times. New York, N.Y.: July 10, 1983. p. SM12, 9 pp. ProQuest document ID: 119514659 Text Word Count 5487 (subscription) viewed 9/29/2006
