= Charles La Rocque =

Canadian Roman Catholic priest

- Bishop of Saint-Hyacinthe, Quebec
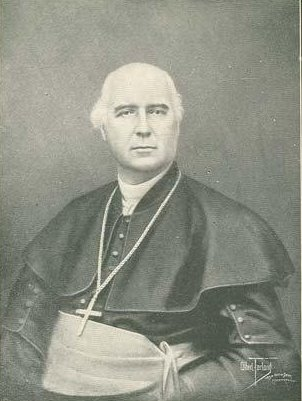
- Diocese: Saint-Hyacinthe
- Installed: March 20, 1866
- Term ended: July 25, 1875
- Predecessor: Joseph La Rocque
- Successor: Louis-Zéphirin Moreau

Orders
- Ordination: July 29, 1832

Personal details
- Born: November 15, 1809 Chambly-sur-Richelieu, Lower Canada
- Died: July 15, 1875 (aged 65) Saint-Hyacinthe, Quebec

Charles La Rocque, also spelled Larocque, (November 15, 1809 – July 15, 1875) was a Canadian Roman Catholic priest and third Bishop of Saint-Hyacinthe from 1866 to 1875.

Charles La Rocque was born 15 Nov. 1809 at Chambly-sur-Richelieu, L.C., the eldest son of Henri and Sophie Robert La Rocque. He attended the College of Saint-Hyacinthe on scholarship, as did his cousin Joseph La Rocque. Upon completion of his studies he decided to enter religious life. While preparing for the priesthood, he taught humanities at the College of Saint-Hyacinthe. In 1831 he went to Montreal to complete his studies in theology at the seminary of Saint-Jacques.

He was ordained to the priesthood 29 July 1832, and served as vicar at Saint-Roch-de-l'Achigan and Berthier; and as curé at St. Pie de Bagot, Ste. Marguerite de Blainville, and St. John Dorchester. On 15 September 1863, Father Charles was at Burlington, Vermont for the laying of the cornerstone of St. Mary's Cathedral. The Mass was sung by Rev. La Rocque in the open air with the altar placed in the same location as planned once the cathedral was completed. (In 2018 the Diocese of Burlington announced plans to merge the parish with St. Joseph's due to low attendance and sell the property.)

== Bishop ==
Upon the resignation of his cousin as Bishop of the Diocese of Saint Hyacinthe, Charles La Rocque was chosen to succeed him. The new bishop was a highly cultured man with rare financial ability; realizing that the debts of his cathedral called for unusual measures, he closed the episcopal palace and retired with his staff to Beloeil, where he combined the duties of bishop and pastor of this parish. Bishop La Rocque assisted at the Vatican founding the Sherbrooke Diocese. He opened the first house of the Dominicans in Canada by giving them a parish, Notre-Dame-du-Rosaire, in his titular city, and had the satisfaction of effectively reducing the cathedral debt and placing the diocese on a satisfactory money basis. In 1870, he attended the Vatican Council, but left early due to a serious illness.

Bishop La Rocque died on 15 July 1875 at the Hôtel-Dieu of Saint-Hyacinthe.
