= Jean-Charles Prince =

Canadian Roman Catholic priest (1804–1860)

- Bishop of Saint-Hyacinthe, Quebec
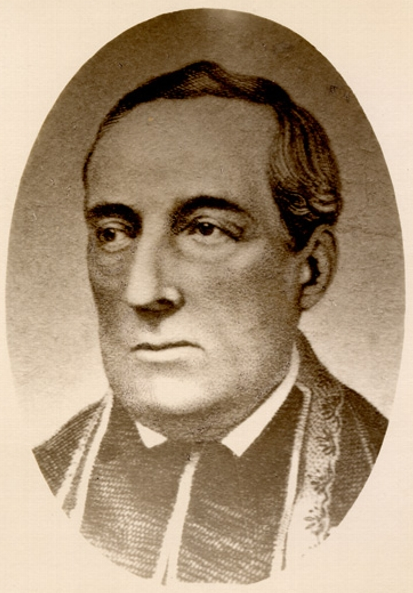
- Diocese: Saint-Hyacinthe
- Installed: June 8, 1852
- Term ended: May 5, 1860
- Predecessor: None
- Successor: Joseph La Rocque
- Other posts: Coadjutor Bishop of Montreal, Quebec

Orders
- Ordination: September 23, 1826

Personal details
- Born: February 13, 1804 Saint-Grégoire (Bécancour), Lower Canada
- Died: May 5, 1860 (aged 56) Saint-Hyacinthe, Lower Canada

Jean-Charles Prince (13 February 1804 – 5 May 1860) was a Canadian Roman Catholic priest, teacher, seminary administrator, editor, and Bishop of Saint-Hyacinthe, Lower Canada from 1852 to 1860.

== Life ==
Jean-Charles Prince was born 13 February 1804 at Saint-Grégoire (Bécancour), Lower Canada to Jean and Rosalie Bourg Prince. His father was a farmer. He attended the minor Séminaire de Nicolet from 1813 to 1822, when he began his studies for the priesthood. He taught rhetoric and the humanities while still a seminarian. On 23 September 1826 he was ordained. Prince then became secretary to Jean-Jacques Lartigue, an auxiliary bishop of the Diocese of Quebec and vicar general for Montreal. Father Prince was also appointed chaplain of Saint-Jacques Cathedral, Bishop Lartigue's cathedral seat.

In 1831, Prince was made director of the major seminary, the Collège de Saint-Hyacinthe, a position he held until 1840. In addition to his regular duties, Prince also taught theology and served as prefect of studies. He supervised the expansion of the establishment, which took the name of Séminaire de Saint-Hyacinthe in 1833.

Attempting to maintain neutrality during the political unrest at the time was challenging. Following the battles of Saint-Denis and Saint-Charles-sur-Richelieu in 1837, the Séminaire de Saint-Hyacinthe sheltered for a few days 200 soldiers and six officers, while also hiding two Patriote leaders on the run. Prince was obliged to assert on more than one occasion that the institution was entirely neutral.

In April 1840 Bishop Lartigue died and was succeeded by his coadjutor Ignace Bourget as Bishop of Montreal. Bishop Bourget brought Prince to Montreal to establish the Mélanges religieux, a Catholic newspaper. Prince remained in charge of the newspaper until November 1843. His other duties included serving as a canon at the cathedral, and as chaplain to the Montreal Asylum for Aged and Infirm Women. He helped to train the novices who were to form the Daughters of Charity, Servants of the Poor, and was chief chaplain to the Congregation of Notre-Dame and the Religious Hospitallers of St Joseph of the Hôtel-Dieu in Montreal. He assisted the foundation of the Sisters of Providence and the Convent of the Good Shepherd. He accompanied a group of Hospitallers to Kingston, Upper Canada, at the request of the bishop there, Rémi Gaulin. Prince left for Kingston on 19 November and stayed a year. As well as helping the sisters get settled, he ministered to the French Canadians of the region and studied English.

On July 5, 1844, Pope Gregory XVI appointed him titular bishop of Martyropolis and coadjutor of Montreal. During a pastoral visit to Bytown in 1846, the bishop blessed the chapel of Notre-Dame de Bon Secours, which had been built in Hull for the purpose of ministering to the woodcutters. On June 29, 1851, he laid the first stone of the church of Saint-Pierre-Apôtre.

== Bishop of Saint-Hyacinthe ==
In 1851 he was sent to Rome to deliver to Pope Pius IX the acts of the provincial council of Quebec. It was while he was still in Rome that Pope Pius IX, on June 8, 1852, created the new diocese of Saint-Hyacinthe and appointed him as the first bishop.

Bishop Prince brought the French Sisters of the Presentation of Mary and the Dominicans to his diocese. Particularly interested in the care of the elderly and sick he supporting the efforts of the Sisters of Charity of Montreal. Bishop Prince died on May 5, 1860.
