= Marie-Élisabeth Turgeon =

Beatified Canadian religious sister and foundress

Blessed Marie-Élisabeth Turgeon
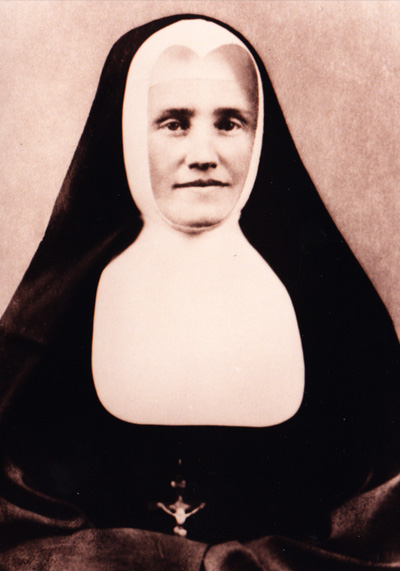
- Born: Élisabeth Turgeon; 7 February 1840; Beaumont, Quebec, Canada
- Died: 17 August 1881 (aged 41); Rimouski, Quebec, Canada
- Venerated in: Catholic Church
- Beatified: 26 April 2015, Rimouski, Canada by Cardinal Angelo Amato
- Feast: 17 August

Marie-Élisabeth Turgeon (7 February 1840 – 17 August 1881), born as Élisabeth Turgeon, was a Canadian religious sister and the founder of the Sisters of Our Lady of the Rosary. She assumed the name Marie-Élisabeth as her religious name.

Turgeon was cleared for beatification in 2014 after a miracle that had found to have been attributed to her intercession was cleared. She was beatified on 26 April 2015 in Canada by Cardinal Angelo Amato on behalf of Pope Francis.

== Biography ==
Turgeon was born in 1840 as one of nine children to Louis-Marc Turgeon and Angèle Labrecque. As a child, she made frequent visits to the church and felt a religious call which solidified as she grew older. Turgeon's father died when she was 15 and she remained in the care of her mother during this time. She would graduate from the Laval Normal School in Quebec in 1862 and taught at several schools after her graduation in places like Saint-Romuald and Saint-Roch.

On 3 April 1875 at the invitation of Jean Langevin (first bishop of Rimouski) she entered the Sisters of the Little Schools and made her profession of vows alongside twelve others on 12 September 1879.

She established the Sisters of Our Lady of the Rosary on 12 September 1878 as the order's first superior and devoted all her work to mentorship and the institution of educational facilities in Rimouski.

As she fell ill, she continued to direct the order and its functioning. Emergencies in her health on 23 March 1881 and 26 March led to her doctor and confessor being called in to perform medical examinations and the Anointing of the Sick. Bedridden, she was dying in August and the order led prayer vigils for her health. On 15 August, the Feast of the Assumption, she met with professed members of the order and the next day, she knew that her end was near. At 12:20am on 17 August, Turgeon died.

== Beatification ==
The cause of beatification for Turgeon was called for after her death and the Congregation of the Causes of Saints granted "nihil obstat" (nothing against) which allowed for the title of Servant of God to be bestowed upon her. The Archdiocese of Rimouski was responsible for the diocesan process of the cause and submitted its work - the Positio - to Rome. The Congregation of the Causes of Saints then evaluated the documentation to assess whether or not Turgeon lived a virtuous life.

Pope Francis recognized her life of heroic virtue and named her to be venerable on 9 October 2013 and later recognized a miracle attributed to her on 17 September 2014. Her beatification was celebrated in Rimouski on 26 April 2015.
