= Marie-Léonie Paradis =

Canadian Catholic religious sister (1840–1912)

Saint Marie-Léonie Paradis PSSF
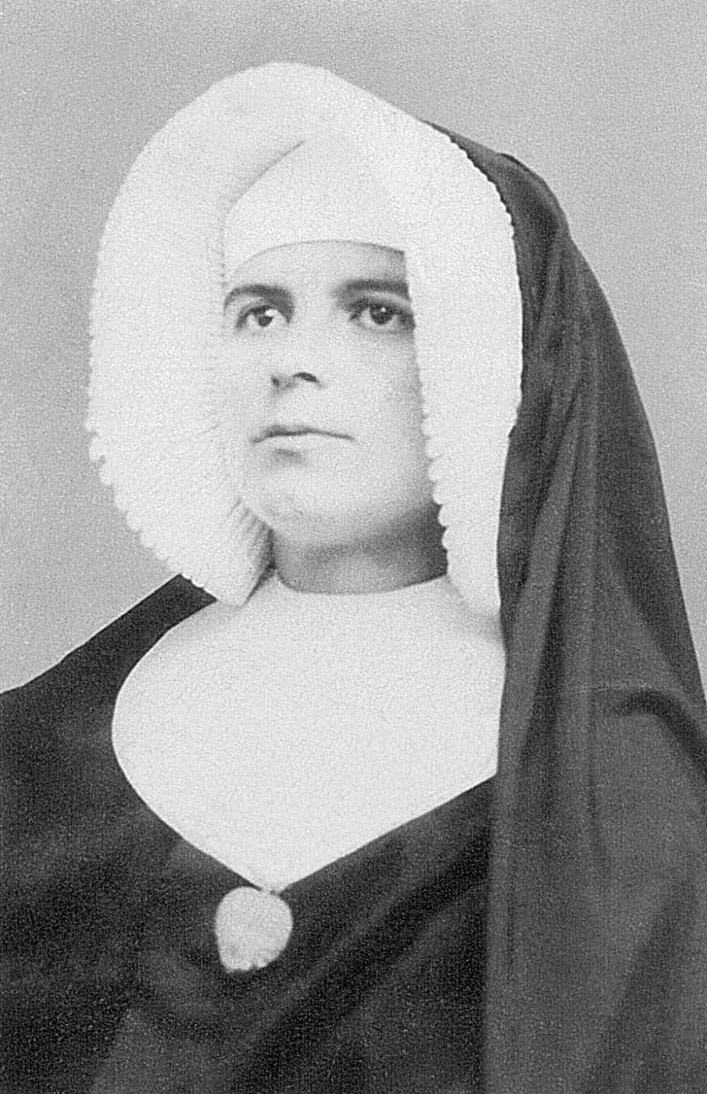

Virgin
- Born: 12 May 1840; Sainte-Marguerite-de-Blairfindie, Québec, Canada
- Died: 3 May 1912 (aged 71); Sherbrooke, Québec, Canada
- Venerated in: Roman Catholic Church
- Beatified: 11 September 1984, Montreal, Quebec, Canada by Pope John Paul II
- Canonized: 20 October 2024, St Peter's Square, Vatican City by Pope Francis
- Feast: 4 May
- Attributes: Habit of a Little Sister of the Holy Family, rosary, crucifix

Marie-Léonie Paradis, PSSF (born Virginie-Alodie Paradis but raised as Élodie Paradis; 12 May 1840 – 3 May 1912) was a French-Canadian Catholic religious sister from Quebec who established the Little Sisters of the Holy Family in 1880, dedicated to the domestic needs in the field of education across Canada.

Pope John Paul II beatified her when he visited Canada in 1984 and she was canonized in October 2024 by Pope Francis.

== Life ==
Alodie-Virginie Paradis was born in Quebec in 1840 as the sole daughter — the third of six children, only three of whom survived to adulthood – of Joseph Paradis and Emilie Gregoire. She was educated by the Sisters of Notre Dame. Paradis received the sacrament of Confirmation and the First Communion in 1849 and 1850 respectively.

On 21 February 1854 at the age of fourteen, she became a candidate of the congregation of the Marianites of Saint-Laurent in Montreal. Despite her frail health, she was nevertheless admitted and pronounced her vows on 22 August 1857. She received the religious name Marie de Sainte-Léonie (which was shortened to Marie-Léonie). She taught in Montreal for several years.

In 1862 she was sent to the St. Vincent de Paul, a parish for French-speaking Catholics in Manhattan, where the congregation ran an orphanage. She remained there until 1870, when she joined the Sisters of Holy Cross, the American branch of the congregation, located at Notre Dame, Indiana. There she taught French and needlework to the sisters training to become teachers.

In 1874, Paradis was appointed novice mistress at the Collège Saint-Joseph in Memramcook, New Brunswick. The school was in need of basic support in the housekeeping and culinary departments.

On 31 May 1880, Paradis established the Little Sisters of the Holy Family. On a number of occasions she asked Bishop John Sweeny of New Brunswick to grant approval to the small community, but it was not forthcoming. In 1895, she persuaded Bishop Paul LaRocque of Sherbrooke, who was himself looking for domestic staff for his seminary, to receive the motherhouse and the noviciate of the Little Sisters into his diocese and to give them diocesan approval. The community moved to Quebec and Larocque granted canonical approval on 26 January 1896.

Paradis at first continued to wear the habit of her former congregation but relinquished it on 2 October 1904 in favor of that of the new congregation. In 1905 it was Pope Pius X who relieved her of her obligations towards the Holy Cross Congregation.

Paradis soon became seriously ill with a malignant cancer, and her health slowly declined. On the morning of her death, she received permission to publish the rule of the Little Sisters. She died suddenly after receiving the last sacraments on 3 May 1912. Her remains were exhumed on 4 October 1935.

== Beatification and canonization ==
The beatification process commenced on diocesan level in Sherbrooke on 27 November 1952 and concluded in 1952. The formal introduction of the cause for the Servant of God came on 13 June 1966 under Pope Paul VI. A second process was convoked and spanned for a mere three months in 1968. Both of the local processes were ratified in 1970. Pope John Paul II recognized Paradis' life of heroic virtue on 31 January 1981 and proclaimed her to be venerable. He approved a miracle attributed to her on 17 February 1984 and beatified Paradis on 11 September 1984 in Montreal.

A second miracle was investigated and the process was ratified in 2006. The medical board that advises the Congregation for the Causes of Saints approved the healing as a miracle on 19 June 2008 and it was approved by Pope Francis on January 24, 2024. The miracle in question is the healing of an infant girl having suffered from perinatal asphyxia with multiple organ dysfunction syndrome and encephalopathy, born a preterm birth at Saint-Jean-sur-Richelieu on November 9, 1986. Paradis was canonised by Pope Francis on October 20, 2024, among the 14 blesseds.

Paradis is only third Canadian saint born in Canada, joining Marie-Marguerite d'Youville and André Bessette.
