= Saint-Germain Cathedral =

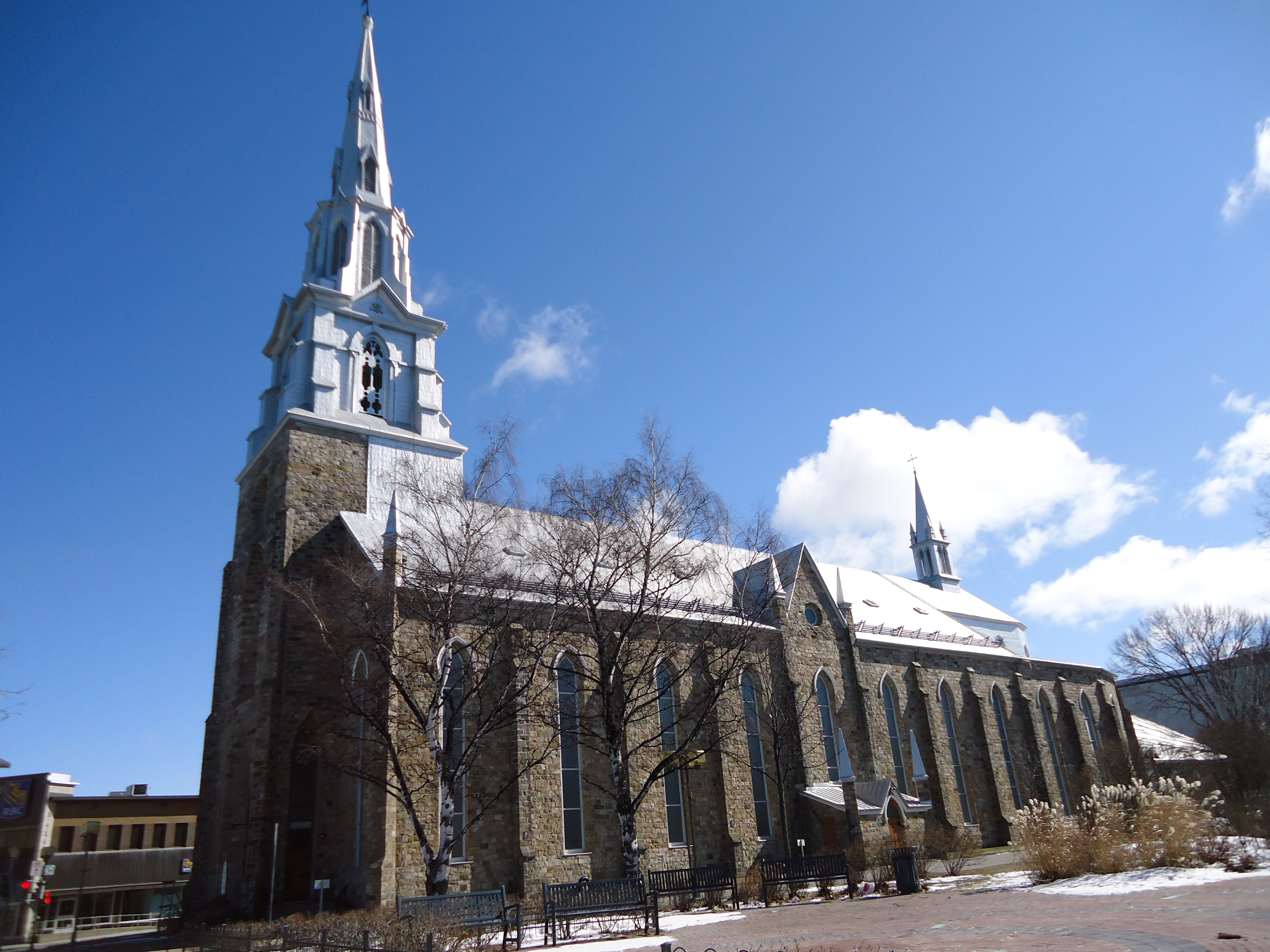
- Saint-Germain Cathedral
- 48.4509°N 68.5276°W
- Location: Rimouski, Quebec
- Country: Canada
- Denomination: Roman Catholic

History
- Status: Active
- Consecrated: 28 May 1853

Architecture
- Heritage designation: Bien culturel du Québec, National Historic Sites of Canada
- Architectural type: Gothic

Administration
- Province: Canada
- Archdiocese: Roman Catholic Archdiocese of Rimouski

St. Germain Cathedral is a Roman Catholic cathedral located in Rimouski (Québec). It is the mother church for the Roman Catholic Archdiocese of Rimouski.

== History ==
The church was raised to the status of cathedral on 15 January 1867 by Jean Langevin, first bishop of Rimouski, and was consecrated on 28 May 1853.

The cathedral was spared from the nuit rouge ("Red Night") on 6 May 1950, when nearly half of the town was burnt down by a fire that started at the Price Brothers Company sawmill. Legend has it that a priest sprinkled holy water around the city's cathedral and that the fire would not cross the line.

== Design ==
The exterior of the cathedral is of neo-Gothic influence with pointed arch windows decorated with stained glass, buttress and pinnacles while the interior is influenced by the Gothic style with its ceiling that looks like a diagonal rib vault. Grey stones were used to build the outside. The main vault is 28 m (90 ft) high and the interior one is 18 m (60 ft) high. Three bells, weighing 1,641 kg in total were installed in 1891. The cathedral is famous for its Casavant Frères organ.

Joseph J.B. Verret (architect) designed the Bishop's Palace (1901-01) for Monseigneur A.A. Blais, of St. Germain Roman Catholic Cathedral.
