= Fecteau =

Fecteau is a surname of French origin. Notable people with the surname include:

- Clément Fecteau (1933–2017), Canadian Roman Catholic prelate
- Jean-Sébastien Fecteau (born 1975), Canadian pair skater
- Richard Fecteau (born 1927), American Central Intelligence Agency agent
- Ryan Fecteau (born 1992), American politician
- Simon Olivier Fecteau (born 1975), Canadian director, actor, producer and screenwriter
- Vincent Fecteau (born 1969), American sculptor

== See also ==
- Air Fecteau, defunct Canadian airline
