= Bertrand Blanchet =

Canadian Roman Catholic bishop (1932–2025)

His Excellency Bertrand Blanchet
- Archbishop Emeritus of Rimouski
- Archdiocese: Rimouski
- Appointed: 16 October 1992
- Term ended: 3 July 2008
- Predecessor: Joseph Gilles Napoléon Ouellet
- Successor: Pierre-André Fournier
- Previous post: Bishop of Gaspé (1973–1992)

Orders
- Ordination: 20 May 1956 by Marius Paré
- Consecration: 8 December 1973 by Maurice Roy, Jean-Marie Fortier and Joseph Gilles Napoléon Ouellet

Personal details
- Born: 19 September 1932 Montmagny, Quebec, Canada
- Died: 23 October 2025 (aged 93) La Pocatière, Quebec, Canada

Bertrand Blanchet (19 September 1932 – 23 October 2025) was a Canadian Roman Catholic prelate.

Born in Montmagny, Quebec, Blanchet was ordained to the priesthood in 1956. He was appointed bishop of Gaspé in 1973. He later served as archbishop of Rimouski from 1992 until his retirement in 2008. Blanchet died on 23 October 2025, at the age of 93.

Catholic Church titles
Preceded by Joseph Gilles Napoléon Ouellet	Archbishop of Rimouski; 1992–2008	Succeeded by Pierre-André Fournier
Preceded by Joseph Gilles Napoléon Ouellet	Bishop of Gaspé; 1973–1992	Succeeded by Raymond Dumais
