= Diocese of Sainte-Anne-de-la-Pocatière =

Catholic ecclesiastical territory

Coordinates: 47.3667°N 70.0333°W

Diocese of Sainte-Anne-de-la-Pocatière Dioecesis Sanctae Annae Pocatierensis
- Logo of the Diocese

Location
- Country: Canada
- Ecclesiastical province: Quebec

Statistics
- Population: Total; Catholics: (as of 2023); 90,916; 85,703 (94.3%)

Information
- Denomination: Roman Catholic
- Rite: Roman Rite
- Established: 23 June 1951
- Cathedral: St. Ann's Cathedral, La Pocatière

Current leadership
- Pope: Leo XIV
- Bishop: sede vacante
- Metropolitan Archbishop: Gérald Lacroix
- Bishops emeritus: Yvon-Joseph Moreau

Website
- esap.ca

The Roman Catholic Diocese of Sainte-Anne-de-la-Pocatière (Latin: Dioecesis Sanctae Annae Pocatierensis) (erected 23 June 1951) is a suffragan of the Archdiocese of Quebec.

== Bishops ==
=== Ordinaries ===
- Bruno Desrochers (1951–1968)
- Charles Henri Lévesque (1968–1984)
- André Gaumond (1985–1995), appointed Coadjutor Archbishop of Sherbrooke, Québec
- Clément Fecteau (1996–2008)
- Yvon-Joseph Moreau (2008–2017)
- Pierre Goudreault (2017–2026)

=== Auxiliary bishops ===
- Louis Joseph Jean Marie Fortier (1960–1965), appointed Bishop of Gaspé, Québec
- Charles Henri Lévesque (1965–1968), appointed Bishop of this diocese

=== Other priest of this diocese who became bishop ===
- Dorylas Moreau, appointed Bishop of Rouyn-Noranda, Québec in 2001

== Bibliography ==
- "Diocese of Sainte-Anne-de-la-Pocatiàre". Catholic-Hierarchy.
