= François-Xavier Ross =

Canadian clergyman and prelate

- Bishop of Gaspé
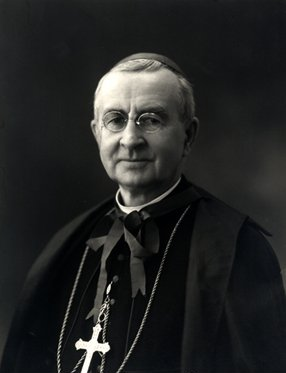
- Church: Catholic Church
- Diocese: Diocese of Gaspé
- In office: 11 December 1922 – 5 July 1945
- Predecessor: Diocese erected
- Successor: Albini LeBlanc

Orders
- Ordination: 19 May 1894 by André-Albert Blais
- Consecration: 1 May 1923 by Pietro di Maria

Personal details
- Born: 7 March 1869 Sainte-Félicité des Grosses-Roches, Quebec, Dominion of Canada, British Empire
- Died: 5 July 1945 (aged 76)

François-Xavier Ross (born 7 March 1869 in Grosses-Roches; died 5 July 1945) was a Canadian clergyman and prelate for the Roman Catholic Diocese of Gaspé. He was appointed bishop in 1922. He died in 1945.
