= Gaétan Proulx =

Canadian Catholic bishop

Gaétan Proulx OSM
- Bishop Emeritus of Gaspé
- Church: Catholic Church
- Diocese: Diocese of Gaspé
- In office: 2 July 2016 – 23 February 2023
- Predecessor: Jean Gagnon
- Successor: Claude Lamoureux
- Previous posts: Titular Bishop of Azura (2011-2016); Auxiliary Bishop of Quebec (2011-2016)

Orders
- Ordination: 8 June 1975 by Jean-Marie Fortier
- Consecration: 25 February 2012 by Gérald Lacroix

Personal details
- Born: 27 May 1947 (age 79) Saint-Denis-de-Brompton, Quebec, Dominion of Canada, British Empire
- Coat of arms

Gaétan Proulx is a bishop of Roman Catholic Archdiocese of Quebec. Born 27 May 1947 in Saint-Denis-de-Brompton, Quebec, he became a Professed Member of the Order of Servants of Mary On 5 Sep 1969 and was ordained a priest on 8 Jun 1975.

On 12 December 2011 he was appointed, by pope Benedict XVI, Auxiliary Bishop of Québec, Canada and Titular Bishop of Azura in North Africa. His principle consecrators were Bishops Paul Lortie, Bishop of Mont-Laurier and Gilles Lemay, Bishop of Amos.
