= André Gaumond =

Canadian Roman Catholic bishop (1936–2019)

- Archbishop of Sherbrooke
- Church: Catholic Church
- Archdiocese: Archdiocese of Sherbrooke
- In office: 1 July 1996 – 26 July 2011
- Predecessor: Jean-Marie Fortier
- Successor: Luc Cyr
- Previous posts: Coadjutor Archbishop of Sherbrooke (1995-1996); Bishop of Sainte-Anne-de-la-Pocatière (1985-1995)

Orders
- Ordination: 27 May 1961 by Bruno Desrochers
- Consecration: 15 August 1985 by Louis-Albert Vachon

Personal details
- Born: 3 June 1936 Montmagny, Quebec, Dominion of Canada, British Empire
- Died: 14 December 2019 (aged 83) Sherbrooke, Quebec, Canada

André Gaumond (3 June 1936 – 14 December 2019) was a Canadian Roman Catholic bishop.

Gaumond was born in Canada and was ordained to the priesthood in 1961. He served as bishop of the Roman Catholic Diocese of Sainte-Anne-de-la-Pocatière, Canada, from 1985 to 1995. He then served as coadjutor archbishop of the Roman Catholic Archdiocese of Sherbrooke, Canada, in 1995 and 1996. Gaumond then served as archbishop of the Sherbrooke Archdiocese from 1996 to 2011.
