= Séminaire de Sherbrooke =

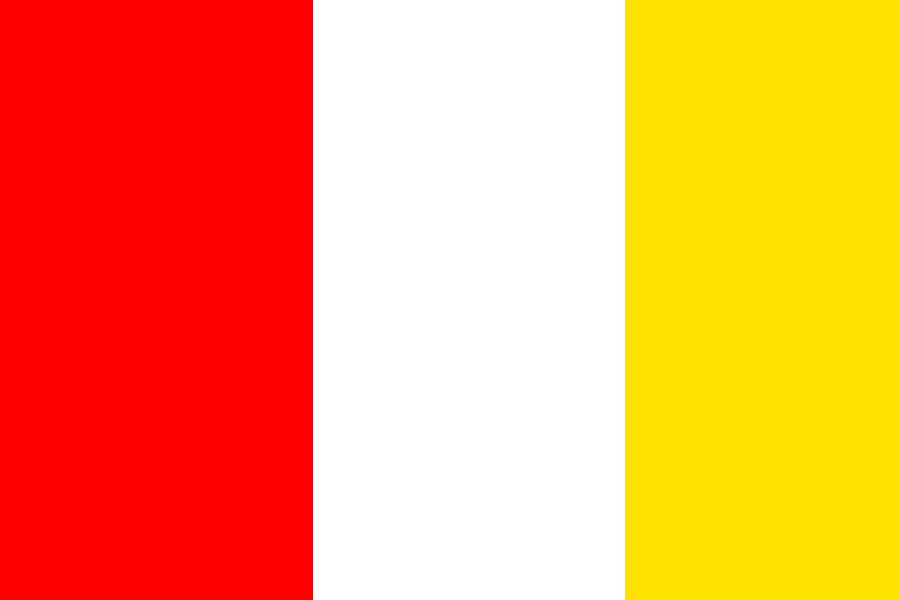

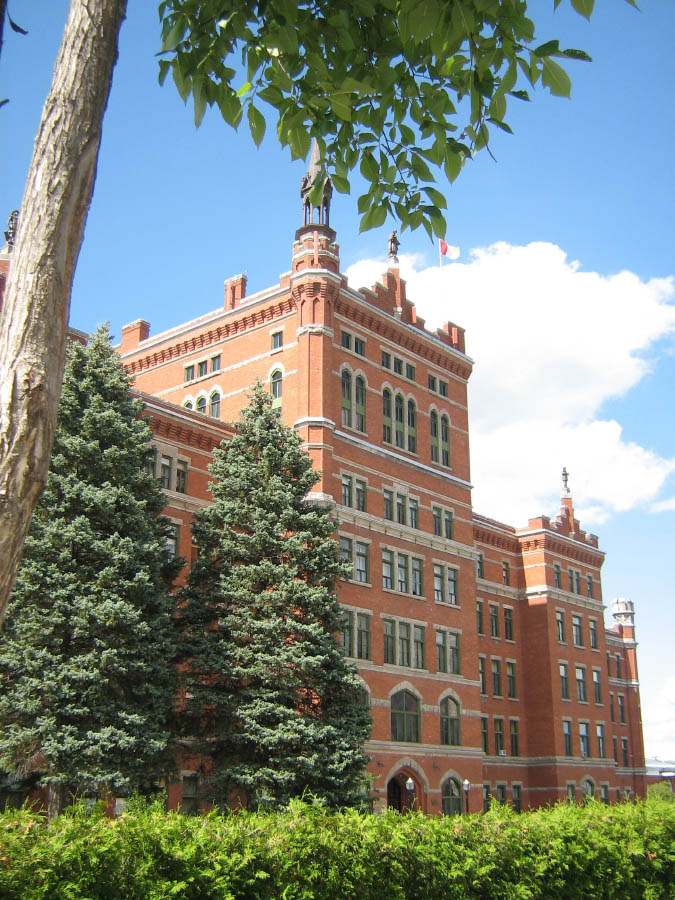

Location
- 195, rue Marquette; Sherbrooke, Quebec, J1H 1L6; Canada
- Coordinates: 45°24′9.74″N 71°53′39″W

Information
- School type: Private Secondary school, College, Vocational education
- Religious affiliation: Catholic
- Founded: 1875
- Administrator: Mr. Jacques Gravel
- Grades: 7-11
- Enrollment: 1,200
- Language: French
- Team name: Barons
- Website: www.seminaire-sherbrooke.qc.ca

The Séminaire de Sherbrooke, also known as Séminaire Saint-Charles-Borromée, is a private educational institution located in Sherbrooke, Quebec, Canada. Today, the Séminaire offers five years of secondary school and several college programs and continuing education.

== History ==
Séminaire Saint-Charles-Borromée (known as St. Charles Seminary in English) was founded by Monseigneur Antoine Racine in 1875, the year after he became the first Bishop of Sherbrooke. A degree granting institution, perhaps its most famous alumnus was Prime Minister of Canada Louis St. Laurent, who graduated in 1902.

In 1954, the original seminary became Université de Sherbrooke. Université de Sherbrooke was the first Roman Catholic and French-language university in the Eastern Townships. Following the establishment of the university, the Séminaire de Sherbrooke was reborn in 1959. In 1968, classical courses (French: cours classique) were abandoned and the institution became the responsibility of the Ministry of Education of Quebec.

In 2005, the charter was amended, the positions of President (originally named by the Diocese of Sherbrooke) and the Director General (secular function) were merged into President and CEO. For the first time since the beginning of its existence, the Séminaire was directed by a layman, André Métras, who had been on the staff of the school in various roles for over 20 years.

== Notable alumni ==
- Tom Cavanagh
