= Albini LeBlanc =

Canadian Catholic bishop

- Bishop of Gaspé
- Church: Catholic Church
- Diocese: Diocese of Gaspé
- In office: 22 December 1945 – 17 May 1957
- Predecessor: François-Xavier Ross
- Successor: Paul Bernier
- Previous post: Bishop of Hearst (1940-1945)

Orders
- Ordination: 15 May 1921 by Edouard Alfred LeBlanc
- Consecration: 11 February 1941 by Louis-Joseph-Arthur Melanson

Personal details
- Born: 1 May 1894 Bouctouche, New Brunswick, Dominion of Canada, British Empire
- Died: 17 May 1957 (aged 63)

Albini LeBlanc (born 1 May 1894 in Bouctouche; died 17 May 1957) was a Canadian clergyman and prelate for the Roman Catholic Diocese of Gaspé. He was appointed bishop in 1940 in Hearst, Ontario, and to his later post in 1945. He died in 1957.
