= Diocese of Gaspé =

Catholic ecclesiastical territory

Coordinates: 48.8310°N 64.4834°W

Diocese of Gaspé Dioecesis Gaspesiensis
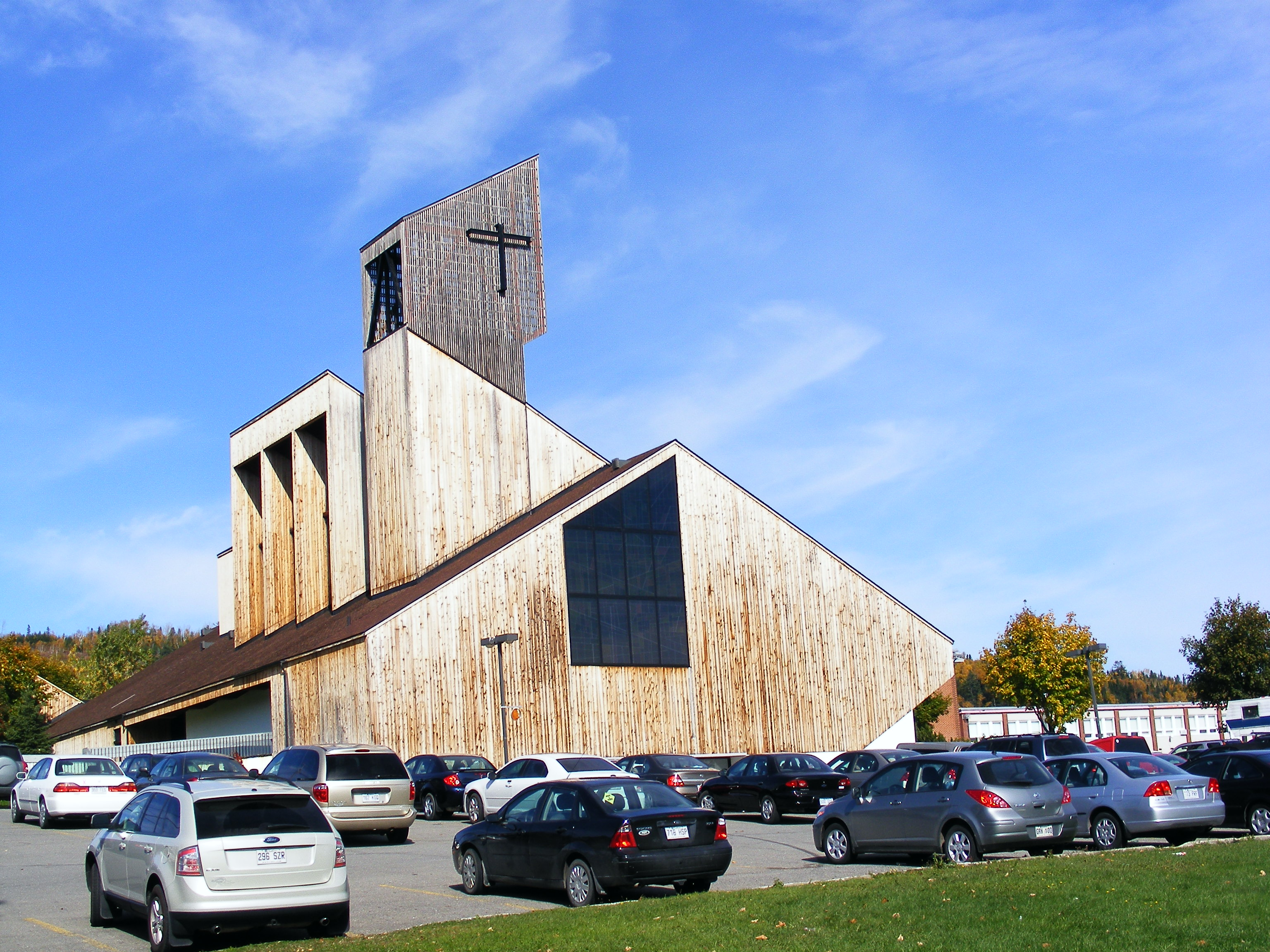
- Cathédrale du Christ-Roi de Gaspé

- Logo of the Diocese

Location
- Country: Canada
- Ecclesiastical province: Quebec
- Population: 83,400 (89.3%)

Information
- Denomination: Roman Catholic
- Rite: Roman Rite
- Established: 5 May 1922
- Cathedral: Cathedrale du Christ-Roi

Current leadership
- Pope: Leo XIV
- Bishop: Claude Lamoureux
- Bishops emeritus: Gaétan Proulx

Website
- Diocèse de Gaspé

The Roman Catholic Diocese of Gaspé (Latin: Dioecesis Gaspesiensis) (erected 5 May 1922) is a suffragan of the Archdiocese of Rimouski in Quebec, Canada.

== Ordinaries ==
- François-Xavier Ross (1922 – 1945)
- Albini LeBlanc (1945 – 1957)
- Paul Bernier (1957 – 1964), Archbishop (personal title)
- Jean-Marie Fortier (1965 – 1968), appointed Archbishop of Sherbrooke, Québec
- Joseph Gilles Napoléon Ouellet, P.M.E. (1968 – 1973)
- Bertrand Blanchet (1973 – 1992), appointed Archbishop of Rimouski, Québec
- Raymond Dumais (1993 – 2001)
- Jean Gagnon (2002 – 2016)
- Gaétan Proulx, O.S.M. (2016–2023)
- Claude Lamoureux (2023–)

== See also ==
- Catholic Church in Canada

== External links and references ==
- Diocese of Gaspé site
- "Diocese of Gaspé". Catholic-Hierarchy.
