= Philippe Desranleau =

Catholic archbishop

- Archbishop of Sherbrooke
- Archdiocese: Sherbrooke
- Installed: 1941
- Term ended: 1952
- Predecessor: Alphonse-Osias Gagnon
- Successor: Georges Cabana

Orders
- Ordination: 1909

Personal details
- Born: April 3, 1882 Saint-Sébastien-d'Iberville, Quebec
- Died: May 28, 1952 (aged 70)

Philippe-Servulo Desranleau (April 3, 1882 – May 28, 1952) was a Canadian Roman Catholic priest and the Archbishop of Sherbrooke from 1951 to 1952.

Born in Saint-Sébastien-d'Iberville, Quebec, Desranleau studied at the Séminaire de Saint-Hyacinthe and the Grand Séminaire de Montréal. He was ordained as a priest in 1909. In 1937, he was appointed Titular Bishop of Sala and a Coadjutor Bishop of Sherbrooke. He was appointed Bishop of Sherbrooke in 1941 and was made the first archbishop in 1951. He served until his death in 1952.
