= St. Ann's Cathedral (La Pocatière) =

Coordinates: 47.3671°N 70.0391°W

- Cathédrale Sainte-Anne de Sainte-Anne-de-la-Pocatière
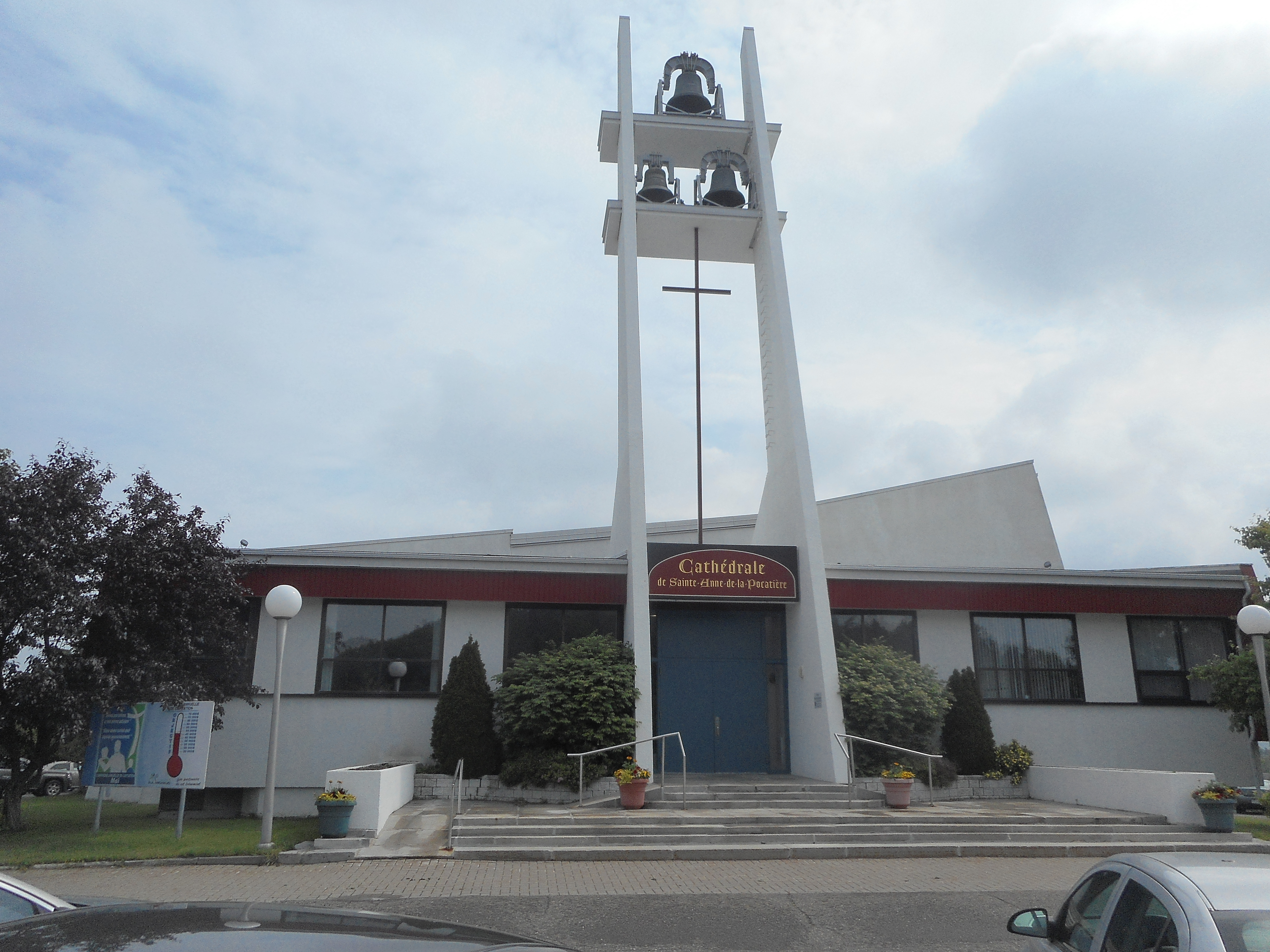
- St. Ann's Cathedral
- Location: La Pocatière; Quebec
- Country: Canada
- Denomination: Roman Catholic Church

The Cathedral of St. Ann (French: Cathédrale Sainte-Anne de Sainte-Anne-de-la-Pocatière) is a Roman Catholic cathedral in La Pocatière, Quebec, the seat of the Diocese of Sainte-Anne-de-la-Pocatière.

The current church is the eighth used by the paroisse Sainte-Anne. The first was built in 1678, in what was then New France in the French colonial empire, and replaced subsequently in 1715, 1735, 1767, 1800, 1845, 1920 and 1950. It is the oldest of about twenty parishes in Quebec dedicated ti St. Ann, the patroness of Quebec.

== See also ==
- Catholic Church in Canada
