= Pierre-André Fournier =

Canadian prelate

The Most Reverend Pierre-André Fournier
- Archbishop of Rimouski
- See: Rimouski
- Installed: September 28, 2008
- Term ended: January 10, 2015
- Predecessor: Bertrand Blanchet
- Successor: Denis Grondin (designate)
- Other post: Auxiliary Bishop of Quebec (2005–2008)

Orders
- Ordination: June 10, 1967
- Consecration: April 10, 2005

Personal details
- Born: June 8, 1943 Plessisville, Quebec
- Died: January 10, 2015 (aged 71) Rimouski, Quebec
- Coat of arms

Pierre-André Fournier (June 8, 1943 – January 10, 2015) was a Canadian prelate of the Roman Catholic Church. He was the sixth Archbishop of Rimouski.

== Biography ==
The third of nine children, Pierre-André Fournier was born to Joseph-Eudore Fournier and Jeannette Marquis in Plessisville, Quebec. He attended Collège Saint-Édouard and Collège de Lévis before entering the Grand Seminary of Quebec in 1963, later earning a Licentiate in Theology from Université Laval. He was ordained to the priesthood by cardinal Maurice Roy on June 10, 1967.

He furthered his studies in English in the United States, after which he earned a Master's degree in pastoral studies from Université de Sherbrooke. He then did pastoral work in the Archdiocese of Quebec, also serving as parish priest of Saint-Roch (1983–1995), member of the Social Affairs Committee of the Assembly of Quebec Catholic Bishops (1987–1993), and parish administrator of Saint-Pascal-de-Maizerets (1995–1997). From 1998 to 2003, he was parish priest of Notre-Dame-de-Foy, Saint-Denys, Sainte-Geneviève, and Saint-Mathieu. In August 2003, he became pastoral director and episcopal vicar of the Quebec Archdiocese.

On February 11, 2005, Fournier was appointed Auxiliary Bishop of Quebec and Titular Bishop of Diana by Pope John Paul II. He received his episcopal consecration on the following April 10 from Marc Cardinal Ouellet, P.S.S., with Bishops Jean-Pierre Blais and Eugène Tremblay serving as co-consecrators. He was later named Archbishop of Rimouski by Pope Benedict XVI on July 3, 2008, and was installed as such on the following September 28. He received the pallium, a vestment worn by metropolitan bishops, from Benedict XVI on June 29, 2009.

In 2011 he was elected president of the Assembly of Quebec Catholic Bishops. He died in January 2015.

== See also ==
Catholic Church titles
Preceded by Bertrand Blanchet	Archbishop of Rimouski; 2008—2015	Succeeded by Denis Grondin (designate)
