= Jean Gagnon (bishop) =

Canadian Roman Catholic bishop

- Bishop of Gaspé
- Church: Catholic Church
- Diocese: Diocese of Gaspé
- In office: 15 November 2002 – 2 July 2016
- Predecessor: Raymond Dumais
- Successor: Gaétan Proulx
- Previous posts: Apostolic Administrator of Gaspé (2001-2002); Titular Bishop of Lamdia (1998-2002); Auxiliary Bishop of Quebec (1998-2002)

Orders
- Ordination: 4 June 1966
- Consecration: 19 March 1999 by Maurice Couture

Personal details
- Born: 21 May 1941 Saint-Joseph-de-Lauzon (in present-day Lévis), Quebec, Dominion of Canada, British Empire
- Died: 23 December 2016 (aged 75) Lévis, Quebec, Canada
- Coat of arms

Jean Gagnon (21 May 1941 – 23 December 2016) was the Roman Catholic bishop of the Roman Catholic Diocese of Gaspé, Quebec, Canada.

Ordained to the priesthood in 1966, Gagnon was named bishop in 1998 and retired in 2016, five months before his death.

== See also ==
- Catholic Church in Canada
