= Secular Institute Pius X =

Catholic institution in Quebec, Canada

Secular Institute of Pius X
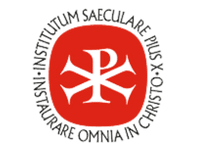
- Logo
- Abbreviation: I.S.P.X.
- Formation: 1939; 87 years ago
- Founder: Fr. Henri Roy, I.S.P.X.
- Type: Clerical Secular Institute of Consecrated Life of Diocesan Right (for Men)
- Headquarters: 1645, 80e rue Est, C.P. 7731, Charlesbourg, QC G1G 5W6, Canada
- Director General: Fr. Marcel Caron, I.S.P.X.
- Website: http://www.ispx.org/

The Secular Institute Pius X, or Pius X Secular Institute (ISPX), is a Catholic men's clerical secular institute of consecrated life of diocesan right headquartered in Charlesbourg, Quebec City, Canada.

== History ==
It was established by Henri Roy in 1939 in Manchester, New Hampshire. A secular institute is an organization of individuals who are consecrated persons (professing the evangelical counsels of chastity, poverty and obedience) and live in the world, unlike members of a religious institute, who live in community.

== Superiors general ==
(incomplete?; so far, Latin Church Canadians)

- Henri Roy, founder
- General Director Gérald Cyprien Lacroix (later Cardinal, see below) (2001 – 2009.04.07)
- General Director Christian Beaulieu (2010 – ...)

== Prelates from their ranks ==
- Gérald Cyprien Lacroix, General Director (see above), then Titular Bishop of Hilta (2009.04.07 – 2011.02.22) & Auxiliary Bishop of Quebec City (Canada) (2009.04.07 – 2011.02.22), promoted Metropolitan Archbishop of Québec (Canada) (2011.02.22 – ...), created Cardinal-Priest of S. Giuseppe all’Aurelio (2014)
