= Antoine Racine =

Catholic bishop

- Sherbrooke
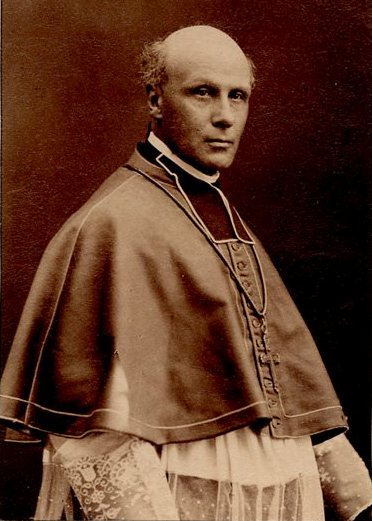
- Archdiocese: Sherbrooke
- Installed: September 1, 1874
- Term ended: July 17, 1893
- Predecessor: Diocese erected on August 28, 1874
- Successor: Paul LaRocque

Orders
- Ordination: September 12, 1844

Personal details
- Born: January 26, 1822 Saint-Ambroise (Loretteville), Lower Canada
- Died: July 17, 1893 (aged 71) Sherbrooke, Quebec

Antoine Racine (French pronunciation: [ɑ̃twan ʁasin]; January 26, 1822 – July 17, 1893) was a Canadian Roman Catholic priest and the 1st Bishop of Sherbrooke from 1874 to 1893. He is buried in the Cathedral in Sherbrooke.

Séminaire Saint-Charles-Borromée (known as St. Charles Seminary in English) was founded by Racine in 1875, the year after he became the first Bishop of Sherbrooke. A degree-granting institution, perhaps its most famous alumnus was Prime Minister of Canada Louis St. Laurent, who graduated in 1902.

He is the namesake of Saint-Antoine-de-Padoue parish, also known as St-Antoine-de-Lennoxville.
