= Alphonse-Osias Gagnon =

Canadian Roman Catholic bishop

- Sherbrooke
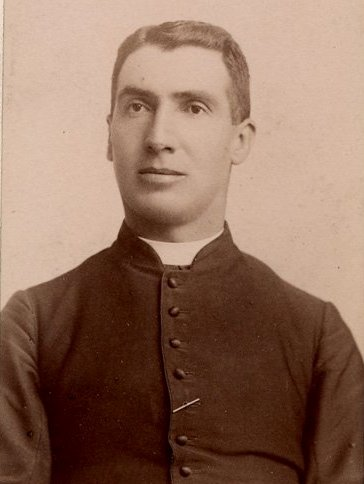
- Archdiocese: Sherbrooke
- Installed: June 23, 1927
- Term ended: February 12, 1941
- Predecessor: Paul LaRocque
- Successor: Philippe Desranleau

Orders
- Ordination: July 8, 1883

Personal details
- Born: December 31, 1860 Bonsecours, Canada East
- Died: February 12, 1941 (aged 80)

Alphonse-Osias Gagnon (December 31, 1860 – February 12, 1941) was a Canadian Roman Catholic priest and Bishop of Sherbrooke from 1927 to 1941.

== Biography ==
Born in Bonsecours, Canada East, Gagnon studied at the Séminaire Saint-Charles-Borromée de Sherbrooke from 1875 to 1880. He was ordained a priest in 1883. From 1895 to 1897, he studied in Paris where he received a Master of Arts degree. Returning to Canada, he held different teaching positions at the Séminaire. In 1923, he was appointed Titular Bishop of Pegae and was appointed Bishop of Sherbrooke in 1927. He served until his death in 1941.
