= Denis Grondin =

Canadian bishop

- Archbishop of Rimouski
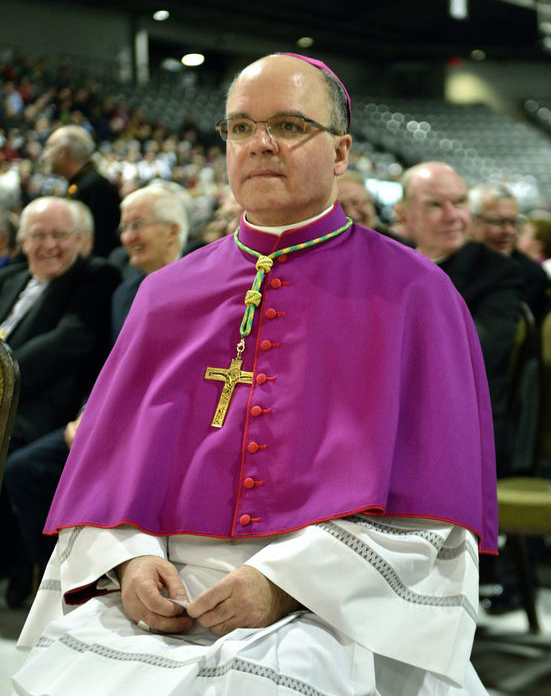
- Grondin in 2015
- Church: Catholic Church
- Archdiocese: Archdiocese of Rimouski
- Appointed: 4 May 2015
- Predecessor: Pierre-André Fournier
- Previous posts: Titular Bishop of Camplum (2011-2015); Auxiliary Bishop of Quebec (2011-2015)

Orders
- Ordination: 21 May 1989 by Louis-Albert Vachon
- Consecration: 25 February 2012 by Gérald Lacroix

Personal details
- Born: 23 October 1954 (age 71) Rimouski, Quebec, Dominion of Canada, British Empire
- Coat of arms

Denis Grondin (born 23 October 1954) is a Canadian Roman Catholic prelate.

Born in Rimouski, Quebec, Grondin was ordained to the priesthood in 1989. He served as an auxiliary bishop of the Quebec archdiocese from 2011 until 2015, when he was appointed archbishop of his hometown Rimouski.
