= San Giuseppe all'Aurelio =

- St. Joseph at Aurelio; Sancti Iosephi in regione Aurelia
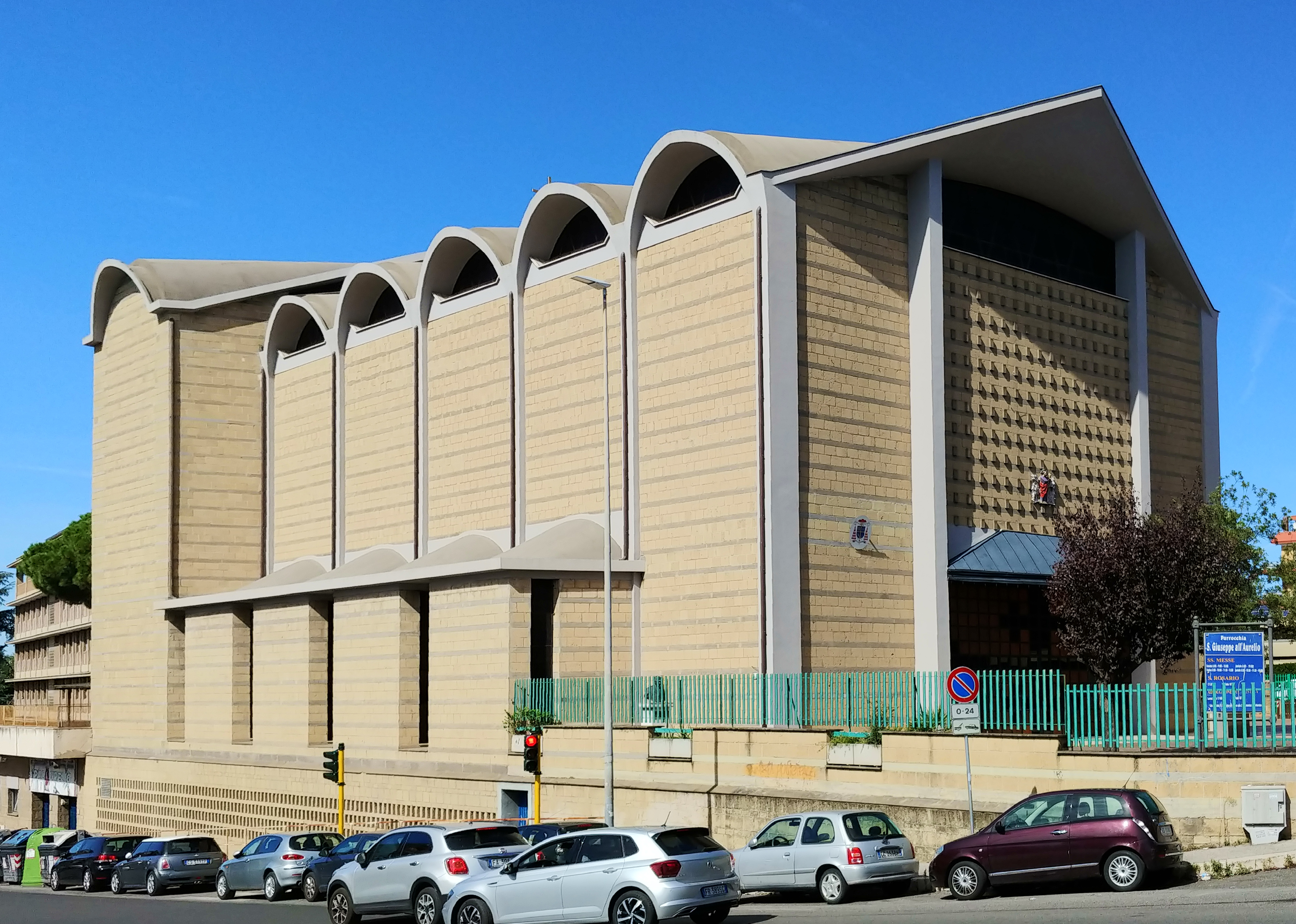
- Façade
- Click on the map for a fullscreen view
- 41°54′12″N 12°24′46″E
- Location: Via Giuseppe Marello 5/13, Rome
- Country: Italy
- Denomination: Roman Catholic
- Tradition: Roman Rite

History
- Status: Titular church
- Dedication: Saint Joseph

Architecture
- Architect: Ildo Avetta
- Architectural type: Church
- Style: Modernist
- Groundbreaking: 1961

Administration
- District: Lazio
- Province: Rome

San Giuseppe all'Aurelio is a church in Rome, in Primavalle district via Boccea.

== History ==
It was built in 1970 by architect Ildo Avetta and dedicated to St. Joseph Marello. The church was erected as a parish on June 19, 1961 by decree of the Cardinal Vicar Clemente Micara Quotidianis curis, and entrusted to the Oblates of St. Joseph. It has been the seat of the cardinal's title of San Giuseppe all'Aurelio since 1991.

== Description ==
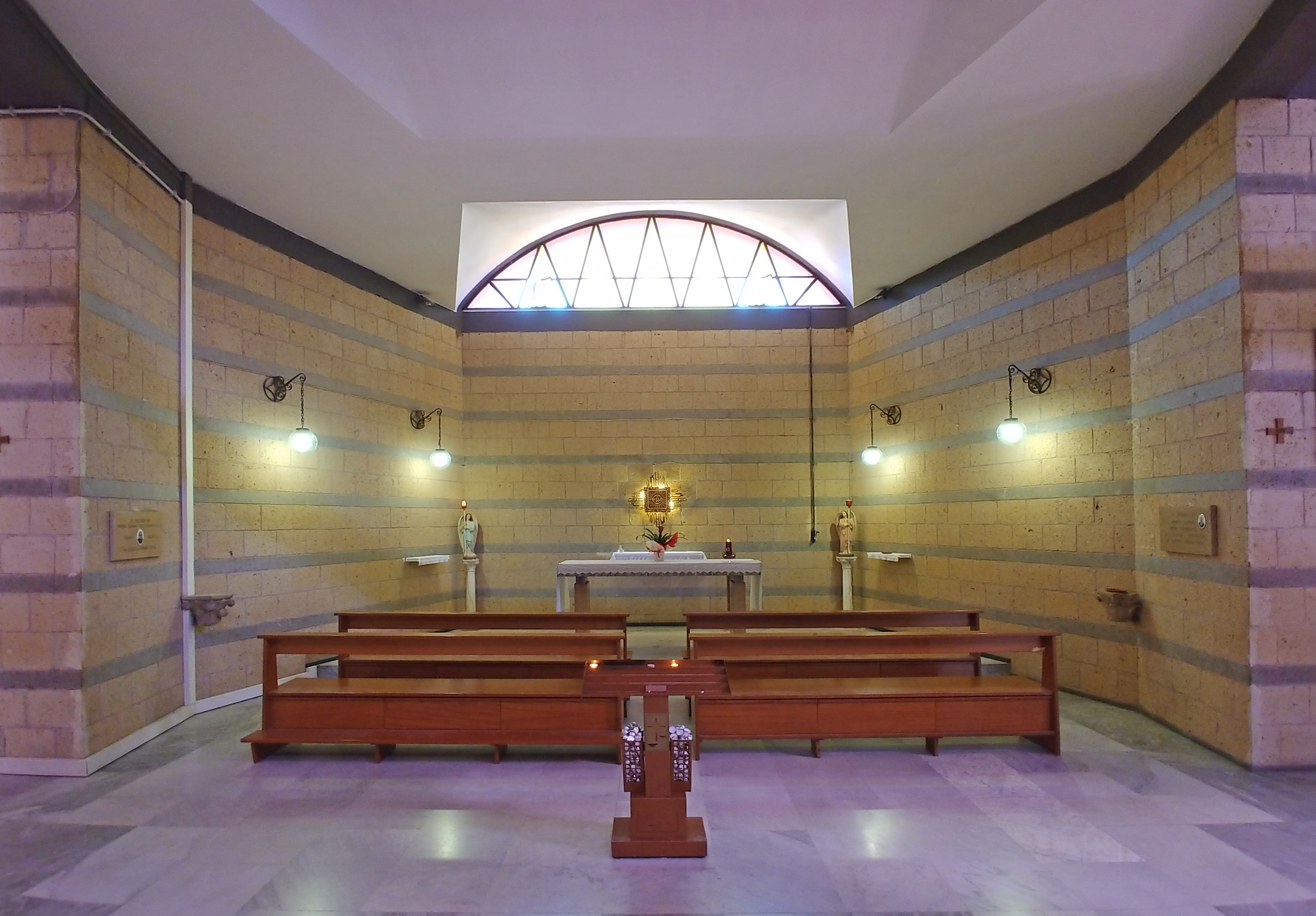
Altar

The facade is divided into three sections by pilasters made of tufa concrete. The entrance is topped by a ceramic depicting St. Joseph and Child with Angels. The interior has a nave with side aisles. In the apse is a tapestry depicting Saint Joseph and the Christ Child, completed in 1915, from the Restoration Laboratory of the Vatican Tapestries, where he lay abandoned. There is a Via Crucis which was made by Vasco Nasorri as well as a great ceramics (1986) and the apse, with the representation of an illuminated manuscript opened. At the main altar is a Last Supper by E. Hortis in 1981.

== List of Cardinal-priests ==
- Georg Sterzinsky 28 June 1991 - 30 June 2011
- Gerald Lacroix 22 February 2014 - present
