= Daughters of Charity of the Sacred Heart of Jesus =

French Catholic congregation

Daughters of Charity of the Sacred Heart of Jesus (French: Filles de la Charité du Sacré-Coeur de Jésus, FCSCJ) is a French Catholic congregation established in 1823 by Jean-Maurice Catroux and Rose Giet.

The sisters currently serve as educators, healthcare workers, and pastoral care ministers in nine countries.

== History ==
Jean-Maurice Catroux was born on 3 October 1794 and ordained on 19 December 1818. On 28 December 1820, he became the pastor at La Salle-de-Vihiers.

Rose Giet was born on 3 December 1784. She worked as an educator and recruited other young women to join her efforts in educating children and caring for the sick. FCSCJ was founded on 18 December 1823, when Giet became a professed religious and took the name Sister Marie. The work of Catroux and Giet spread to Anjou, Poitou, and Nantes.

The congregation developed rapidly until 1902, when the French government expelled religious authorities from schools. Some members chose to take up secular garb, while others left France. In 1905, four sisters moved to Newport, Vermont. In 1911 Bishop Paul LaRocque created a Canadian novitiate in Sherbrooke, Quebec.

In 1960, FCSCJ established an American novitiate in Littleton, New Hampshire. The building became an extended care facility ten years later. It now houses the central administration for the congregation in New England, New York, and Louisiana. The congregation also maintains a presence with the Roman Catholic Dioceses of Ogdensburg and Durban.
