= Archdiocese of Rimouski =

Catholic ecclesiastical territory

Coordinates: 48.4507°N 68.5274°W

Archdiocese of Rimouski Archidioecesis Sancti Germani

Location
- Country: Canada
- Population: 147,000 (98.1%)

Information
- Denomination: Catholic
- Sui iuris church: Latin Church
- Rite: Roman Rite
- Cathedral: Saint-Germain Cathedral

Current leadership
- Pope: Leo XIV
- Archbishop: Denis Grondin

Website
- dioceserimouski.com

The Roman Catholic Archdiocese of Rimouski (Latin: Archidioecesis Sancti Germani) is a Roman Catholic archdiocese that includes part of the Province of Quebec, Canada, and includes the suffragan dioceses of Baie-Comeau and Gaspé.

As of 2018, the archdiocese contains 97 parishes, 74 active diocesan priests, 5 religious priests, and 148,320 Catholics. It also has 453 Women Religious, 23 Religious Brothers, and 14 permanent deacons.

== Bishops ==
=== Diocesan bishops ===
The following is a list of the bishops and archbishops of Rimouski and their terms of service:

- Jean-Pierre-François Laforce-Langevin (1867–1891)
- André-Albert Blais (1891–1919)
- Joseph-Romuald Léonard (1919–1926)
- Georges-Alexandre Courchesne (1928–1950)
- Charles Eugène Parent (1951–1967)
- Louis Lévesque (1967–1973)
- Joseph Gilles Napoléon Ouellet (1973–1992)
- Bertrand Blanchet (1992–2008)
- Pierre-André Fournier (2008–2015)
- Denis Grondin (2015–present)

=== Coadjutor bishops ===
- André-Albert Blais (1889-1891)
- Louis Lévesque (1964-1967)

=== Auxiliary bishop ===
- Charles Eugène Parent (1944-1951), appointed Archbishop here

=== Other priests of this diocese who became bishops ===
- Gérard Couturier, appointed Bishop of Golfe St-Laurent, Québec in 1956
- Raymond Dumais, appointed Bishop of Gaspé, Québec in 1993
