= Georges Cabana =

Canadian Roman Catholic priest

- Archbishop of Sherbrooke
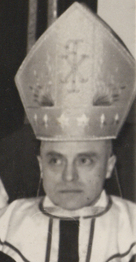
- Diocese: Sherbrooke
- Installed: May 28, 1952
- Term ended: February 7, 1967
- Predecessor: Philippe Desranleau
- Successor: Jean-Marie Fortier

Orders
- Ordination: July 28, 1918

Personal details
- Born: October 23, 1894 Granby, Quebec
- Died: February 6, 1986 (aged 91) Sherbrooke, Quebec
- Denomination: Roman Catholic

Georges Cabana (October 23, 1894 – February 6, 1986) was a Canadian Roman Catholic priest and Archbishop of Sherbrooke from 1952 to 1967.

Born in Granby, Quebec, Cabana studied at the Séminaire Saint-Charles-Borromée de Sherbrooke, Séminaire de Saint-Hyacinthe, and the Grand Séminaire de Montréal. He was ordained a priest in 1918. In 1941, he was made Titular Archbishop of Anchialus and was Coadjutor Archbishop of Saint-Boniface, Manitoba.

In 1952, he was appointed Coadjutor Archbishop of Sherbrooke and became the Archbishop of Sherbrooke in 1952. He attended the Second Vatican Council and was a member of the Coetus Internationalis Patrum.

He resigned in 1967 and was appointed Titular Archbishop of Succuba. He died in 1986.
