= Paul Bernier =

Canadian prelate

- (Arch)Bishop of Gaspé
- Church: Catholic Church
- Diocese: Diocese of Gaspé
- In office: 9 September 1957 – 21 November 1964
- Predecessor: Albini LeBlanc
- Successor: Jean-Marie Fortier
- Previous posts: Apostolic Nuncio to Costa Rica (1952-1955); Titular Archbishop of Laodicea in Syria (1952-1957); Apostolic Nuncio to Panama (1952-1957)

Orders
- Ordination: 17 June 1928 by Felix-Raymond-Marie Rouleau
- Consecration: 12 September 1952 by James McGuigan

Personal details
- Born: 18 January 1906 Quebec City, Quebec, Dominion of Canada, British Empire
- Died: 21 November 1964 (aged 58) Rome, Italy

Paul Bernier (18 January 1906 – 21 November 1964) was a Canadian prelate of the Catholic Church who worked in the Archdiocese of Quebec and international organization, served briefly in the diplomatic service of the Holy See, and then as Bishop of Gaspé from 1957 to 1964.

== Biography ==
Paul Bernier was born on 18 January 1906 in Quebec City, Canada. He attended the local seminary and earned a bachelor's degree in 1924, a licentiate in philosophy in 1925, and a doctorate in theology in 1928. He was ordained a priest in 1928. He became chancellor of the Archdiocese of Quebec and vice chair of its ecclesiastical tribunal. He was secretary of the French section of the Pontifical Missionary Union and then President of the Interamerican Committee for Broadcasting from 1942 to 1947. He taught at Laval University from 1939 to 1947. He joined the staff of the Secretariat of State in 1947.

On 7 August 1952, Pope Pius XII appointed him titular archbishop of Laodicea in Syria and Apostolic Nuncio to Costa Rica and Apostolic Nuncio to Panama. He received his episcopal consecration on 12 September 1952 from Cardinal James Charles McGuigan, Archbishop of Toronto.

He was replaced in Costa Rica by Giuseppe Maria Sensi on 21 May 1955, having left it in the care of the chargé d'affaires Egano Lambertini as of 22 December 1953.

On 9 September 1957, Pope Pius named him Bishop of Gaspé with the personal title of archbishop. He was the first Francophone elected president of the Canadian Conference of Catholic Bishops, serving from 1958 to 1960.

Bernier had a heart attack on 21 November 1964 just before the start of the closing meeting of the third session of the Second Vatican Council. He died in the first aid station of Saint Peter's Basilica and Pope Paul VI led prayers for him when his death was announced at the end of the meeting. He was 58.
