= Paul LaRocque =

Canadian Roman Catholic priest

- Sherbrooke
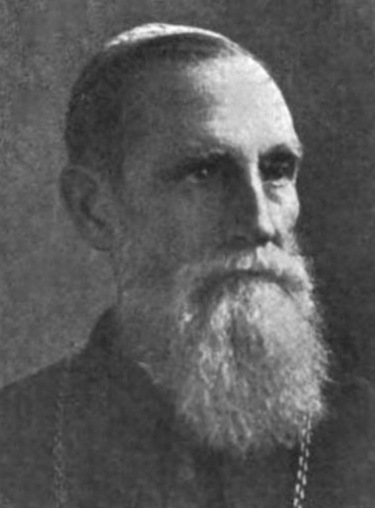
- Archdiocese: Sherbrooke
- Installed: October 6, 1893
- Term ended: August 15, 1926
- Predecessor: Antoine Racine
- Successor: Alphonse-Osias Gagnon

Orders
- Ordination: May 9, 1869

Personal details
- Born: October 27, 1846 Sainte-Marie-de-Monnoir (Marieville), Lower Canada
- Died: August 15, 1926 (aged 79) Sherbrooke, Quebec

Paul La Rocque, also known as Paul-Stanislas LaRocque (October 27, 1846 – August 15, 1926) was a Canadian Roman Catholic priest and Bishop of Sherbrooke from 1893 to 1926.

== Life ==
Paul La Rocque was born October 27, 1846 in Sainte-Marie-de-Monnoir, Lower Canada. He attended the Petit Séminaire de Sainte-Thérèse and the Séminaire de Saint-Hyacinthe. He was ordained in the chapel of the Hôtel-Dieu in Montreal on May 9, 1869 by Bishop Charles La Rocque, a distant cousin. Not being of particularly robust health, he was then sent as a missionary to Key West, Florida to build up his strength. There he became fluent English. In 1880, he was sent to study in Rome, where he earned doctorates in theology and canon law. La Rocque returned to Saint-Hyacinthe in 1884 and a year later was appointed curé of Saint-Michel Cathedral. He used to lead an annual pilgrimage of 1,000 pilgrims to the shrine of Sainte-Anne-de-Beaupré.

On September 24, 1893, La Rocque was appointed the second bishop of Sherbrooke. He learned of this two days later in Chicago, while visiting the offices of the Chicago Daily News. He received episcopal ordination on November 30, 1893 at Saint-Michel Cathedral. During his tenure, thirty-seven new parishes were established. La Rocque made a pastoral visitation of the parishes every three years. As bishop, he opposed mixed marriages and the practice of Catholic children attending Protestant schools. In 1909, he founded Saint-Vincent-de-Paul Hospital in Sherbrooke.

In 1895, he invited The Little Sisters of the Holy Family to establish their motherhouse in Sherbrooke. In 1907, the Filles de la Charité du Sacré-Cœur de Jésus established a house in the diocese, and in 1911, he helped them form a novitiate at Sherbrooke. In 1901 the Benedictines of the Abbey of Saint Wandrille in Normandy were expelled under the "Association Laws" by the French government, and found refuge in Belgium. In 1912, the Abbey of Saint-Benoît-du-Lac was established near Lake Memphremagog. In 1919, La Rocque established the Soeurs Missionnaires Notre-Dame-des-Anges religious community in Lennoxville.

He died August 15, 1926 in Sherbrooke.
