= Archdiocese of Sherbrooke =

Catholic ecclesiastical territory

Coordinates: 45.4027°N 71.8928°W

Archdiocese of Sherbrooke Archidioecesis Sherbrookensis
- Logo of the Diocese

Location
- Country: Canada
- Ecclesiastical province: Sherbrooke
- Population: 304,000 (89.9%)

Information
- Denomination: Catholic
- Sui iuris church: Latin Church
- Rite: Roman Rite
- Cathedral: Saint-Michel Basilica-Cathedral

Current leadership
- Pope: Leo XIV
- Archbishop: Guy Boulanger
- Bishops emeritus: Luc Cyr

Website
- diocesedesherbrooke.org

The Roman Catholic Archdiocese of Sherbrooke (Latin: Archidioecesis Sherbrookensis) is a Roman Catholic archdiocese that includes part of the civil province of Quebec and includes the suffragan dioceses of Nicolet and Saint-Hyacinthe.

As of 2004, the archdiocese contains 107 parishes, 195 active diocesan priests, 107 religious priests, and 291,000 Catholics. It also has 1,012 women religious, 197 religious brothers, and 18 permanent deacons.

== History ==
By 1830, Irish and French Canadian Catholics in the area worshipped at a small chapel dedicated to St. Columban. In 1874, the Diocese of Sherbrooke was created from the Roman Catholic Archdiocese of Quebec. Antoine Racine was appointed the first bishop. The following year, Racine founded the Séminaire Saint-Charles-Borromée, where he taught theology for a number of years.

== Leadership ==
=== Ordinaries ===
==== Bishops (1874–1951) ====
The list of bishops and their terms of service:

- Antoine Racine (1874–1893)
- Paul LaRocque (1893–1926)
- Alphonse-Osias Gagnon (1927–1941)
- Philippe Desranleau (1941–1951 see below)

==== Archbishops (from 1951) ====
The list of archbishops and their terms of service:

- Philippe Desranleau (1951 see above – 1952)
- Georges Cabana (1952–1967)
- Jean-Marie Fortier (1968–1996)
- André Gaumond (1996–2011)
- Luc Cyr (2011–2025)
- Guy Boulanger (2026–present)

=== Coadjutor bishops ===
- Georges Cabana (1952)
- André Gaumond (1995–1996)

=== Auxiliary bishop ===
- Alphonse-Osias Gagnon (1923–1927), appointed Bishop here

=== Other priests of this diocese who became bishops ===
- Donald Lapointe, appointed Auxiliary Bishop of Saint-Jérôme, Québec in 2002
- Daniel Jodoin, appointed Bishop of Bathurst in Canada, New Brunswick in 2013
