= Gilles Ouellet =

Canadian Roman Catholic archbishop (1922–2009)

Joseph Gilles Napoléon Ouellet P.M.E.
- Archbishop of Rimouski
- Archdiocese: Rimouski
- Installed: 1973
- Term ended: 1992
- Predecessor: Louis Lévesque
- Successor: Bertrand Blanchet
- Other post: Bishop of Gaspé (1968-1973)

Personal details
- Born: August 14, 1922 Bromptonville, Quebec, Canada
- Died: August 13, 2009 (aged 86)

Joseph Gilles Napoléon Ouellet P.M.E. (August 14, 1922 – August 13, 2009) was a Canadian Roman Catholic prelate who served as an Archbishop of the Roman Catholic Archdiocese of Rimouski in Rimouski, Quebec, from his appointment on April 27, 1973, until his retirement on October 16, 1992. He remained Archbishop Emeritus of Rimouski until his death in 2009.

Ouellet was born in Bromptonville, Quebec, Canada, which is now part of Brompton, on August 14, 1922. He was Bishop of Gaspé from 1968 until 1975.

He died on August 13, 2009, at the age of 86, one day before his 87th birthday.
