= Gérald Lacroix =

Canadian Catholic prelate

His Eminence Gérald Lacroix ISPX
- Cardinal, Archbishop of Quebec; Primate of Canada
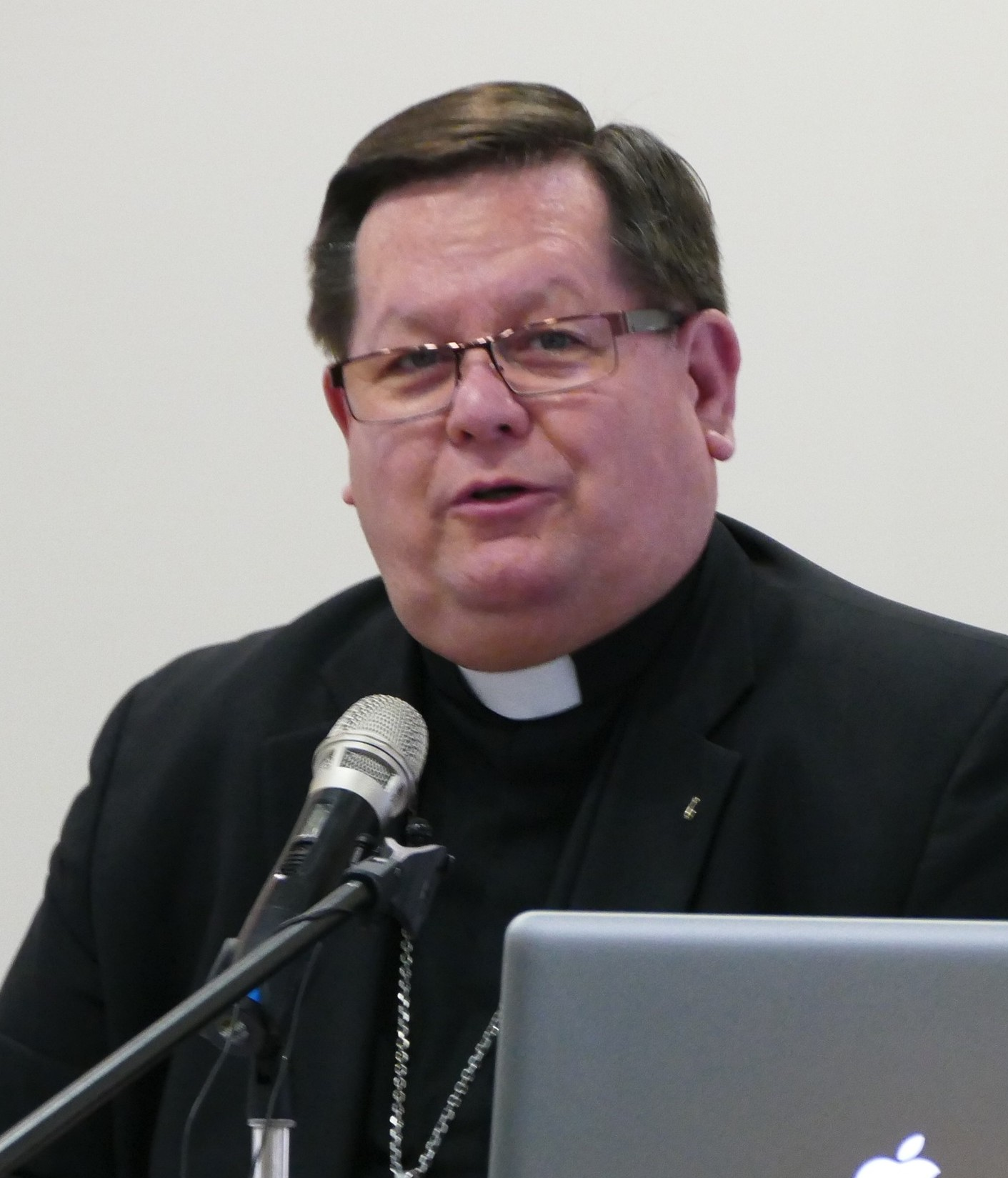
- Church: Catholic Church
- Archdiocese: Quebec
- Appointed: 22 February 2011
- Installed: 25 March 2011
- Predecessor: Marc Ouellet
- Other post: Cardinal Priest of San Giuseppe all'Aurelio
- Previous posts: Auxiliary Bishop of Quebec (2009–2011); Titular Bishop of Hilta (2009–2011)

Orders
- Ordination: 8 October 1988 by Maurice Couture
- Consecration: 24 May 2009 by Marc Ouellet
- Created cardinal: 22 February 2014 by Pope Francis
- Rank: Cardinal-Priest

Personal details
- Born: 27 July 1957 (age 69) Saint-Hilaire-de-Dorset, Quebec, Canada
- Parents: Brigitte Laurendeau & Raymond Lacroix
- Education: Saint Anselm College; Université Laval
- Motto: Mane nobiscum Domine (Stay with us, Lord)

Styles of Gérald Cyprien Lacroix
- Reference style: His Eminence
- Spoken style: Your Eminence
- Religious style: Cardinal
- Informal style: Cardinal

Ordination history of Gérald Lacroix
History
Episcopal consecration
- Principal consecrator: Marc Ouellet
- Co-consecrators: Maurice Couture; Gilles Lemay
Cardinalate
- Elevated by: Pope Francis
Episcopal succession
Bishops consecrated by Gérald Lacroix as principal consecrator
- Gaetan Proulx, OSM: 25 February 2012
- Denis Grondin: 25 February 2012
- Héctor Felipe Vila: 7 February 2016
- Louis Corriveau: 8 December 2016
- Marc Pelchat: 8 December 2016

Gérald Cyprien Lacroix ISPX ([lakʁwa]; born July 27, 1957) is a Canadian Catholic prelate who has served as Archbishop of Quebec and Primate of Canada since 2011. He was previously Auxiliary Bishop of Quebec from 2009 to 2011. A member of the Council of Cardinals and the Secular Institute Pius X, he was made a cardinal in 2014.

== Early life ==
Lacroix was born on 27 July 1957 in Saint-Hilaire-de-Dorset in the Archdiocese of Quebec and completed his secondary and higher education at Trinity High School in Manchester, New Hampshire, and Saint Anselm College in the neighbouring town of Goffstown. He then studied for his theological training at Université Laval, obtaining a Bachelor of Arts degree in theology. He continued with a master's degree in pastoral theology. In 1975 he was accepted at the Pius X Secular Institute and took perpetual vows in 1982.

== Priesthood ==
In 1982, Lacroix became Secretary General of the institute, and since 1985 has been Director of the General Council. From 1985 to 1987, he was appointed general manager of the institute's Christian formation and spiritual centre. He was ordained priest on 8 October 1988 by Archbishop Maurice Couture in the Parish of Notre-Dame-de-la-Récouvrance.

From 1990 to 2000, Lacroix worked in Colombia, where he opened new houses of the institute. From 2001 to 2004, he was Director General of the institute, and re-elected for five years from 2005 to 2010.

== Episcopacy ==
Lacroix was appointed Titular Bishop of Ilta and Auxiliary Bishop of Quebec on 7 April 2009, and received episcopal consecration on 24 May with Marc Ouellet as principal consecrator, the principal co-consecrators being Maurice Couture and Gilles Lemay.

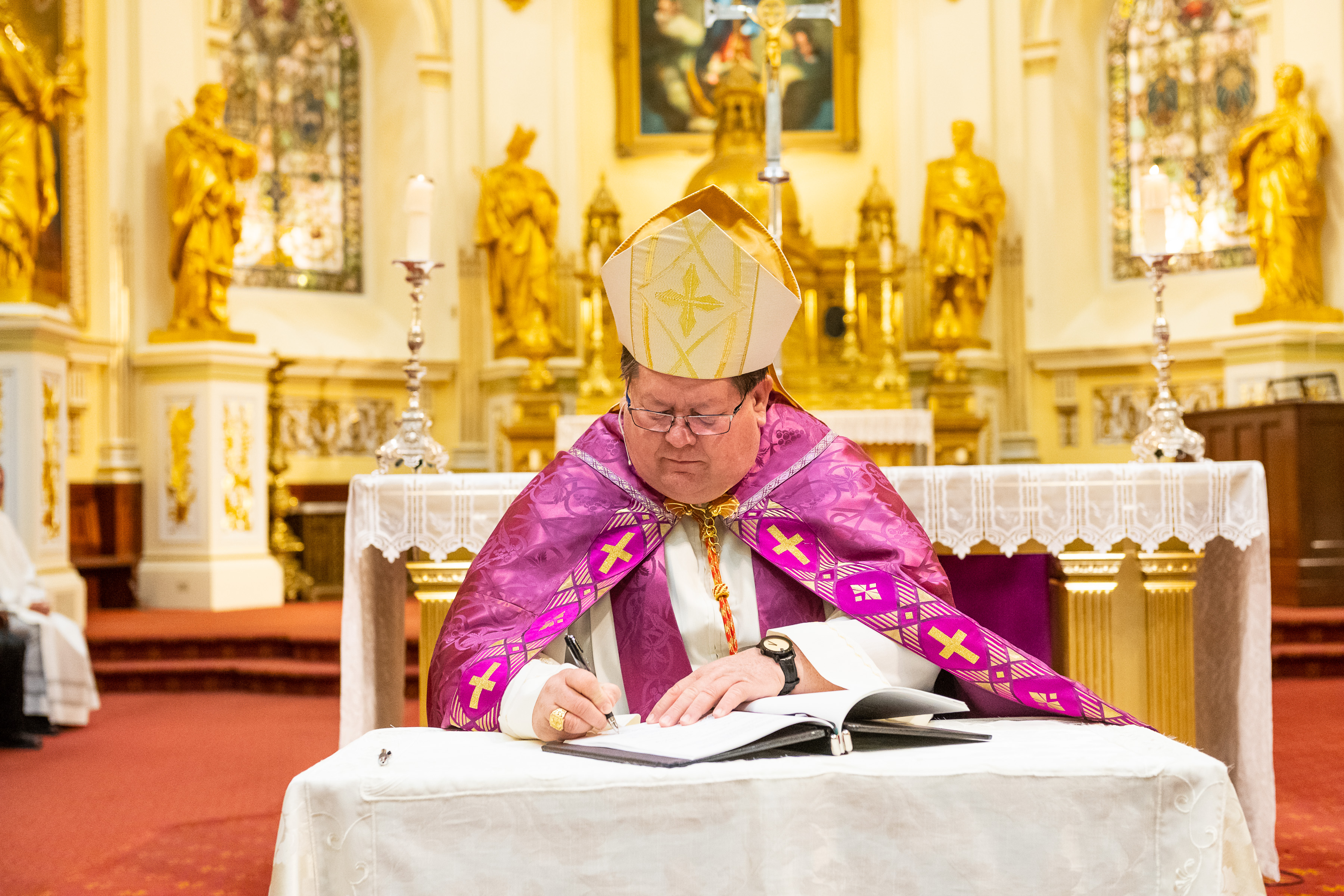
Lacroix as Archbishop of Quebec, 2019

On 22 February 2011, Lacroix was appointed Archbishop of Quebec and Primate of Canada, replacing Marc Ouellet, who had been appointed Prefect of the Congregation for Bishops on 30 June 2010. During the sede vacante period after the death of Pope John Paul II, Lacroix was elected diocesan administrator by the College of Consultors. He is currently one of the co-chairmen of the Committee on Life and Family of the Canadian Conference of Catholic Bishops. After his appointment, Lacroix said that he would continue the work of Ouellet and re-evangelize the province. Lacroix noted that he favours a discussion-based approach. "I'm going to be different. One thing is certain: I will preach the Gospel. If people expect something else, they'll be disappointed", he said.

Lacroix received an honorary doctorate in divinity from Saint Anselm College at the college's 118th commencement exercises held on 21 May 2011. He was also the commencement speaker.

Lacroix received the pallium from Pope Benedict on 29 June 2011, the Feast of Saints Peter and Paul in Rome along with all other metropolitan archbishops appointed since 2010. He was elevated to the College of Cardinals by Pope Francis at the consistory on 22 February 2014.

In October 2016, Lacroix was appointed a member of the Congregation for Divine Worship and the Discipline of the Sacraments in addition to his other duties.

On 7 March 2023, Lacroix was appointed to the Council of Cardinal Advisors.

On 25 January 2024, Lacroix was named in a class action lawsuit against the Archdiocese of Quebec, alleging he touched a 17-year-old female in 1987 and 1988, allegations Lacroix has since denied. The unnamed woman has not made any report to the police or to the Church.

On May 21, 2024, the Holy See Press Office confirmed it dismissed the anonymous complaint of abuse versus Lacroix after investigation by André Denis, retired Judge of Superior Court of Quebec. He resumed his duties on July 22, 2024 and further announced he will preside at the Solemn Mass of the feast of Saint Anne in the Basilica of Sainte-Anne-de-Beaupré. He has been considered marginally papabile.

He participated as a cardinal elector in the 2025 papal conclave that elected Pope Leo XIV.

Lacroix is the Grand Prior of the Canada-Québec Lieutenancy of the Equestrian Order of the Holy Sepulchre of Jerusalem.

== See also ==
- Cardinals created by Francis

Catholic Church titles
Preceded by Maurice Bélanger	Director General of the Secular Institute of Pius X 2001 – 7 April 2009	Succeeded by Christian Beaulieu
Preceded by Christophe Zoa	— TITULAR — Titular Bishop of Hilta; 7 April 2009 – 22 February 2011	Succeeded by John Sherrington
Preceded by Marc Ouellet	Archbishop of Quebec; 22 February 2011 –	Incumbent
Preceded by Marc Ouellet	Primate of Canada; 22 February 2011 –	Incumbent
Preceded by Georg Sterzinsky	Cardinal-Priest of San Giuseppe all'Aurelio; 22 February 2014 –	Incumbent
