= Raymond Dumais =

Canadian Roman Catholic bishop (1950-2012)

- Bishop of Gaspé
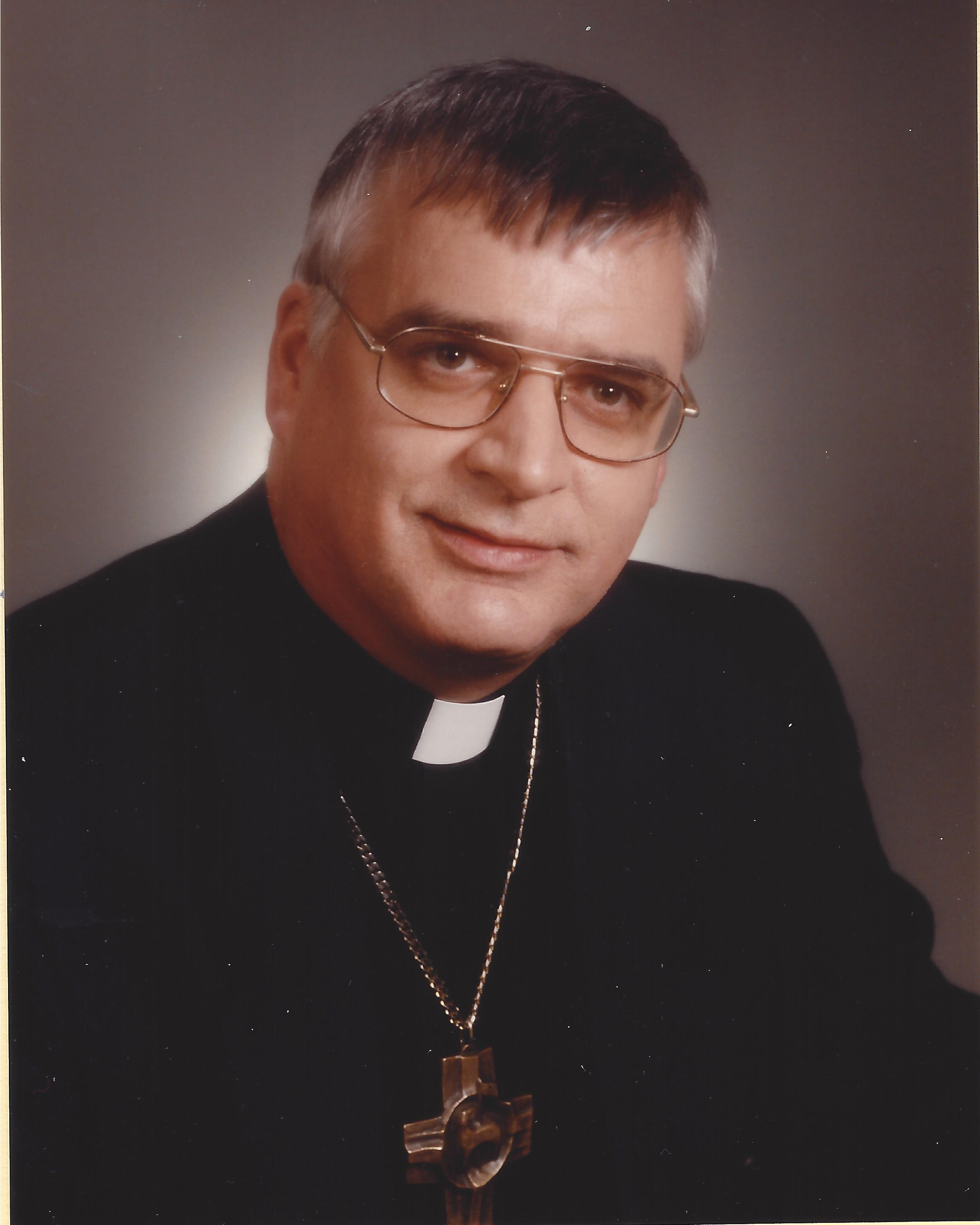
- Church: Catholic Church
- Diocese: Diocese of Gaspé
- In office: 27 December 1993 – 21 July 2001
- Predecessor: Bertrand Blanchet
- Successor: Jean Gagnon

Orders
- Ordination: 26 June 1976 by Joseph Marie Régis Belzile
- Consecration: 20 May 1994 by Bertrand Blanchet

Personal details
- Born: 4 June 1950 Amqui, Quebec, Dominion of Canada, British Empire
- Died: 19 October 2012 (aged 62) Rimouski, Quebec, Canada

Raymond Dumais (4 June 1950 – 19 October 2012) was the Roman Catholic bishop of the Roman Catholic Diocese of Gaspé, Quebec, Canada.

Ordained to the priesthood in 1976, Dumais was named bishop in 1991 and resigned in 2001. He was subsequently married to a woman in a civil ceremony.
