= Clément Fecteau =

Canadian Roman Catholic bishop

Coat of arms of Clément Fecteau.

Joseph Georges Émile Clément Fecteau (20 April 1933 – 31 December 2017) was a Canadian Roman Catholic bishop.

Fecteau was born in Sainte-Marie, Quebec and was ordained to the priesthood in 1957. He subsequently served as an auxiliary bishop of the Roman Catholic Archdiocese of Québec from 1989 to 1996 and the diocesan bishop of the Roman Catholic Diocese of Sainte-Anne-de-la-Pocatière from 1996 until his retirement in 2008. He died on 31 December 2017, aged 84.
