= Jean-Marie Fortier =

Canadian Roman Catholic priest

- Archbishop of Sherbrooke
- Archdiocese: Sherbrooke
- Installed: 1968
- Term ended: 1996
- Predecessor: Georges Cabana
- Successor: André Gaumond
- Other post: Bishop of Gaspé (1965-1968)

Personal details
- Born: July 1, 1920 Quebec City, Quebec
- Died: October 31, 2002 (aged 82)

Jean-Marie Fortier (July 1, 1920 – October 31, 2002) was a Canadian Roman Catholic priest, Bishop of Gaspé, and Archbishop of Sherbrooke.

Born in Quebec City, Quebec, Fortier was ordained a priest in 1944. In 1960, he was appointed Titular Bishop of Pomaria and Auxiliary Bishop of Sainte-Anne-de-la-Pocatière, Québec. In 1965, he was appointed Bishop of Gaspé and was made Archbishop of Sherbrooke in 1968. He retired in 1996 and died in 2002.

== Notes ==
Catholic Church titles
Preceded by Paul Bernier	Bishop of Gaspé; 1965–1968	Succeeded by Joseph Gilles Napoléon Ouellet
