= Saint-Michel Basilica-Cathedral =

Catholic building in Sherbrooke, Quebec, Canada

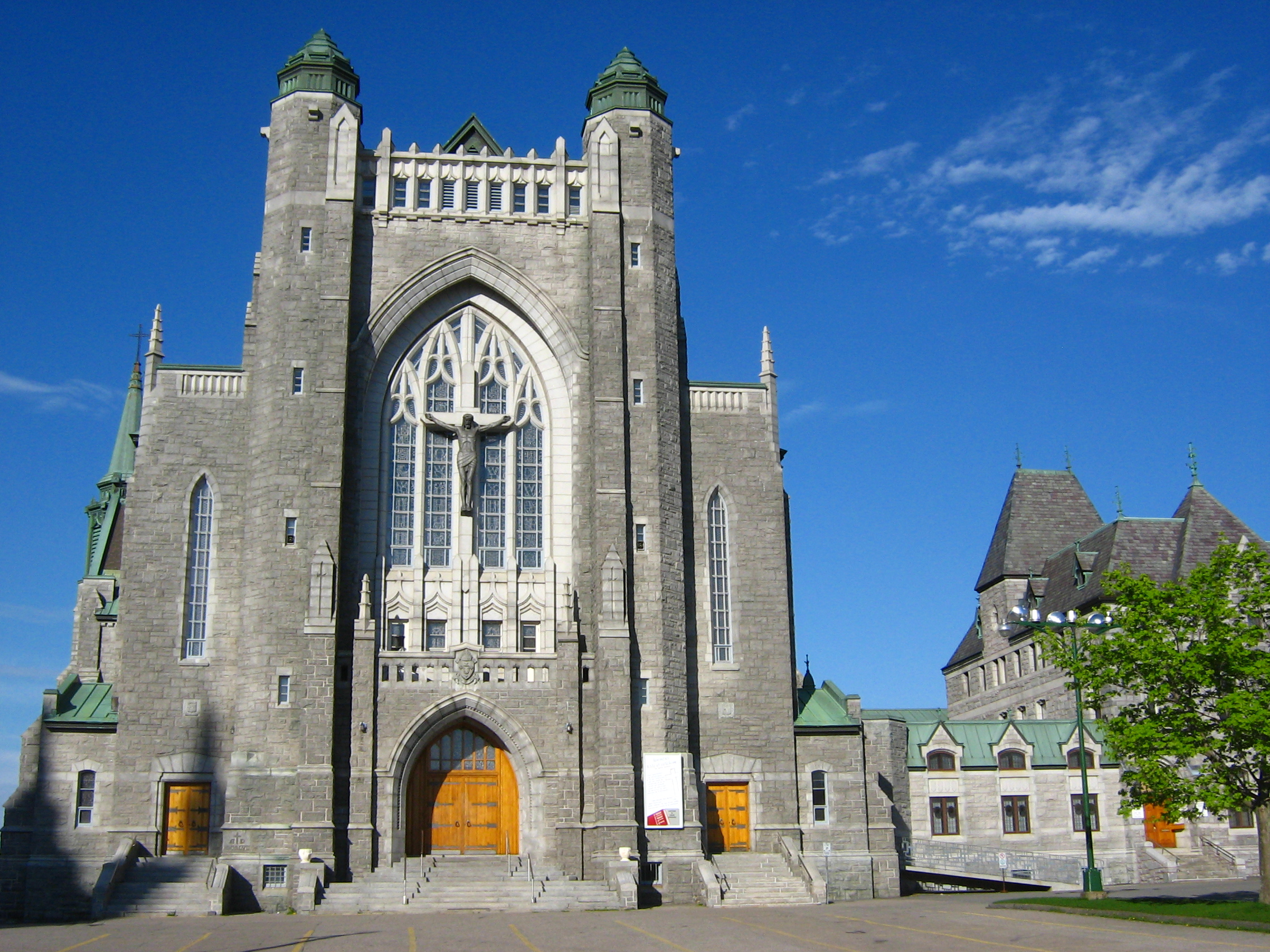

Religion
- Affiliation: Roman Catholic Church
- Province: Roman Catholic Archdiocese of Sherbrooke
- Rite: Roman Rite
- Year consecrated: 1959

Location
- Location: 130, rue de la Cathédrale; Sherbrooke, Quebec; J1H 4L9
- Interactive map of Saint-Michel Basilica-Cathedral
- Coordinates: 45.4025°N 71.8930°W

Architecture
- Completed: 1957

Saint-Michel Basilica-Cathedral (French: Basilique-cathédrale Saint-Michel) is a Roman Catholic minor basilica and cathedral dedicated to St. Michael located in Sherbrooke, Quebec, Canada. The church is the seat of the Roman Catholic Archdiocese of Sherbrooke.

Pope John XXIII raised the shrine to the status of Minor Basilica via his decree Quasi Arx Præsidium on 31 July 1959. The Pontifical decree was signed and notarized by Cardinal Domenico Tardini.

The lower-half of the cathedral was constructed from 1914 to 1917. A lack of funds resulted in a thirty-nine year pause in construction. The completion of the upper-half of the cathedral was in 1956 to 1957.

The cathedral was designed by architect Louis-Napoleon Audet, in Gothic style. Mr Audet was the architect for both phases of construction. The large window of the façade depicts the four Evangelists. The Cathedral of St Michael has 105 stained-glass windows crafted by Rafaël Lardeur of Paris.

The archbishop's chapel was painted by Ozias Leduc.
