= Luc Cyr =

Canadian Catholic prelate (born 1953)

The Most Reverend Luc Cyr
- Archbishop Emeritus of Sherbrooke
- Province: Sherbrooke
- Appointed: July 26, 2011
- Installed: September 29, 2011
- Term ended: September 15, 2025
- Predecessor: André Gaumond
- Previous post: Bishop of Valleyfield

Orders
- Ordination: August 29, 1980 by Charles Valois
- Consecration: June 17, 2001 by Jean-Claude Turcotte

Personal details
- Born: November 21, 1953 (age 72) Saint-Jérôme, Quebec, Canada
- Denomination: Roman Catholic
- Motto: Un Seul Coeur, Une Seule Âme; (One Heart and One Soul)
- Coat of arms

Styles of Luc Cyr
- Reference style: The Most Reverend (English); Monseigneur (French)
- Spoken style: Your Grace (English); Monseigneur (French)
- Religious style: Archbishop

Luc Cyr (born November 21, 1953) is a Canadian prelate of the Roman Catholic Church. He served as the Archbishop of Sherbrooke from 2011 to 2025. He was Bishop of Valleyfield from 2001 to 2011.

== Biography ==
Luc Cyr was born in Saint-Jérôme, Quebec, Canada. He completed his classical studies at the Collège Marie-Victorin and his philosophical studies at the Cogep St-Jérôme. He entered the Major Seminary of Montreal in 1976 and earned his bachelor's degree in theology from the University of Montreal in 1984. He was ordained a priest for the Diocese of Saint-Jérôme on August 29, 1980, by Bishop Charles Valois.

He was Vicar Cooperator of the Cathedral in 1980/1981 and then vicar of St. Louis de France in Terrebonne from 1981 to 1984. In 1984, he studied spirituality for a year at the Focolare Movement in Florence. He obtained a licentiate in moral theology from the Alphonsian Academy in Rome in 1987. Returning to Canada, he was pastor of Assumption parish in Blainville from 1987 to 1992. He headed the Vocations and Formation Service of the diocese from 1992 to 1994, and from 1994 to 2001 was vicar general. He was also a member of the priests council and the pastoral council, and a diocesan consultor as well.

Pope John Paul II appointed him Bishop of Valleyfield on May 10, 2001. He received his episcopal consecration on June 17, 2001, from Cardinal Jean-Claude Turcotte, Archbishop of Montréal.

Pope Benedict XVI named him Archbishop of Sherbrooke on July 26, 2011, and Cyr was installed there on September 29. He was chancellor ex officio of the University of Sherbrooke.

In 2018, he represented the Canadian Conference of Catholic Bishops at the general assembly of the Latin American and Caribbean Episcopal Council (CELAM) in Medellín, Colombia. In October of that year he represented the bishops of French Canada at the Synod of Bishops on Youth and Vocational Discernment.

In March 2024 he ceased working for a time on the advice of his doctors, and he decided to retire when his doctors recommended another withdrawal from work in 2025. Pope Leo XIV accepted his resignation on September 15, 2025.
