= André-Albert Blais =

Canadian Catholic prelate

- Bishop of Rimouski
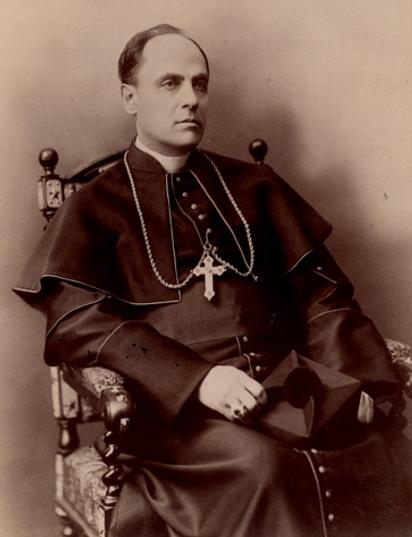
- Archdiocese: Rimouski
- Installed: 1891
- Term ended: 1919
- Predecessor: Jean Langevin
- Successor: Joseph-Romuald Léonard

Personal details
- Born: 26 August 1842 Saint-Vallier, Quebec
- Died: 23 January 1919 (aged 76)

André-Albert Blais (26 August 1842 – 23 January 1919) was a Canadian Roman Catholic priest and Bishop of Rimouski.

Born in Saint-Vallier, Quebec, the son of Hubert Blais and Marguerite Roy, Blais was educated in Sainte-Anne-de-la-Pocatière, Quebec, at the Quebec Seminary and at Collège de Lévis. He was ordained in 1868. From 1868 to 1869, he taught at Collège de Lévis. From 1869 to 1873, he was a professor of English at the Quebec Seminary and assistant director of the Pensionnat. From 1873 to 1874, he was director of the Pensionnat. From 1874 to 1877, he studied in Rome. From 1877 to 1881, he was a professor of Canonical law at the Quebec Seminary. From 1882 to 1889, he was a chaplain in Bon Pasteur, Quebec. In 1889, he was appointed Titular Bishop of Germanicopolis. In 1891, he was appointed Bishop of Rimouski.

The Municipality of Saint-André-de-Restigouche was named after him.
