= Jean Langevin =

- Bishop of Rimouski
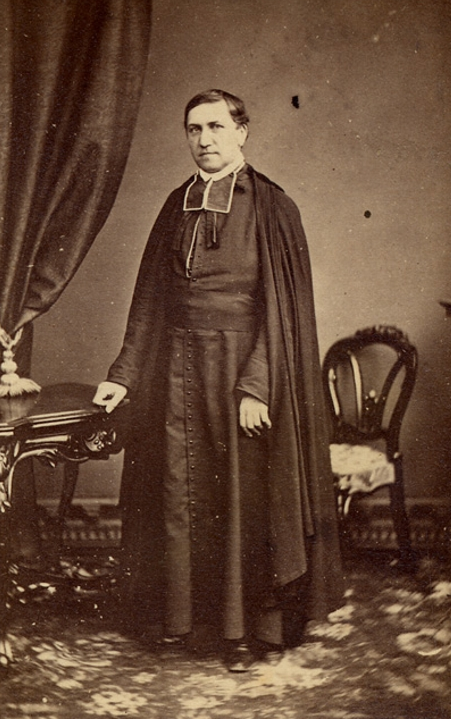
- Archdiocese: Rimouski
- Installed: 1867
- Term ended: 1891
- Successor: André-Albert Blais

Personal details
- Born: Jean-Pierre-François-Laforce Langevin; 22 September 1821 Quebec City, Lower Canada
- Died: 26 January 1892 (aged 70) Rimouski, Quebec

Jean-Pierre-François-Laforce Langevin (22 September 1821 – 26 January 1892) was born and lived his life in Quebec. He was taught by a governess before entering the Petit Séminaire de Quebec. He began his studies for the priesthood at the Grand Séminaire and taught back at his old school, a vocation he continued after he was ordained priest. His teaching and parish experience covered a number of years and were rewarding and successful. His final position in education was principal of the École Normale Laval.

In 1867, he was appointed as the first Roman Catholic bishop of the diocese of Rimouski. He served there for 24 years in an administration that was often stormy and difficult. His last three years were marred by poor physical and mental health. He resigned his duties in 1891 at the request of Cardinal Taschereau on behalf of papal authorities.

His brother, Hector-Louis Langevin, was one of the Fathers of Confederation.
