= Punxsutawney Phil =

Groundhog in Pennsylvania, United States

Coordinates: 40.9302°N 78.9578°W

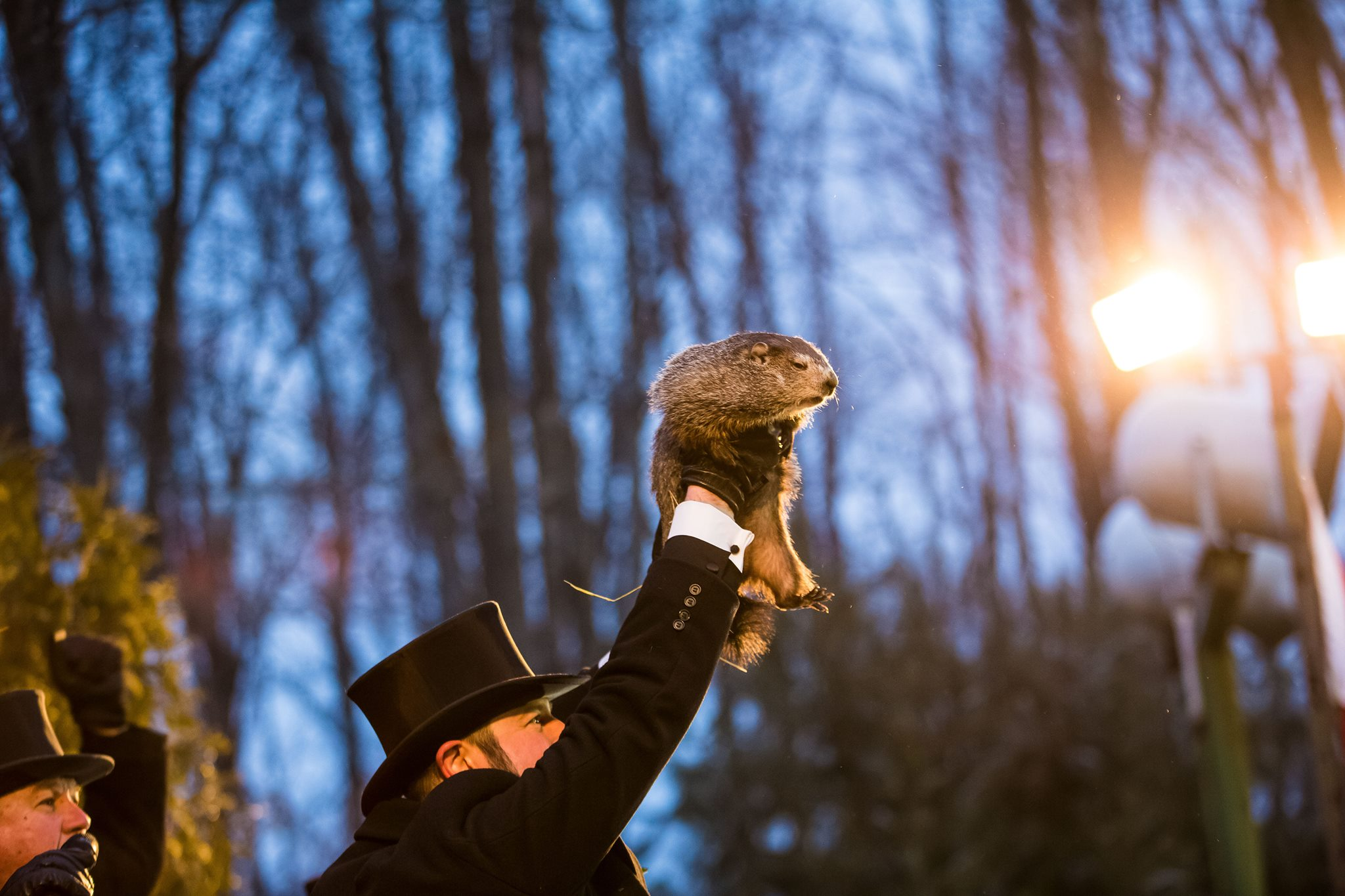
- Phil in February 2018
- Other name: Phil
- Species: Groundhog
- Sex: Male

Punxsutawney Phil (/ˌpʌŋksəˈtɔːni/) is a groundhog residing in Young Township near Punxsutawney, Pennsylvania, United States, who is the central figure in Punxsutawney's annual Groundhog Day celebration.

== Overview ==
The Punxsutawney Groundhog Day celebration is rooted in Germanic tradition that says that if a hibernating animal casts a shadow on February 2, the Christian celebration of Candlemas, winter and cold weather will last another six weeks. If no shadow is seen, legend says, spring will come early. In Germany, the tradition evolved into a myth that if the sun came out on Candlemas, a hedgehog would cast its shadow, predicting snow all the way into May. When German immigrants settled in Pennsylvania, they transferred the tradition onto local fauna, replacing hedgehogs with groundhogs. Several towns in the region on either side of the US-Canada border hold similar Groundhog Day events, though Punxsutawney's event is the most famous.

Punxsutawney's annual civic festival is held on February 2 each year. The central event is a ceremony, which begins well before the winter sunrise, where Phil emerges from his temporary home on Gobbler's Knob, located in a rural area about 2 miles (3 km) southeast of the town. According to the tradition, if Phil sees his shadow and returns to his hole, he has predicted six more weeks of winter-like weather. If Phil does not see his shadow, he has predicted an "early spring." The event formally began in 1887, although its roots go back even further. The event, and other groundhog-related events throughout the year, are organized by the Punxsutawney Groundhog Club's "Inner Circle" – recognizable by their top hats and tuxedos.

The event is based upon a communal light-hearted suspension of disbelief which ascribes fantastical abilities to Phil. Ostensibly, Phil communicates his prediction to the president of the Inner Circle, who can magically understand his "Groundhogese" due to possession of an ancient acacia wood cane. The president then directs the vice president to read the a corresponding scroll (one is prepared for each potential outcome), announcing Phil's forecast.

The suspension of disbelief extends to the assertion that Phil is infallible, and occasional incorrect predictions are the errors of those in charge of translating the message rather than Phil himself. Empirical estimates place the predictions' accuracy between 35% and 41%. Additionally, it is asserted that Phil is the same groundhog who has been making predictions since the 19th century, sustained by drinks of "groundhog punch" or "elixir of life" administered at the annual Groundhog Picnic in the fall.

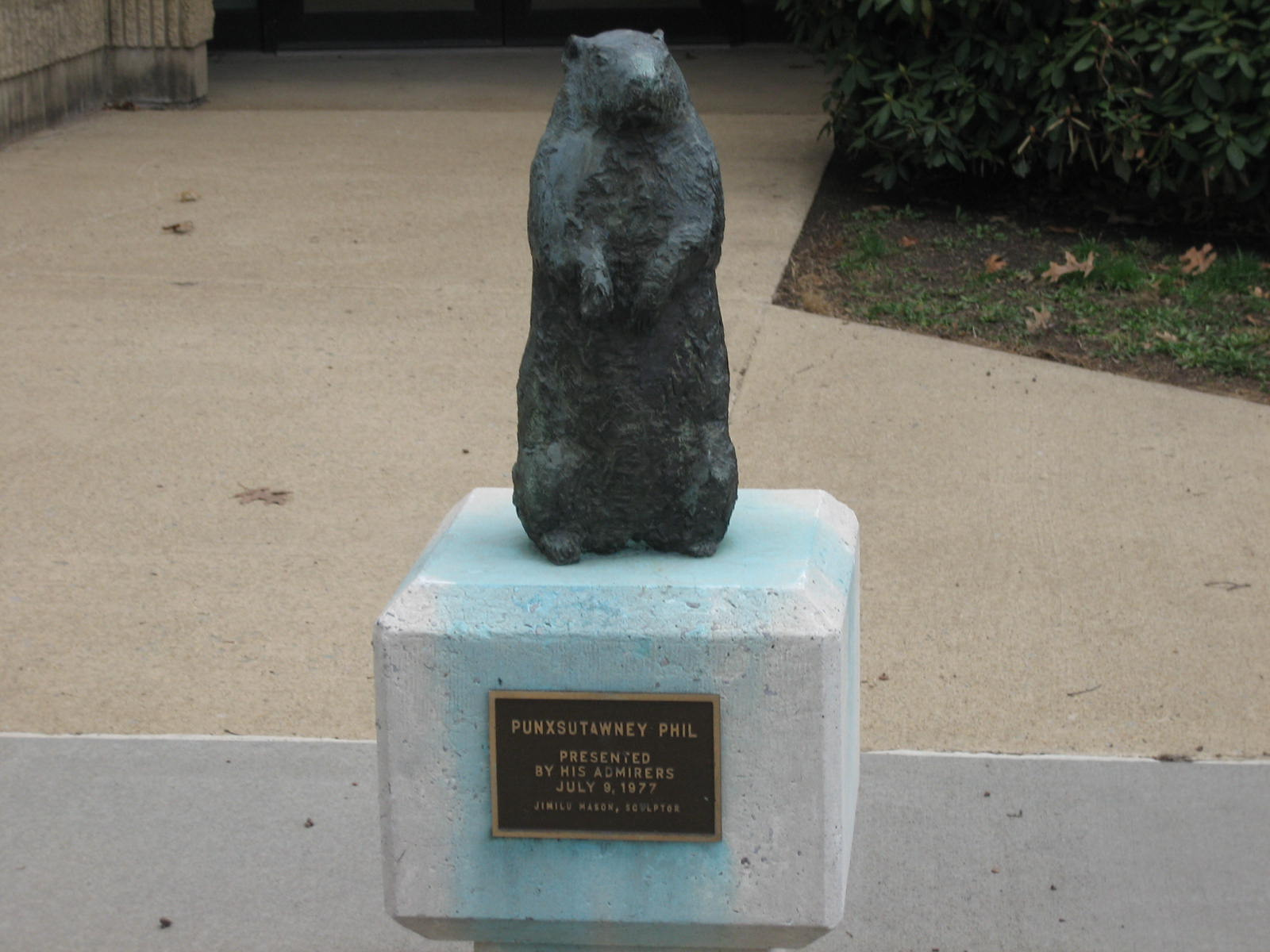
Phil's official statue, April 2006

Outside of Groundhog Day, Phil resided with a mate, Phyllis, at the Punxsutawney Memorial Library in a climate-controlled environment. In March 2024, the Inner Circle announced that Phil had sired two babies, the first time in the history of the event that such a siring had happened; the birth surprised the Inner Circle, which had assumed that groundhogs do not breed in captivity. As a result of the births, the Groundhog club was working to build a larger environment for the family at Gobbler's Knob.

Phil first received his name in 1961. The origins of the name are unclear, but speculation suggests that it may have been indirectly named after Prince Philip, Duke of Edinburgh.

== Reception ==
The event in Punxsutawney attracted crowds of approximately 2,000 prior to 1993. However, the popularity of the film Groundhog Day brought significantly more attention to the event, with annual crowds rising to 10,000–20,000. The event has been streamed online each year since 2018. The ceremony in 2021 took place without any crowds, due to COVID-19 pandemic restrictions.

Three governors of Pennsylvania have attended the festivities while in office: Ed Rendell in 2003, Tom Corbett in 2012, and Josh Shapiro in 2023, 2024 and 2025. Shapiro named Phil state meteorologist during the 2024 ceremony.

In some cases where Phil's prognostications have been incorrect, organizations have jokingly made legal threats against the groundhog. Such tongue-in-cheek actions have been made by a prosecutor in Ohio, the Monroe County, Pennsylvania sheriff's office, and the Merrimack, New Hampshire Police Department. People for the Ethical Treatment of Animals object to the event, claiming that Phil is put under stress. They suggest replacing Phil with a robotic groundhog.

== In media and popular culture ==
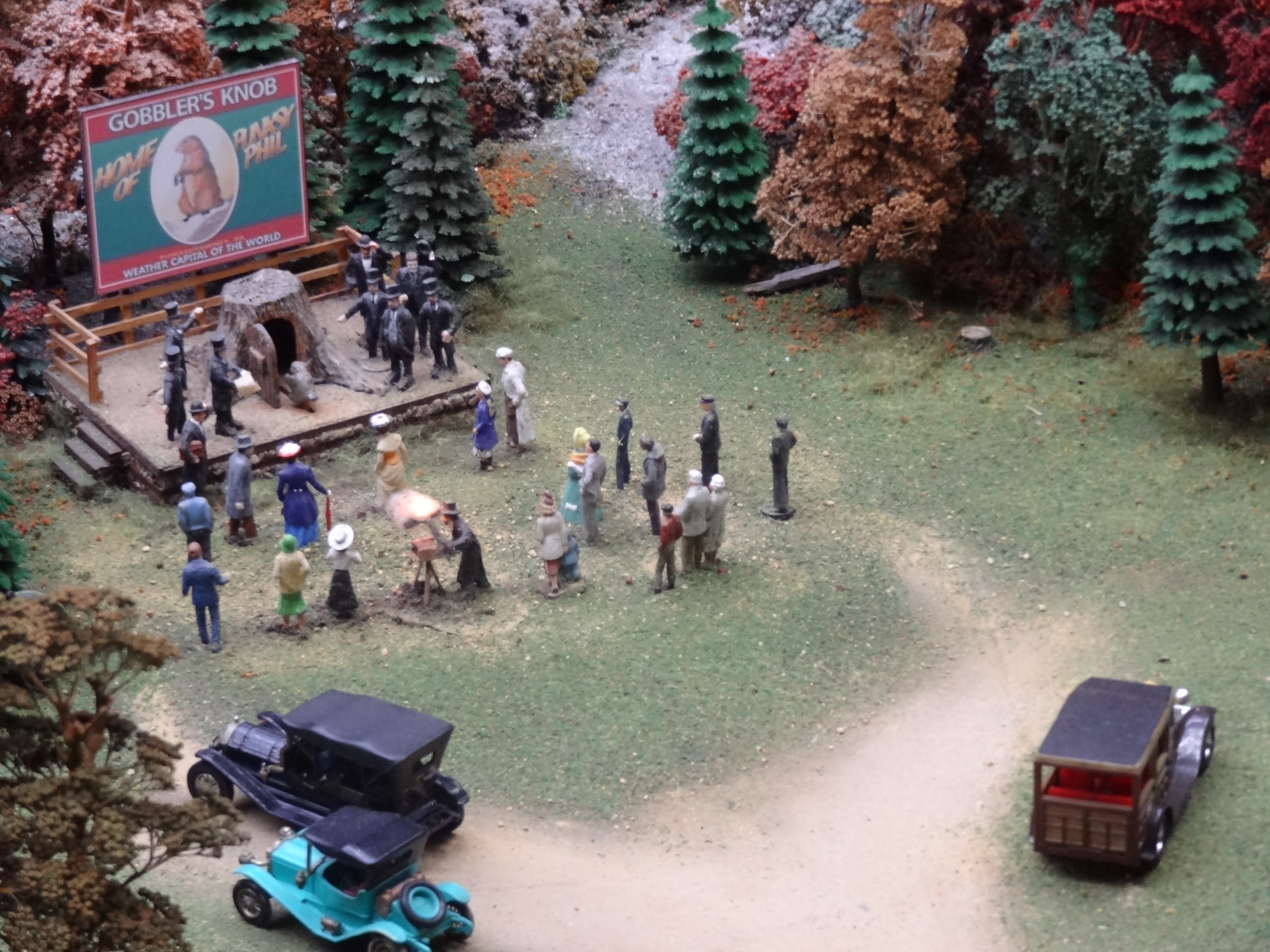
Miniature replica at MRRV, Carnegie Science Center, Pittsburgh

- Phil and the town of Punxsutawney were portrayed in the 1993 film Groundhog Day. However, the movie was actually filmed in Woodstock, Illinois.
  - In Groundhog Day, the 2016 Broadway musical adaptation of the film, Phil is ascribed a more mythical role.
- In 1995, Phil was flown to Chicago for a guest appearance on The Oprah Winfrey Show, which aired on Groundhog Day, February 2, 1995.
- A 2002 episode of the children's animated series Stanley, titled "Searching for Spring", featured Punxsutawney Phil.
- Phil was the main attraction in "Groundhog Day", the April 10, 2005, episode of the MTV series Viva La Bam. In the episode, street skater Bam Margera holds a downhill race in honor of Punxsutawney Phil at Bear Creek Mountain Resort in Macungie, Pennsylvania.
- The Pennsylvania Lottery's mascot is a groundhog named Gus, referred to in commercials as "the second most famous groundhog in Pennsylvania", in deference to Phil. Since the Groundhog Club Inner Circle has trademarked the use of the name "Punxsutawney Phil," no commercial entity may use the name without permission.
- Phil is the protagonist of the 2024 play How to Kill a Rodent. In the play, Canadians Guy and Carrie go to Punxsutawney to commit an act of terrorism against the United States by assassinating Phil on live television.

== Historical predictions ==
Punxsutawney Phil's predictions
						1886	1887	1888	1889
1890	1891	1892	1893	1894	1895	1896	1897	1898	1899
1900	1901	1902	1903	1904	1905	1906	1907	1908	1909
1910	1911	1912	1913	1914	1915	1916	1917	1918	1919
1920	1921	1922	1923	1924	1925	1926	1927	1928	1929
1930	1931	1932	1933	1934	1935	1936	1937	1938	1939
1940	1941	1942	1943	1944	1945	1946	1947	1948	1949
1950	1951	1952	1953	1954	1955	1956	1957	1958	1959
1960	1961	1962	1963	1964	1965	1966	1967	1968	1969
1970	1971	1972	1973	1974	1975	1976	1977	1978	1979
1980	1981	1982	1983	1984	1985	1986	1987	1988	1989
1990	1991	1992	1993	1994	1995	1996	1997	1998	1999
2000	2001	2002	2003	2004	2005	2006	2007	2008	2009
2010	2011	2012	2013	2014	2015	2016	2017	2018	2019
2020	2021	2022	2023	2024	2025	2026			

Six more weeks of winter (109)
Early spring (20)
"War clouds have blacked out parts of the shadow." (1)
No appearance (event canceled) (1)
No record (10)

== See also ==
- Balzac Billy, the official groundhog of Balzac, Alberta, Canada
- Buckeye Chuck, the official groundhog of Marion, Ohio, United States
- Fred la Marmotte, the official groundhog of Val-d'Espoir, Quebec, Canada
- General Beauregard Lee, the official groundhog of Jackson, Georgia, United States (and by extension, the entire Southern US)
- Gus the Groundhog, mascot of the Pennsylvania Lottery
- Shubenacadie Sam, the official groundhog of Shubenacadie, Nova Scotia, Canada
- Staten Island Chuck, the official groundhog of New York City, New York, United States
- Stormy Marmot, a yellow-bellied marmot who is part of the Groundhog Day celebrations of Aurora, Colorado, United States
- Wiarton Willie, the official groundhog of Wiarton, Ontario, Canada
