= Buckeye Chuck =

Weather-predicting groundhog in Cleveland, Ohio, US

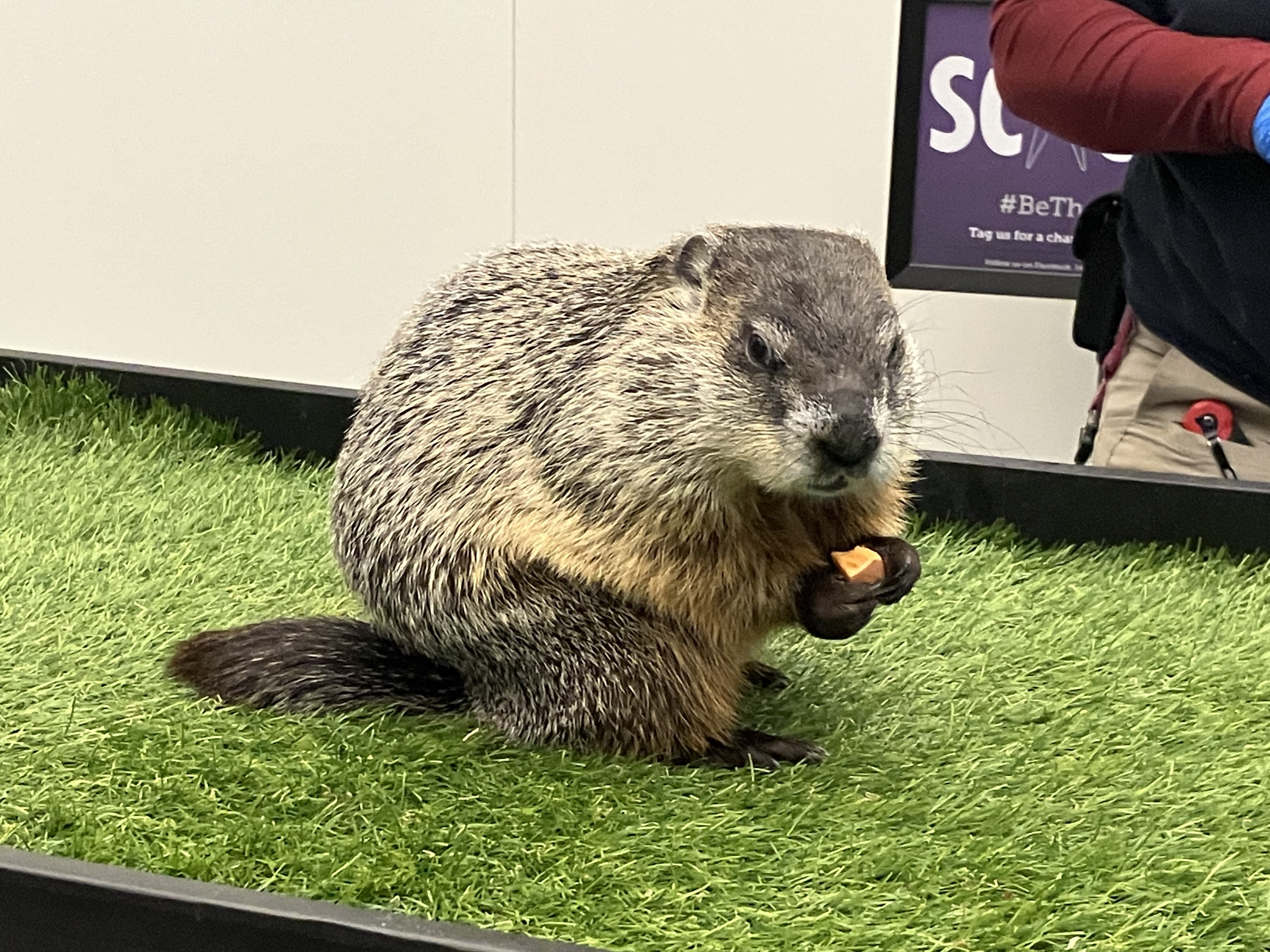
Murray, a groundhog on residence at the Cleveland Museum of Natural History who currently serves as Buckeye Chuck.

Buckeye Chuck is a groundhog at the Cleveland Museum of Natural History in Cleveland who predicts arrival of spring on Groundhog Day at an event in Marion, Ohio. He is one of two groundhogs in Ohio known for predicting the arrival of spring. Chuck began predicting the arrival of spring in the 1970s. and the Ohio General Assembly declared Buckeye Chuck the official State Groundhog in 1979. He previously resided in Marion until June 2023 until being relocated, though the Groundhog Day forecast and event are still held in Marion, with Buckeye Chuck brought in from Cleveland. From 2006 to 2015, Chuck's forecast was correct only twice.

According to the legend of Groundhog Day, the groundhog's behavior is a way of forecasting the weather. If the groundhog pops out from its burrow, sees his shadow, and then disappears again, it will mean that winter is to continue for six more weeks. But if the groundhog does not see its shadow, then it will not be scared to come out of its burrow and winter will soon end.

== Past predictions ==
Year	Prediction
2026	Early spring
2025	Early spring
2024	Early spring
2023	6 more weeks of winter
2022	Early spring
2021	Early spring
2020	Early spring
2019	Early spring
2018	6 more weeks of winter
2017	6 more weeks of winter
2016	6 more weeks of winter
2015	Early spring
2014	Early spring
2013	Early spring
2012	Early spring
2011	Early spring
2010	Early spring
2009	6 more weeks of winter
2008	Early spring
2007	Early spring
2006	6 more weeks of winter

== See also ==
- Balzac Billy
- Fred la marmotte
- General Beauregard Lee
- Punxsutawney Phil
- Shubenacadie Sam
- Staten Island Chuck
- Stormy Marmot
- Wiarton Willie
