= Balzac (disambiguation) =

Honoré de Balzac (1799–1850) was a French novelist and playwright.

Balzac may also refer to:

== Astronomy ==
- Balzac (crater), a crater on Mercury
- 18430 Balzac, an asteroid

== Places ==
- Balzac, Alberta, Canada
- Balzac, Charente, France

== Music ==
- Balzac (band), a Japanese punk band

== People ==
=== People with the surname ===
- Jean-Louis Guez de Balzac (1597–1654), French author
- Catherine Henriette de Balzac d'Entragues (1579–1633), mistress to Henry IV of France
- Jesús M. Balzac, plaintiff in Balzac v. Porto Rico

=== Other people ===
- Federico Balzaretti, also known as Balzac, Italian footballer

== Other uses ==
- Le Balzac, a cinema in Paris

== See also ==
- Balsac (disambiguation)
- Balzac Billy, Groundhog Day prognosticator
- Balzac blanc, French wine grape variety
  - Mourvèdre, or Balzac noir, another grape variety
- Dassault Balzac V, a jet fighter prototype of the 1960s
