= Sable Island horse =

Canadian breed of horse

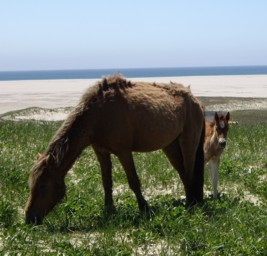
- Feral Sable Island horses
- Country of origin: Canada

Traits
- Distinguishing features: Small, stocky feral horses

The Sable Island horse is a small feral horse found on Sable Island, off the coast of Nova Scotia, Canada. It is usually dark in colour. The first horses were released on the island in the late 1700s, and soon became feral. Additional horses were later transported to improve the herd's breeding stock. They were rounded up for private use and sale for slaughter, which by the 1950s had placed them in danger of extinction. During the 2018 study, the estimated population was 500 horses, up from the roughly 300 recorded in the 1970s.

In 1960, the Canadian government protected the horses by law in their feral state. From the 1980s on, long-term, noninvasive herd studies have been performed, and in 2007 a genetic analysis was conducted that concluded the herd was genetically distinct enough to interest conservationists. In 2008, the horses were declared the official horse of Nova Scotia, and in 2011, the island was declared the Sable Island National Park Reserve. The herd is unmanaged, and legally protected from interference by humans. The horses live only at Sable Island and, until 2019, at the Shubenacadie Wildlife Park on the mainland of Nova Scotia, with the latter herd descended from horses removed from Sable Island in the 1950s.

== Characteristics ==
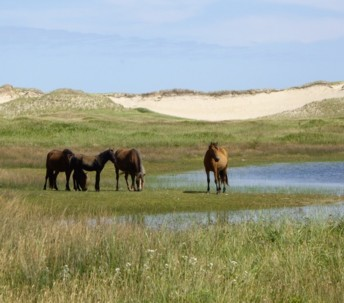
Typical colour patterns

The horses that remain on Sable Island are feral. They generally stand between 13 and 14 hands (52 and 56 inches, 132 and 142 cm). Males from the island average about 360 kilograms (790 lb) and females about 300 kilograms (660 lb). The available food on the island limits their size, and the offspring of horses removed from the island and fed more nutritious diets are generally larger. Physically, the horses resemble Iberian horses, with arched necks and sloping croups. Overall, they are stocky and short, with short pasterns that allow them to move easily on sandy or rough ground. Sable Island horses have very shaggy coats, manes and tails, especially during the winter. The tail is full and low-set. Their coats are mostly dark colours, but some do have white markings. About half are bays, with the rest distributed among chestnut, flaxen, and black. Many Sable Island horses have a natural ambling gait. Prior to their protection, when they could be kept for the use of humans, the horses were known for their sure-footedness and gaits.

The Sable Island horses are a feral horse population that is entirely unmanaged: they are not subject to any kind of interference. Observational research, which is considered noninvasive to the herd, has been conducted by various entities over several decades. The population in recent years (2009 and onward) has varied between 400 and 550 animals. Due to the lack of predators, older horses often die of starvation after their teeth are worn down by a lifetime of exposure to sand and marram.

== History ==
Sable Island is a narrow, crescent-shaped island located approximately 300 kilometres (190 mi) southeast of Nova Scotia. It is 42 kilometres (26 mi) long and covered in sand dunes and grasses. Over 350 bird species and 190 plant species have been found on the island, in addition to the herd of feral horses, which are the most well-known inhabitants.

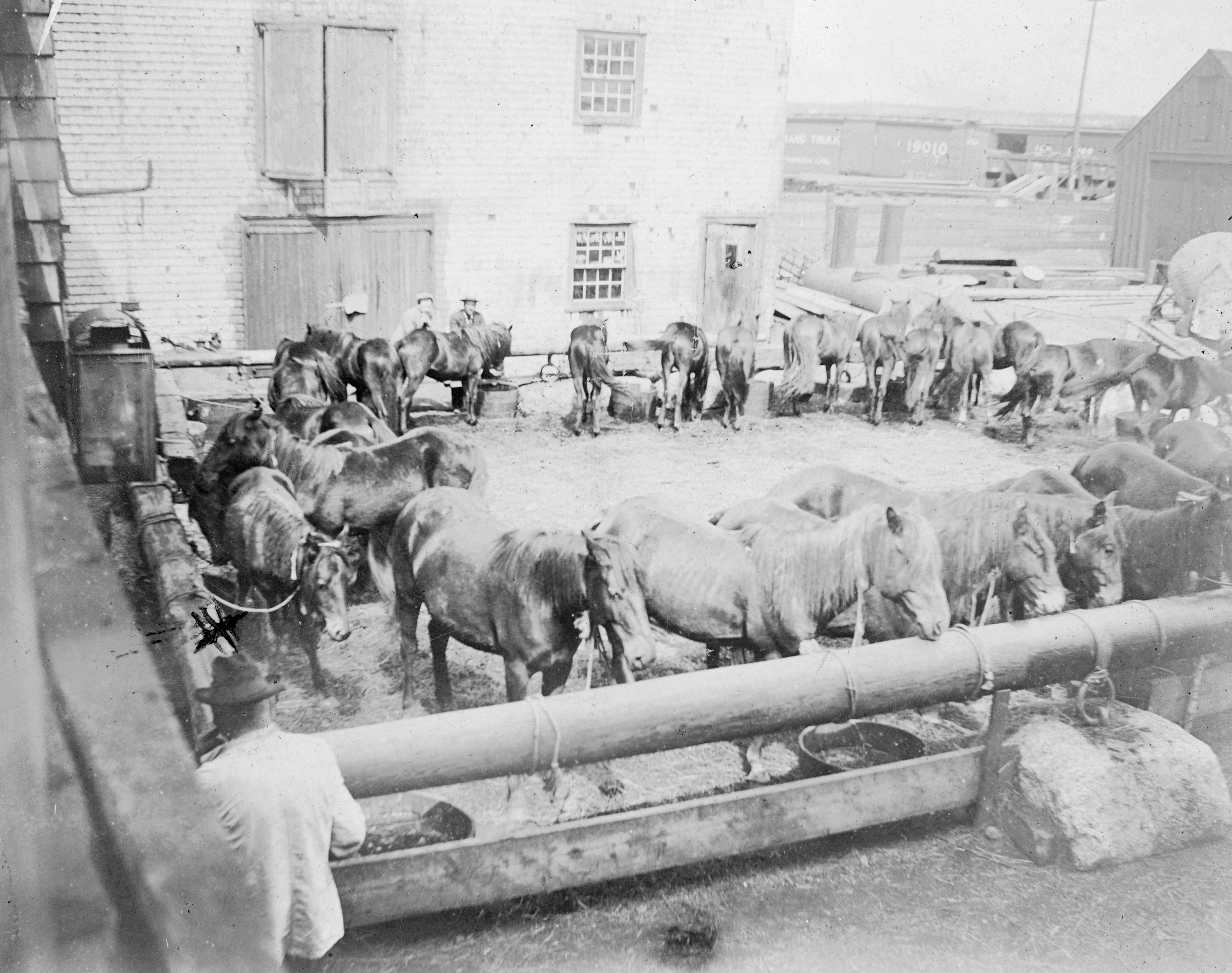
Ponies in Halifax, Nova Scotia for auction in 1902, after having been removed from the island

Although popular legends claim that Sable Island horses swam ashore from the island's many shipwrecks, or were introduced by 16th-century Portuguese explorers, this is not supported by historical or genetic evidence. In reality, the horses were deliberately introduced to the island during the 18th century. The first recorded horses were brought by a Boston clergyman, the Reverend Andrew Le Mercier, in 1737 but most were stolen by passing mariners. The present-day horses are thought by most historians and scientists to have descended mostly from horses seized by the British from the Acadians during their expulsion by the British. The Acadian horses were descendants of several shipments of French horses, including members of the Breton, Andalusian and Norman breeds, later crossed with horses from New England, including Spanish Barbs. The Boston merchant and shipowner Thomas Hancock purchased some Acadian horses and transported them to Sable Island in 1760, where they grazed the island as pasture. Although often referred to as ponies due to their small size, they have a horse phenotype and an ancestry composed solely of horses.

After the government of Nova Scotia established a lifesaving station on Sable Island in 1801, workers trained some of the horses to haul supplies and rescue equipment. Lifesaving staff recorded the importation of a stallion, Jolly, taken there in 1801, who was probably similar in type to the original Acadian horses released on the island. Although Jolly was not the first horse on the island, he was the first to be identified by name in historic records, and is known to have survived on the island until at least 1812. Other breeding stock, probably including horses of Thoroughbred, Morgan and Clydesdale breeding, were sent to the island during the first half of the 19th century, in the hopes of improving the type of horses found on the island and raising the price for which they could be sold on the mainland.

During the 19th and early 20th centuries, the horses on Sable Island were periodically rounded up and either kept by islanders or transported to the mainland, where they were sold, frequently for slaughter. The meat was primarily used for dog food by the late 1950s, and the island horses were in danger of extinction. School children began a public campaign to save the horses. In 1960, as part of the Canadian Shipping Act, the Canadian government declared the horses fully protected and no longer able to be rounded up and sold. The law requires that people receive written permission before they can "molest, interfere with, feed or otherwise have anything to do with the ponies on the Island".

=== Study and preservation ===
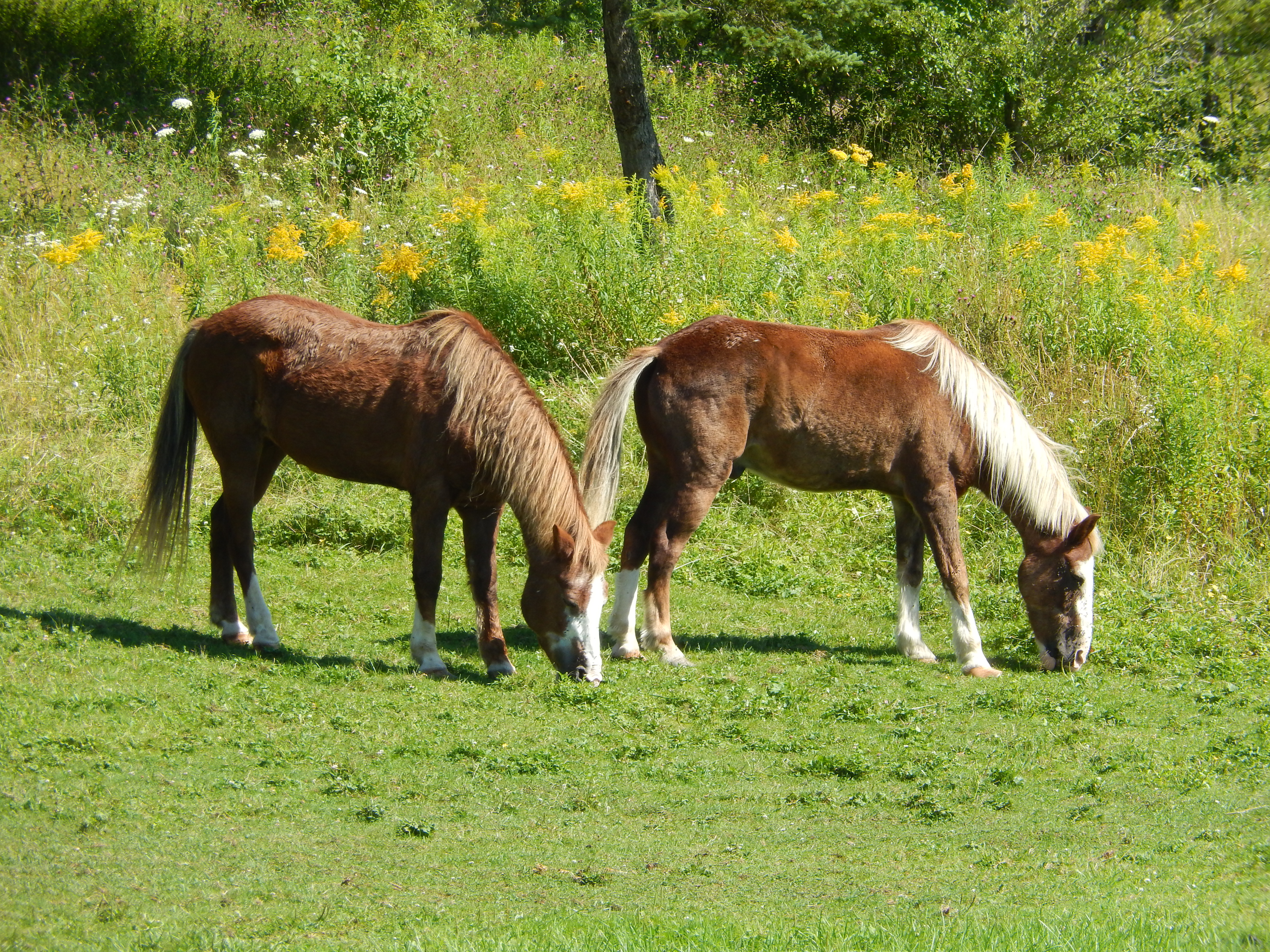
Sable Island Horses at the Shubenacadie Wildlife Park

Beginning in the mid-1980s, long term studies were begun of the Sable Island herds, and by the mid-2000s, most horses living on the island had documented histories. In 2007, a genetic analysis of the Sable Island herd was performed. It was concluded that these horses were genetically similar to multipurpose and light draft breeds found in eastern mainland Canada, with differences probably created by natural selection and genetic drift. However, the researchers also stated that Sable Island horses had genetically "diverged enough from other breeds to deserve special attention by conservation interest groups", and that the loss of the Sable Island horses would be more damaging to the genetic diversity of the Canadian horse population than the loss of any other breed. Genetic erosion is a possibility within the Sable Island population, due to the small number of horses. In a study of mitochondrial DNA published in 2012, the Sable Island horse was found to be the least genetically diverse of the 24 horse populations studied, which included horse and pony breeds as well as feral populations from North America and Europe. A 2014 study by Parks Canada stated that the horses were under threat from their low numbers, excessive inbreeding and extreme weather due to global warming.

In 2008, the Nova Scotia Legislature declared the Sable Island Horse as one of the official provincial symbols, making them the official horse of Nova Scotia. In 2011, the Canadian government created the Sable Island National Park Reserve, which allows further protection of the island and horses. Aside from the island, until 2019, Sable Island Horses lived only at the Shubenacadie Wildlife Park in Shubenacadie, Nova Scotia. It maintained descendants of Sable Island Ponies removed from the island in the 1950s by the Canadian Department of Transport. The last remaining horse was euthanized in September 2019. Nonetheless, some continue to view the horses as an invasive species which is not suitable in a protected region where ecological integrity should be preserved according to the National Parks Act.

A study published in 2019 found that the Sable Island horses had about three times the level of parasite eggs in their fecal material than domesticated horses, averaging 1500 eggs per gram. These included a parasitic lungworm that caused respiratory diseases; the horses also suffered from reproductive diseases. Necropsies of carcasses inspected in 2017 and 2018 showed that young horses died of starvation and hypothermia, particularly during extreme winters, as they would not have a sufficient reserve of body fat and suitable vegetation is sparse on the island during winter. Adults died of other causes. These results confirmed a similar study from 1972. The study also found that these horses incidentally consume significant quantities of sand, which gradually wears down their teeth and blocks their gastrointestinal tract.

Typical mortality rates are about 1% annually; during a harsh 2017 spring, the mortality rate was 10%.

== See also ==
- Banker horse
- Carolina Marsh Tacky
- Chincoteague pony
- Cumberland Island horse
- Landrace
- Island dwarfism
- Pit Pony, a novel about a Sable Island horse
