= Shubenacadie station =

Railway station in Nova Scotia, Canada

General information
- Location: Shubenacadie, Nova Scotia, Canada
- Coordinates: 45.0883°N 63.4059°W

History
- Closed: 1990
Location

Shubenacadie station was a railway station in Shubenacadie, Nova Scotia, Canada. It was served by the Nova Scotia Railway, Intercolonial Railway, Canadian National Railways (CN) and later Via Rail. In the 1970s and 1980s, it was served by Budd Rail Diesel Car passenger trains operated by CN and later Via until the end of RDC service in Nova Scotia in 1990. The station has been demolished.
