= Balsac =

Balsac may refer to:

- Balsac the Jaws of Death (born 1968), character and guitarist in the rock band Gwar
- Balsac, Aveyron, France
- BALSAC (database), a Quebec population database
- Henri Heim de Balsac (1899–1979), French zoologist

== See also ==
- Balzac (disambiguation)
