= Andrew Le Mercier =

Huguenot leader (1692–1764)

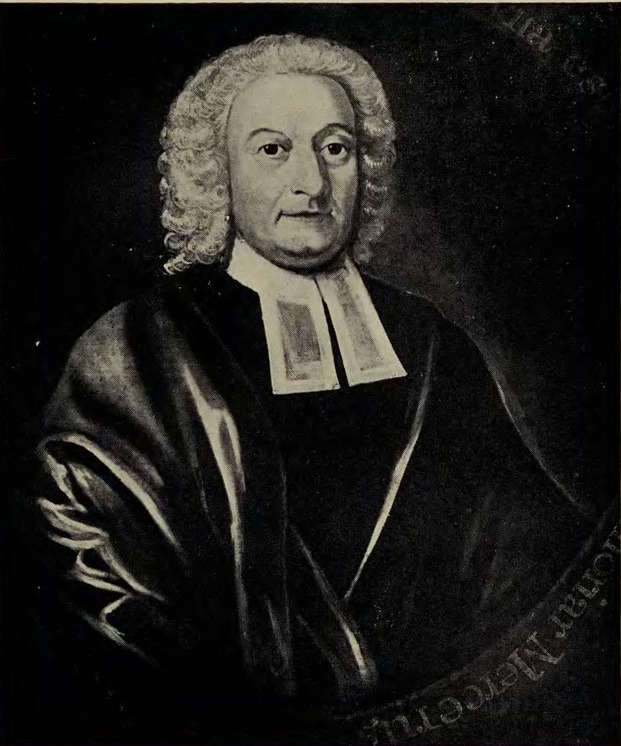
- portrait by John Greenwood
- Born: 1692; Caen
- Died: 1 April 1764 (aged 71–72)
- Alma mater: University of Geneva
- Occupation: Pastor

Andrew Le Mercier (1692–1764) was a French-born Protestant Huguenot leader in Boston in the 18th century and author.

Le Mercier was born in Normandy, France in 1692, completing clerical studies in Geneva at the then Geneva Academy in 1715 and arrived in Boston (then in the English colony of Province of Massachusetts Bay) in 1716 recruited by André Faneuil as pastor of the Boston French Church (now 24 School Street) and remained there until 1741 when the church closed.

Le Mercier was a respected leader amongst the small Huguenot community that existed in New England for almost three decades.

== Personal ==
His son Andrew Le Mercier Jr would serve in the British colonial forces during the French and Indian War.

== Shipwreck Relief ==
Sometime in 1737-1738 he built a house for the relief of shipwrecked mariners on Sable Island. There is belief that the Sable Island horses were introduced by him.

== Later years and death ==
Le Mercier retired after the closure of the Boston church to a farm in Roxbury, Massachusetts, and died there in 1764.

== Books ==
Le Mercier is credited to two books:

- "The Church History of Geneva, in Five Books, with a Political and Geographical Account of that Republic" (Boston, 1732)
- "Treatise against Detraction" (1733)
