= Groundhog Day =

Tradition observed in the US and Canada

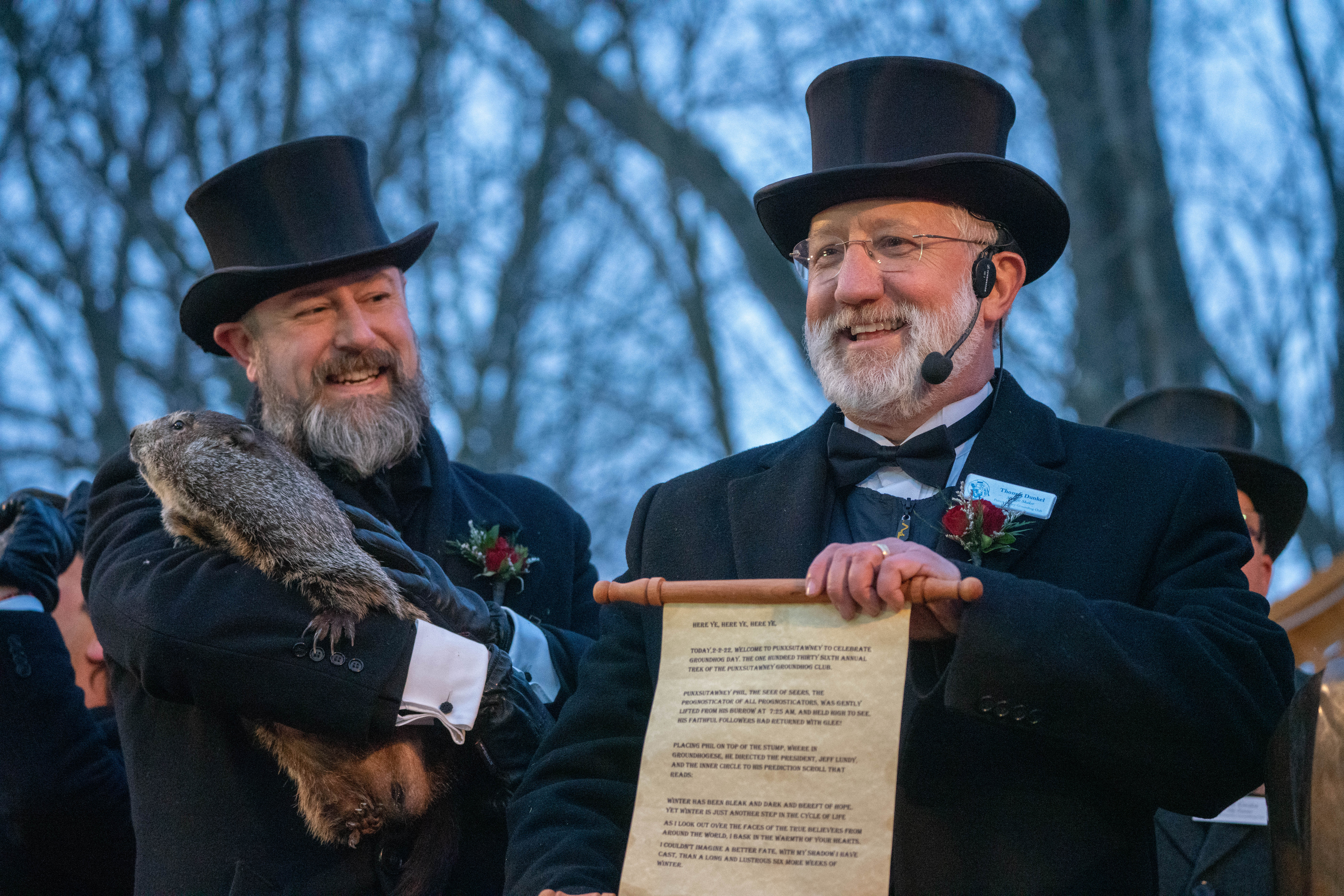
- 2022 celebration in Punxsutawney, Pennsylvania, US
- Observed by: United States; Canada
- Type: Cultural
- Significance: Predicts the arrival of spring
- Celebrations: Announcing whether a groundhog sees its shadow after it emerges from its burrow
- Date: February 2
- Frequency: Annual
- Related to: Candlemas

Groundhog Day (Pennsylvania German: Grund'sau dåk, Grundsaudaag, Grundsow Dawg, Murmeltiertag; Canadian French: Journée de la marmotte; Lunenburg, Nova Scotia: Daks Day) is a tradition observed regionally in the United States and Canada on February 2 of every year. It derives from the Pennsylvania Dutch superstition that if a groundhog emerges from its burrow on this day and sees its shadow, it will retreat to its den and winter will go on for six more weeks; if it does not see its shadow, spring will arrive early. In 2026, the shadow was seen by Punxsutawney Phil, auguring six more weeks of winter.

While the tradition remains popular in the 21st century, studies have found no consistent association between a groundhog seeing its shadow and the subsequent arrival time of spring-like weather. The weather lore was brought from German-speaking areas where the badger (German: Dachs) is the forecasting animal, while in Hungary for example the bear serves the same purpose, and badgers were only watched when bears were not around. It is related to the lore that clear weather on the Christian festival of Candlemas predicts a prolonged winter.

The Groundhog Day ceremony held at Punxsutawney in western Pennsylvania, centering on a groundhog named Punxsutawney Phil, has become the most frequently attended ceremony. Grundsow Lodges in Pennsylvania Dutch Country in the southeastern part of the state observe the occasion as well. Other cities in the United States and Canada also have adopted the event.

== History ==
=== Origins ===
The Pennsylvania Dutch were immigrants from German-speaking areas of Europe. A German tradition marked Candlemas (February 2) as "Badger Day" (Dachstag): if a badger emerging from its sett encountered sunshine, and thereby cast a shadow, four more weeks of winter were predicted.

==== Germany ====
Various traditional superstitions in German folk religion continue to be linked with Candlemas, although this was discouraged by the Reformed Churches in the 16th century. Notably, several traditions that are part of weather lore use the weather at Candlemas to predict the start of spring. The weather-predicting animal on Candlemas was usually the badger, although regionally, the animal was the bear or the fox.

The original weather-predicting animal in Germany had been the bear, another hibernating mammal, but when they grew scarce, the lore became altered. Similarity to the groundhog lore has been noted for the German formula: Sonnt sich der Dachs in der Lichtmeßwoche, so geht er auf vier Wochen wieder zu Loche ("If the badger sunbathes during Candlemas-week, for four more weeks he will be back in his hole"). (Note: Noted by Uwe Johnson; the formula was printed in the Voß un Haas "Fox and Hare" calendars of Mecklenburg.) A slight variant is found in a collection of weather lore (Bauernregeln, lit. "farmers' rules") printed in Austria in 1823.

==== Groundhog as badger ====
The Pennsylvanians maintained the same tradition as the Germans on Groundhog Day, except that winter's spell would be prolonged for six weeks instead of four. For the Pennsylvania Dutch, the badger became the dox, which in Deitsch referred to "groundhog". (Note: "Of course everybody knows that February 2 is groundhog day. If the dox (the dialect word for groundhog) sees its shadow on this day, the belief is that six weeks of bad weather will follow".)

The standard term for "groundhog" was grun'daks (from German dachs), with the regional variant in York County being grundsau, a direct translation of the English name, according to a 19th-century book on the dialect. The form was a regional variant according to one 19th-century source. However, the weather superstition that begins Der zwet Hær'ning is Grund'sau dåk. Wânn di grundsau îr schâtte sent... ("February second is Groundhog day. If the groundhog sees its shadow...") is given as common to all fourteen counties in Dutch Pennsylvania Country, in a 1915 monograph. (Note: The letter "â" is actually "a with circumflex below".)

In The Thomas R. Brendle Collection of Pennsylvania German Folklore, Brendle preserved the following lore from the local Pennsylvania German dialect:

Wann der Dachs sei Schadde seht im Lichtmess Marye, dann geht er widder in's Loch un beleibt noch sechs Woche drin. Wann Lichtmess Marye awwer drieb is, dann bleibt der dachs haus un's watt noch enanner Friehyaahr.

When the groundhog sees his shadow on the morning of Mary Candlemas, he will again go into his hole and remain there for six weeks. But if the morning of Mary Candlemas is overcast, the groundhog will remain outside and there will be another spring.

The form grundsow has been used by the lodge in Allentown and elsewhere. Brendle also recorded the name "Grundsaudag" (Groundhog day in Lebanon County) and "Daxdaag" (Groundhog day in Northampton County).

Victor Hugo, in "Les Misérables", (1864) discusses the day as follows:

"...it was the second of February, that ancient Candlemas-day whose treacherous sun, the precursor of six weeks of cold, inspired Matthew Laensberg with the two lines, which have deservedly become classic:

'Qu'il luise ou qu'il luiserne,
L'ours rentre en sa caverne.'

"Let it gleam or let it glimmer,
The bear goes back into his cave."

– Hugo, Victor. "Les Misérables." Trans. Fahnestock and MacAfee, based on Wilbour. Signet Classics, NY, 1987. p. 725.

==== Bear-rat ====
The groundhog was once also known by the obsolete Latin alias Arctomys monax. The genus name signified "bear-rat". The European marmot is of the same genus and was formerly called Arctomys alpinus. It was speculated that the European counterpart might have lore similar to the groundhog attached to it. (Note: Signed "S. S. R." of Lancaster, Pennsylvania. Note that S. S. Rathvon wrote the editorial "The Ground-Hog" and "More of the Ground-hogs" where he refers to the creature as "Old Arctomyx" in the editorial in the March 1884 issue of the Lancaster Farmer XV:3.)

==== Simpler Candlemas lore ====
The German version, with the introduction of the badger (or other beasts), was an expansion of a simpler tradition that if the weather was sunny and clear on Candlemas Day, people expected winter to continue. The simpler version is summarized in the English (Scots dialect) couplet that runs "If Candlemas is fair and clear / There'll be twa winters in the year", (Note: A couplet the same as this except "two winters" in standard English is given in Davis (1985), p. 103, alongside two other variants.) (Note: "Second Winter" appears to be a neologism that paraphrases "two winters".) with equivalent phrases in French and German. And the existence of a corresponding Latin couplet has been suggested as evidence of the great antiquity of this tradition. (Note: "Si Sol splendescat Maria purificante / Major erit glacies post festum quam fuit ante". Note that Maria purificante or The Purification of the Blessed Virgin Mary is the reference to Candlemas day, since this is the biblical event that Candlemas is supposed to commemorate.)

==== British and Gaelic calendars ====
Scholar Rhys Carpenter in 1946 emphasized that the Badger Day tradition was strong in Germany, but absent in the British Isles, and he referred to this as a reason that the U.S. Groundhog Day was not brought by immigrants from these places.

There did exist a belief among Roman Catholics in Britain that the hedgehog predicted the length of winter, or so it has been claimed, but without demonstration of its age, in a publication by the Scotland-born American journalist Thomas C. MacMillan in 1886, and American writer/journalist Samuel Adams Drake's book published in 1900. (Note: Drake also states that the German lore about the badger predicting the winter's duration was firmly accepted in New England. The groundhog, badger/bear, and hedgehog are all noted as paralleling each other.)

In the Gaelic calendar of Ireland, Scotland, and the Isle of Man, Brigid's Day (February 1) is a day for predicting the weather. While in Scotland the animal that heralds spring on this day is a snake, (Note: Thig an nathair as an toll / Là donn Brìde, / Ged robh trì troighean dhen t-sneachd / Air leac an làir. — Translation: The serpent will come from the hole / On the brown Day of Bríde, / Though there should be three feet of snow / On the flat surface of the ground.) and on the Isle of Man a large bird, in Ireland folklorist Kevin Danaher records lore of hedgehogs being observed for this omen:

In Irish folk tradition St. Brighid's Day, 1 February, is the first day of Spring, and thus of the farmer's year. ... To see a hedgehog was a good weather sign, for the hedgehog comes come out of the hole in which he has spent the winter, looks about to judge the weather, and returns to his burrow if bad weather is going to continue. If he stays out, it means that he knows the mild weather is coming.

Additionally, the Roman rite for the goddess Februa had a procession performed on February 2, according to Yoder. The Roman calendar, in turn, had Celtic origins. February 2 concurs with Imbolc, one of the Celtic 'cross-quarter days', the four days which marked the midpoints between solstice and equinox.

=== Pennsylvania ===
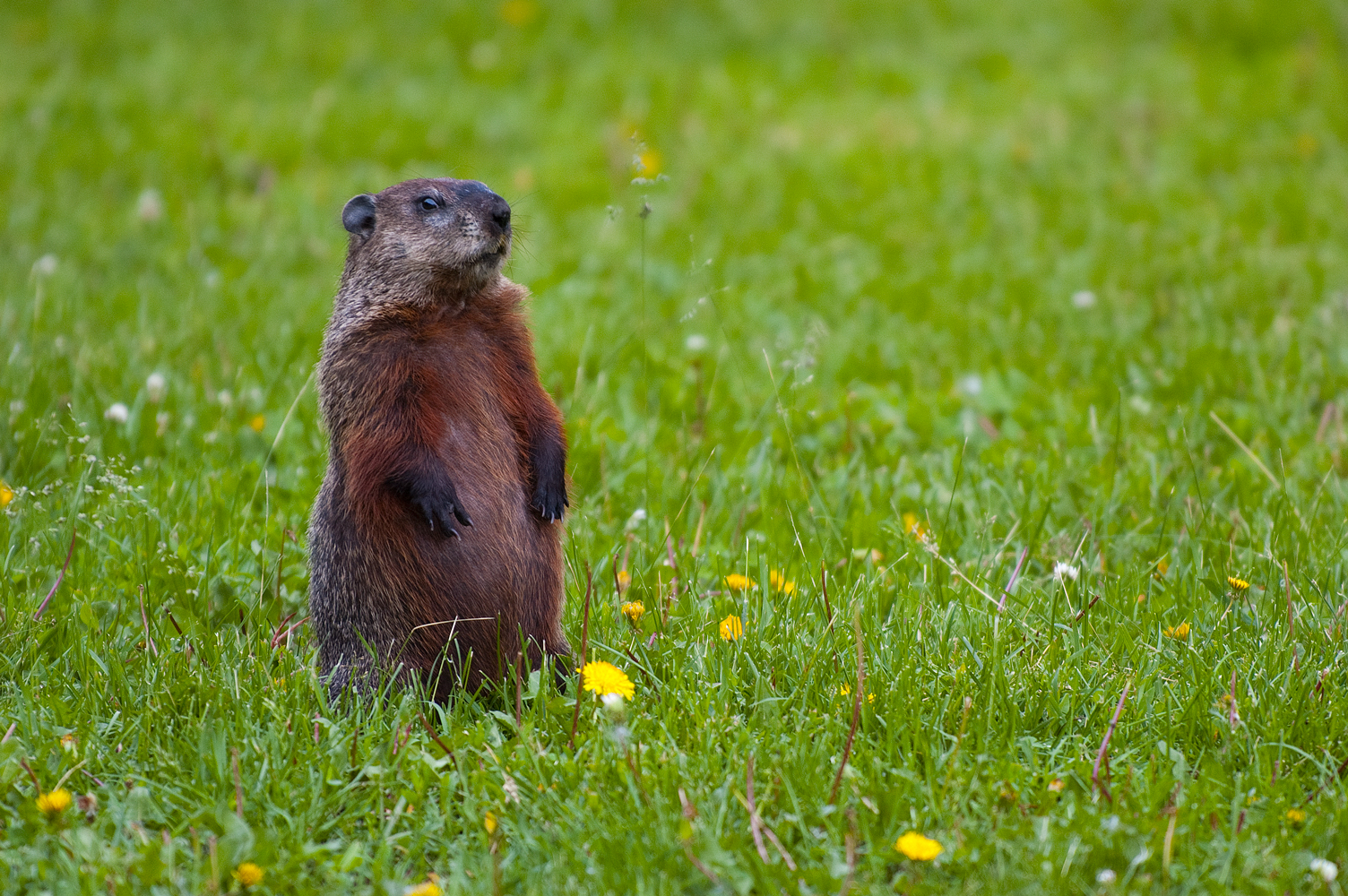
The groundhog (Marmota monax) is a hibernating rodent of the family Sciuridae, belonging to the group of large ground squirrels.

The observance of Groundhog Day in the United States first occurred in German communities in Pennsylvania, according to known records. The earliest mention of Groundhog Day is an entry on February 2, 1840, in the diary of James L. Morris of Morgantown, in Pennsylvania Dutch Country, according to the book on the subject by Don Yoder. This was a Welsh enclave but the diarist was commenting on his neighbors who were of German stock. (Note: February 2, 1840, read: "Today the Germans say the groundhog comes out of his winter quarters and if he sees his shadow he returns in and remains there 40 days.") (Note: Some sources stated that Morris's entry of February 4, 1841, was the oldest. It read: "Last Tuesday, the 2nd, was Candlemas day, the day on which, according to the Germans, the Groundhog peeps out of his winter quarters and if he sees his shadow he pops back for another six weeks nap, but if the day be cloudy he remains out, as the weather is to be moderate.")

==== Punxsutawney Phil ====
The first reported news of a Groundhog Day observance was arguably made by the Punxsutawney Spirit newspaper of Punxsutawney, Pennsylvania, in 1886: (Note: Some books attribute this positively to Clymer Freas.) "up to the time of going to press, the beast has not seen its shadow". However, it was not until the following year in 1887 that the first Groundhog Day considered "official" was commemorated there, with a group making a trip to the Gobbler's Knob part of town to consult the groundhog. People have gathered annually at the spot for the event ever since.

Clymer Freas (1867–1942) (Note: Also styled H. C. Freas, H. Clymer Freas, or Clymer H. Freas) who was city editor at the Punxsutawney Spirit is credited as the "father" who conceived the idea of "Groundhog Day". (Note: Other contemporaries of Freas (his colleagues at the paper and fellow-members of the club, etc.) have been given credit for the promotion of Groundhog Day: W. O. Smith, another editor of the paper and later elected to U. S. Congress, cartoonist C. M. Payne, and John P. Cowan of the Pittsburgh Gazette.) It has also been suggested that Punxsutawney was where all the Groundhog Day events originated, from where it spread to other parts of the United States and Canada.

The Groundhog Day celebrations of the 1880s were carried out by the Punxsutawney Elks Lodge. The lodge members were the "genesis" of the Groundhog Club formed later, which continued the Groundhog Day tradition. But the lodge started out being interested in the groundhog as a game animal for food. It had started to serve groundhog at the lodge, and had been organizing a hunting party on a day each year in late summer.

The chronologies given are somewhat inconsistent in the literature. The first "Groundhog Picnic" was held in 1887 according to one source, but given as post-circa-1889 by a local historian in a journal. The historian states that around 1889 the meat was served in the lodge's banquet, and the organized hunt started after that.

Either way, the Punxsutawney Groundhog Club was formed in 1899, and continued the hunt and "Groundhog Feast", which took place annually in September. The "hunt" portion of it became increasingly a ritualized formality, because the practical procurement of meat had to occur well ahead of time for marinating. The flavor has been described as a "cross between pork and chicken". A drink called the "groundhog punch" was also served. (Note: a combination of vodka, milk, eggs and orange juice, among many other ingredients.) The hunt and feast did not attract enough outside interest, and the practice was discontinued.

The groundhog was not named Phil until 1961, possibly as an indirect reference to Prince Philip, Duke of Edinburgh.

The largest Groundhog Day celebration is held in Punxsutawney, Pennsylvania, where crowds as large as 40,000 gather each year, nearly eight times the year-round population of the town which is 5,769 as of 2020. The average draw had been about 2,000 until the 1993 film Groundhog Day, which is set at the festivities in Punxsutawney, after which attendance rose to about 10,000.

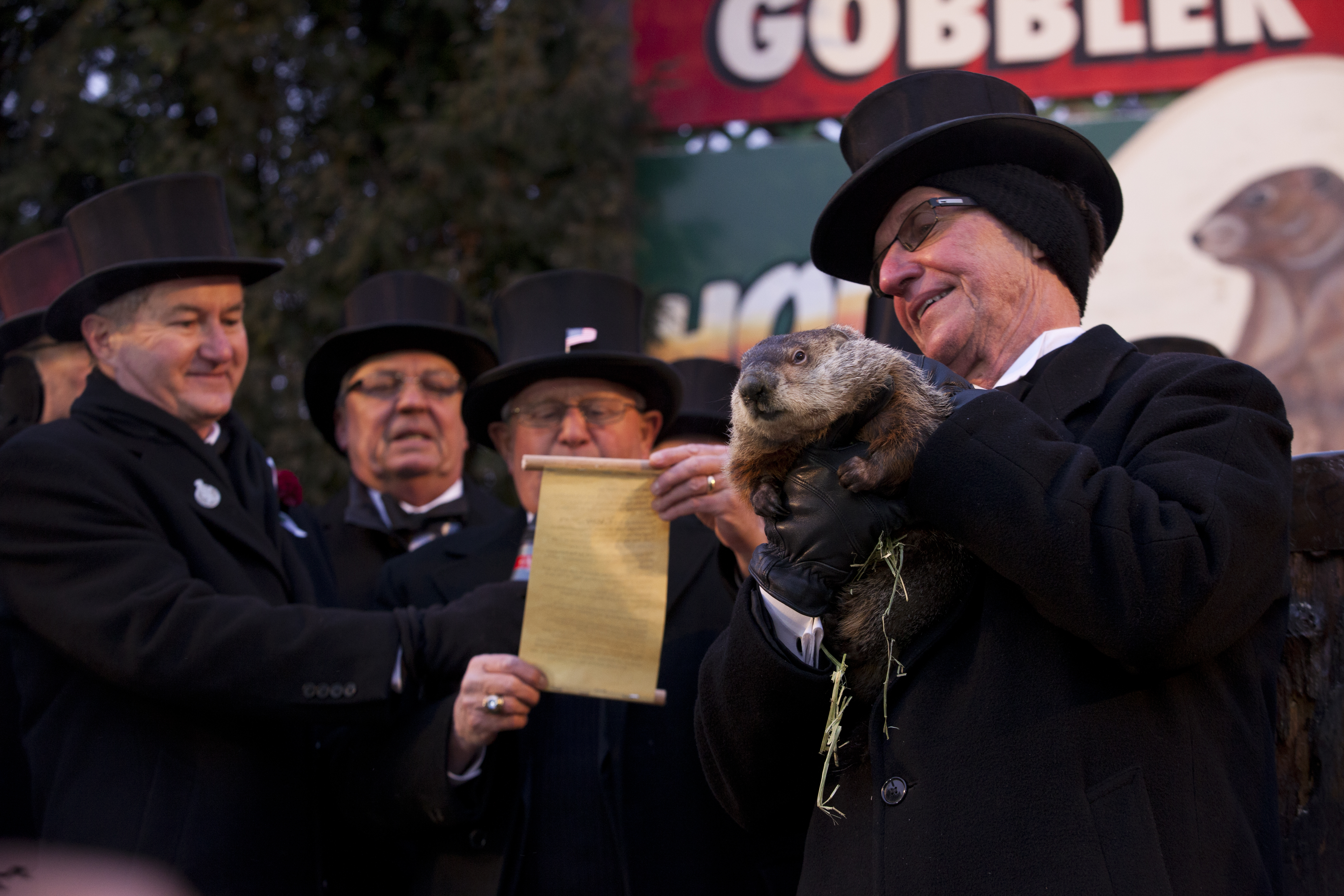
Groundhog Day, Punxsutawney, 2013

The official Phil is a supercentenarian, having been the same forecasting beast since 1887. For the past several years, the event has been live streamed, allowing more people than ever to watch the animal meteorologist.

The ceremony was held behind closed doors for the first time in 2021, due to COVID-19 pandemic restrictions.

== Regional celebrations ==
=== United States ===
==== Mid-Atlantic ====
The Slumbering Groundhog Lodge, which was formed in 1907, has carried out the ceremonies that take place in Quarryville, Pennsylvania. It used to be a contending rival to Punxsutawney over the Groundhog Day fame. It employs a taxidermic specimen (stuffed woodchuck).

In Southeastern Pennsylvania, Groundhog Lodges (Grundsow Lodges) celebrate the holiday with fersommlinge, social events in which food is served, speeches are made, and one or more g'spiel (plays or skits) are performed for entertainment. The Pennsylvania German dialect is the only language spoken at the event, and those who speak English pay a penalty, usually in the form of a nickel, dime, or quarter per word spoken, with the money put into a bowl in the center of the table. In select locations, such as Myerstown (where Uni is the resident groundhog), if February 2 lands on a Sunday, the ceremonies are moved to February 1. Most of these celebrations outside of Punxsutawney have switched to taxidermied specimens, stuffed toys or costumed characters instead of a live groundhog as of 2026.

Chuckles, a self-proclaimed woodchuck, has been providing the regional weather prognostication in Manchester, Connecticut since 1968 at the Lutz Children's Museum. According to tradition, Chuckles whispers his prediction into the ear of the town mayor, the only Connecticut public official who speaks "groundhog-ese", who then announces it to a crowd of citizens and state officials including the governor. The celebration is traditionally broadcast live by local television station WFSB and participating radio affiliates. An analysis of historical weather data and Chuckles' previous predictions reveals he offers a 60% accuracy rate, higher than most other weather-predicting animals nationwide. Notably, in 2024, Chuckles predicted an early spring (alongside Punxsutawney Phil and others) but Winter Storm Birch followed soon after, prompting the local police department of Guilford, Connecticut to issue a warrant and dubbing the rodent "Chuck the Liar". In a show of good will, Chuckles "turned himself in", but his record of previous accuracy and community service allowed him to be released.

In Milltown, New Jersey, Milltown Mel was purchased in 2008 in Sunbury, Pennsylvania, by Jerry and Cathy Guthlein, and lived in a cage in the Guthleins' back yard. Mel's first event was at the family business, the Bronson and Guthlein Funeral Home, with later events moved to the American Legion Post, with free coffee and doughnuts served afterwards. Mel died in 2021.) The state of New Jersey has prohibited the procurement of a replacement groundhog and seized a groundhog the town had procured from Tennessee because of rabies control laws. New Jersey Governor Phil Murphy vetoed a bill that would have allowed for the event to resume.

Stonewall Jackson predicts at Space Farms Zoo and Museum.

Essex Ed the groundhog and Otis the Hedgehog predict at Turtle Back Zoo.

“Malverne Mel” is the groundhog of Malverne, in Long Island, New York. Mel began his position in 1996.

Great Neck Greta, of Great Neck, Long Island, New York, predicted in 2020.

Quigley, of The Hamptons (resident of the Save the Animals Rescue Foundation), predicts at Quogue Village Fire Department.

Staten Island Chuck is the stage name for the official weather-forecasting woodchuck for New York City, housed in the Staten Island Zoo. In 2009, Chuck bit then-NYC-Mayor Mike Bloomberg, prompting zoo officials to quietly replace him with his daughter Charlotte. In 2014, NYC Mayor Bill de Blasio, famously dropped Charlotte during the ceremony, visibly disturbing many of the children present for the event. Charlotte's untimely death a week later prompted rumors she was killed by the fall, although the zoo later said this was unlikely to be the cause of Charlotte's demise. As a result, Bill de Blasio did not participate in the tradition thereafter.

Dunkirk Dave (a stage name for numerous groundhogs that have filled the role since 1960) is the local groundhog for Western New York, handled by Bob Will, a typewriter repairman who runs a rescue shelter for groundhogs. Will is adamant that Dunkirk Dave does not actually predict the date of spring because that is fixed by calendars, but instead predicts the harshness of the remainder of winter. An additional groundhog was added in Buffalo in 2014 but this groundhog—Buffalo Bert— is in jest in that he always sees his shadow, as an inside joke to Buffalo's winters; the Irish pub that hosts the event jokes that Bert's constant predictions of winter give him a 100% accuracy rate.

French Creek Freddie is West Virginia's resident groundhog meteorologist. A resident of the West Virginia State Wildlife Center in French Creek, West Virginia, Freddie made his debut in 1978, and boasts an accuracy rate of approximately 50%. On Groundhog Day, 2022, Freddie predicted six more weeks of winter, with the mayor of Buckhannon and members of the community in attendance.

In Maryland, Queen City Charlie handles ceremonies in the western part of the state, having succeeded Western Maryland Murray after Murray's June 2021 death.

Holtsville Hal resides at the Holtsville Ecology Site and Animal Preserve in Holtsville, NY. He predicts the weather for Suffolk County, NY, in front of hundreds of residents each Groundhog Day.

Chesapeake Chuck resides the Virginia Living Museum in Newport News, VA. He predicts the weather for the Hampton Roads. Other animal predictions on upcoming current events also take place throughout the celebration.

==== Midwest ====
In the Midwest, Sun Prairie, Wisconsin, is the self-proclaimed "Groundhog Capital of the World". This title taken in response to the Punxsutawney Spirit's 1952 newspaper article describing Sun Prairie as a "remote two cow village buried somewhere in the wilderness..." In 2015, Jimmy the Groundhog bit the ear of Mayor Jon Freund and the story quickly went viral worldwide. The next day a mayoral proclamation absolved Jimmy XI of any wrongdoing.

Buckeye Chuck, Ohio's official State Groundhog, is one of two weather-predicting groundhogs. He resides in Marion, Ohio.

Woodstock Willie, in Woodstock, Illinois, the shooting location for the 1993 film Groundhog Day.

Concord Casimir, while not a groundhog, was a weather-predicting cat whose forecast was based on how he ate his annual pierogi meal. He resided in Concord, Ohio, on the outskirts of Cleveland. He died in 2026.

==== The South ====
In Washington, D.C., the Dupont Circle Groundhog Day event features Potomac Phil, another taxidermic specimen. From his first appearance in 2012 to 2018, Phil's spring predictions invariably agreed with those of the more lively Punxsutawney Phil, who made his predictions half an hour earlier. In addition, Phil always predicted correctly six more months of political gridlock. However, after being accused of collusion in 2018, Potomac Phil contradicted Punxsutawney Phil in 2019, and further, predicted two more years of political insanity.

Birmingham Bill, at Birmingham Zoo, was "taking a break" from predicting in 2015. Since then, a surrogate, "Birmingham Jill," has filled in for Bill to allow Bill to continue his natural hibernation cycle. As of 2026, the role of Birmingham Jill is played by an opossum.

In Raleigh, North Carolina, an annual event at the North Carolina Museum of Natural Sciences included Sir Walter Wally. According to museum officials, Wally had been correct 58% of the time vs. Punxsutawney Phil's 39%. Sir Walter Wally retired after 2022 leaving Snerd of Garner as the only weather-predicting groundhog in the state.

Elsewhere in the American South, the General Beauregard Lee makes predictions from Lilburn, Georgia (later Butts County, Georgia). The University of Dallas in Irving, Texas has boasted of hosting the second largest Groundhog celebration in the world.

==== Western US ====
Aurora, Colorado forecasts with a yellow-bellied marmot named Stormy Marmot.

Boulder, Colorado celebrates with Flatiron Freddy, who makes his appearance in a different manner each year.

The Oregon Zoo in Portland, Has a weather predicting Beaver, called "Stumptown Fil." Fil predicts through two treats placed on logs, each treat has a piece of paper in front of it with the prediction, the prediction in front of the treat he eats first is declared his prediction.

=== Canada ===
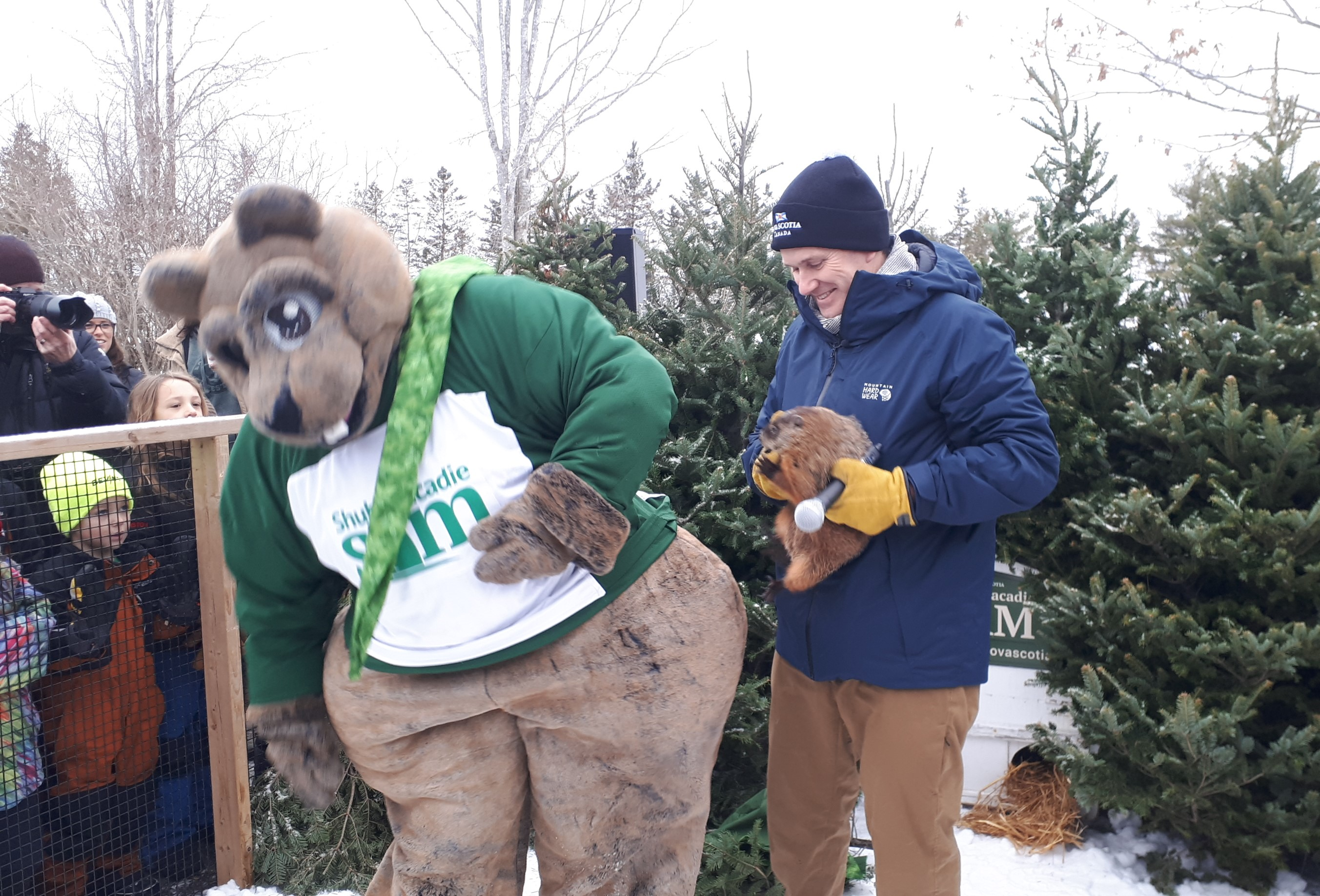
Shubenacadie Sam makes the winter prediction at Nova Scotia's Shubenacadie Wildlife Park, 2024

The day is observed with various ceremonies at other locations in North America beyond the United States.

In Nova Scotia, Groundhog Day traditions arrived with German Foreign Protestant immigrants in the 1750s where it was known as "Daks Day" (from the German dachs) in the German dialect of Lunenburg County settlers.) Due to Nova Scotia's Atlantic Time Zone, the province's official groundhog, Shubenacadie Sam makes the first Groundhog Day prediction in North America, a tradition at Nova Scotia's Shubenacadie Wildlife Park since 1987.

In French Canada, where the day is known as Jour de la marmotte, Fred la marmotte of Val-d'Espoir was the representative forecaster for the province of Quebec from 2009 until his death in 2023. A study also shows that in Quebec, the marmot and groundhog (siffleux) are regarded as Candlemas weather-predicting beasts in some scattered spots, but the bear is the more usual animal. (Note: There were beliefs in Switzerland and France that the marmot predicted the weather, according to MacMillan. "S. S. R." also speculated there might be similar lore for the European marmot, Arctomys alpinus.)

Wiarton Willie forecasts annually from Wiarton, Ontario.

Manitoba Merv has been forecasting since the 1990s, at Oak Hammock Marsh.

Winnipeg Wyn was forecasting starting in the 2010s, at Prairie Wildlife Rehabilitation Centre. Wyn died in 2020.

Balzac Billy is the "Prairie Prognosticator", a man-sized groundhog mascot who prognosticates weather on Groundhog Day from Balzac, Alberta.

Nanaimo, a ferry port city on Vancouver Island in British Columbia, Canada present Chopper, Marlu, and Van Isle Violet, all wild Vancouver Island marmots, for forecasts, via the Marmot Recovery Foundation.

== Accuracy ==
=== Statistics ===
Punxsutawney Phil's statistics are kept by the Pennsylvania's Groundhog Club which cares for the animal. Phil has predicted 106 forecasts for winter and 21 for an early spring. One year he had a partial shadow, in 1942. There were 10 years when Phil's prediction was not recorded, all of which occurred in the 1880s and 1890s. There has been one year when the event was canceled (1943) due to World War II.

Most assessments of Phil's accuracy have given an accuracy lower than would be expected with random chance. Stormfax Almanac gives Phil an estimate of 39% accuracy. Meteorologist Tim Roche of Weather Underground gives Phil a 36% accuracy rate between 1969 and 2016, a range chosen because local weather data was most reliable from 1969 onward, and a 47% accuracy record in that time span when predicting early spring. The National Centers for Environmental Information, using a basic metric of above-normal temperatures for early spring and below-normal temperatures for more winter, placed Punxsutawney Phil's accuracy at 40% for the ten-year period preceding 2019.

The Farmer's Almanac, which itself has been known for forecasts of questionable accuracy, gives an assessment of "exactly 50 percent" accuracy. The National Geographic Society reports a 28% success rate. A Middlebury College team found that Phil's long-term analysis of temperature high/low predictions were 70% accurate, although when the groundhog predicted early spring it was usually wrong. Canadian meteorologist Cindy Day has estimated that Nova Scotia's "Shubenacadie Sam" has an accuracy rate of about 45%, compared to 25% for Wiarton Willy in Ontario.

A 2021 study by Lakehead University climatologists compared 530 predictions by 33 weather-predicting groundhogs to the beginning of spring weather. It used the locally recorded blossoming of the spring wildflower Carolina Spring Beauty as an indicator of the arrival of spring weather. The study concluded that groundhog predictions are pure chance, with an accuracy rate of 50%. Punxsutawney Phil was scored an accuracy rate of 52% with Ontario's Wiarton Willie at 54% and 65% for Nova Scotia's Shubenacadie Sam, all below 75% score regarded as reliable by the study. A high reliability rate was achieved by only two groundhogs: Oil Springs Ollie in Oil Springs, Ontario and Essex Ed in Essex, Connecticut. Several noted groundhogs were wrong over 70% of the time including Buckeye Chuck in Marion, Ohio; Dunkirk Dave in Dunkirk, New York and Holland Huckleberry in Holland, Ohio.

Part of the problem with pinning down an accuracy rate for the groundhog is that what constitutes an early spring is not clearly defined. Assessments of the accuracy of other groundhogs such as Staten Island Chuck use an objective formula. In Chuck's case, a majority of days that reach 40 °F (4 °C) in New York City between Groundhog Day and the March equinox.

Another challenge has been the haphazard nature of Groundhog Day recordkeeping, making it difficult to find reliable historical prognostications. The situation has improved in recent years, as Groundhog Day prediction data is now available in a machine-readable format similar to weather data.

=== Pseudoscientific evaluation ===
Prediction based on an animal's behavior used to be given more credence in the past, when stores of food became scarce as winter progressed.

One theory states that the groundhog naturally comes out of hibernation in central Pennsylvania in early February because of the increasing average temperature. Under this theory, if German settlement had been centered further north, Groundhog Day would take place at a later date. However, the observed behavior of groundhogs in central New Jersey was that they mostly come out of their burrows in mid-March, regardless of Groundhog Day weather.

== Similar customs ==
In Croatia and Serbia, Orthodox Christians have a tradition that on February 2 (Candlemas) or February 15 (Sretenje, The Meeting of the Lord), the bear will awaken from winter dormancy, and if it sees (meets) its own shadow in this sleepy and confused state, it will get scared and go back to sleep for an additional 40 days, thus prolonging the winter. Thus, if it is sunny on Sretenje, it is a sign that the winter is not over yet. If it is cloudy, it is a good sign that the winter is about to end.

Similarly in Germany, on the June 27, they recognize the Seven Sleepers' Day (Siebenschläfertag). If it rains that day, the rest of summer is supposedly going to be rainy. As well, in the United Kingdom, July 15 is known as St. Swithin's day. It was traditionally believed that, if it rained on that day, it would rain for the next 40 days and nights.

Also in Catalonia, Candlemas was traditionally identified in mountainous areas of Catalonia as the date that bears awake from hibernation: "per la Candelera, l'ós surt de l'ossera" ("on Candlemas, the bear leaves its den").

== Popular culture ==
The holiday gained more prominence, particularly internationally, with the release of the 1993 comedy film Groundhog Day with Bill Murray and Andie MacDowell. The film became the 13th highest grossing of the year, with over $70 million at the box office. Over time, the film became a cult classic and significantly increased awareness and attendance at Groundhog Day events.

The holiday's origins also play a prominent role in the 1979 Rankin/Bass holiday special Jack Frost. Groundhog prognosticator Pardon-Me Pete's shadow is manipulated by Jack Frost to buy more time to use his wintery magic to protect January Junction from the villain. Over the years since there has become a proper agreement between the two to give Jack more time for wintery fun in exchange for Pete getting extra hibernation time.
