= Shubenacadie Wildlife Park =

Shubenacadie Provincial Wildlife Park
- Interactive map of Shubenacadie Provincial Wildlife Park
- 45.0936208°N 63.393184°W
- Date opened: 1954
- Location: Shubenacadie, Nova Scotia, Canada
- Land area: 40 ha (99 acres)
- No. of animals: 123
- No. of species: 53
- Website: wildlifepark.novascotia.ca

The Shubenacadie Provincial Wildlife Park is a government-operated wildlife park located in Shubenacadie, Nova Scotia, Canada. The 40-hectare park includes animals, an interpretive nature centre operated by Ducks Unlimited Canada, hiking trails, a picnic area and playground.

== History ==
The park began in the late 1940s as a refuge for orphaned white-tailed deer run by Eldon Pace. By the early 1950s, there was so much interest from the public that the park officially opened in 1954. Mr. Pace was the superintendent of the park until 1988.

Over the decades the park has expanded and developed into one of Nova Scotia's most popular tourist sites. Throughout the park's history countless orphaned and injured animals, birds and reptiles have been cared for and rehabilitated. From the beginning, the park has been educating visitors about wildlife and environmental issues with thousands of school children participating in onsite education programming.

Between 2003 and 2008 the park was regulated as a game sanctuary under the Wildlife Act (R.S.N.S. 1989, c. 504). In 2008 the regulations were changed to officially designate the park as a wildlife park under the act.

The park is open 9 am to 6:30 pm seven days a week between May 15 and October 15, and 9 am to 3 pm weekends only between October 16 and May 14.

== Animals ==
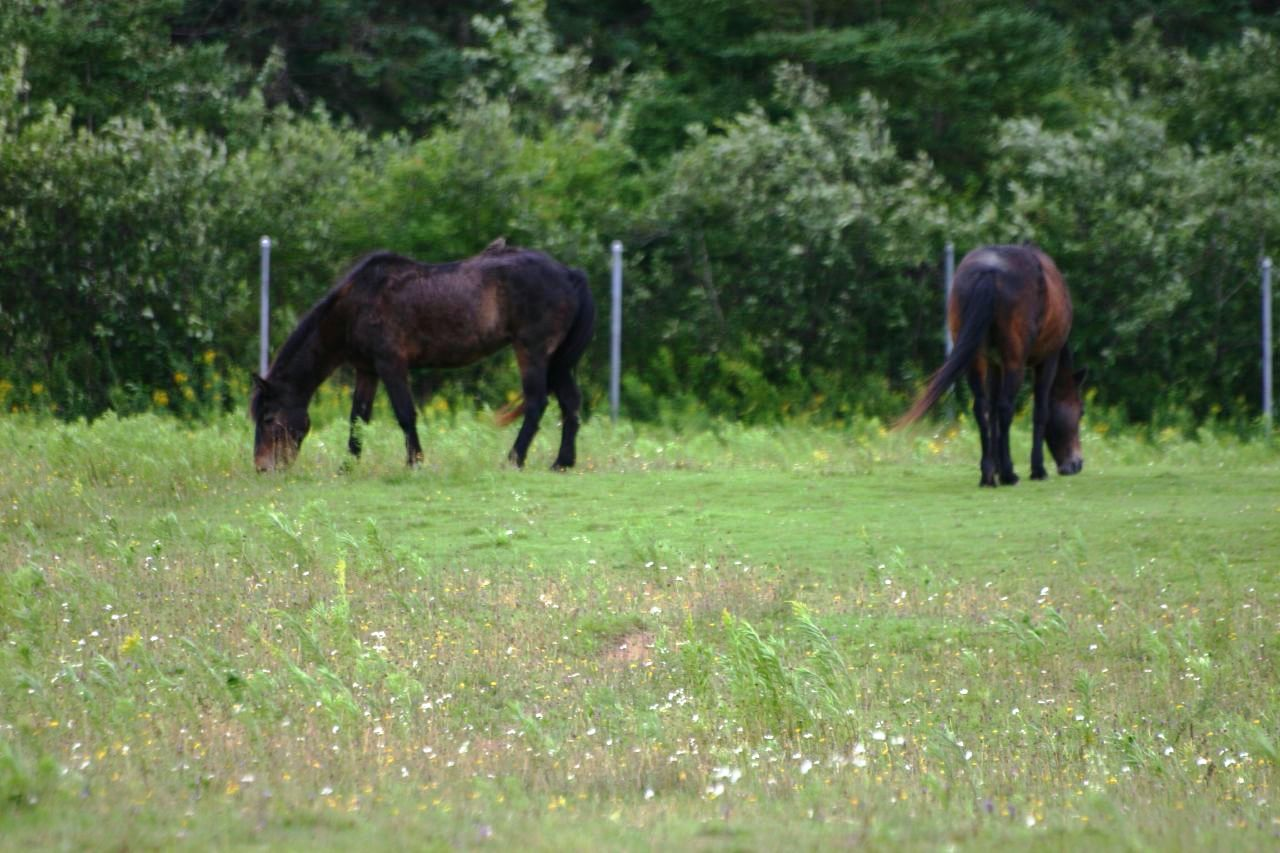
Sable Island Horses at the Shubenacadie Wildlife Park

The park is home to over 50 species of mammals and birds, many of which have permanent injuries or cannot be released into the wild.

The full list of mammal species displayed at the park includes the Dall sheep, Bighorn sheep, Goats, Elk, Red deer, White-tailed deer, Eastern coyotes, Wolves, Red foxes, American martens, American mink, Striped skunk, North American beavers, Groundhogs, Patagonian mara, Porcupine, Snowshoe hare, Bobcats, Cougar, Eurasian lynx, American black bears, and the Raccoons.

The full list of birds displayed at the park includes the Bald eagles, Barred owls, Black vultures, Great horned owls, Peregrine falcons, Red-tailed hawks, Turkey vultures, Emu, Reeves's pheasants, Himalayan monals, Swinhoe's pheasant, Cheer pheasant, Lady Amherst's pheasant, Golden pheasants, Silver pheasants, Mikado pheasants, Helmeted guineafowl, and Mrs. Hume's pheasant.

Additionally, the park also has several captive waterfowl, including Canada geese, Mute swans, and American Pekins. Due to the worldwide outbreak of Avian influenza, these birds, along with the Peafowl, have been temporarily taken off display.

Shubenacadie Wildlife Park was formerly home to the only Sable Island horses in captivity, until they died in 2019.

== Shubenacadie Sam ==
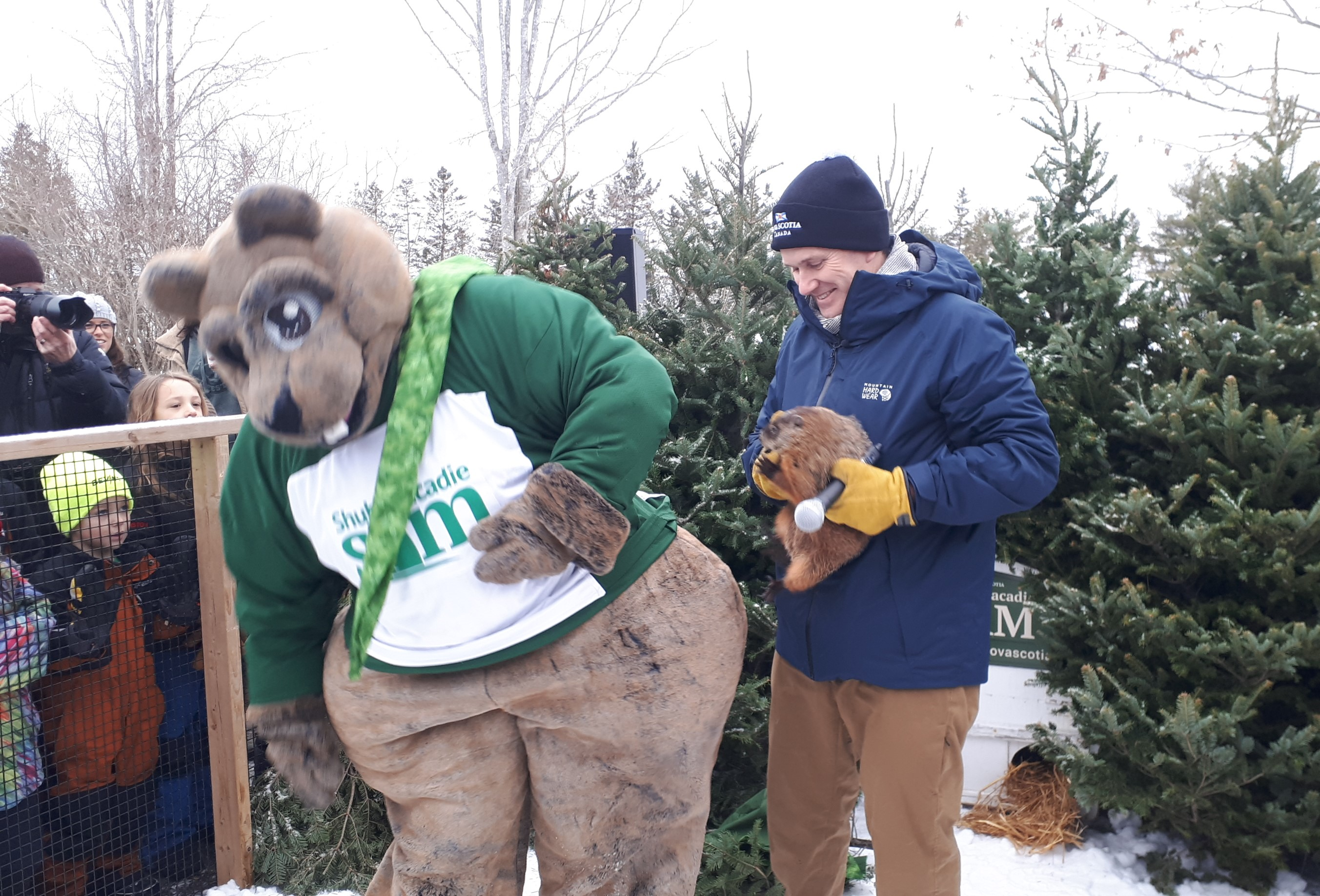
Shubenacadie Sam and mascot make the winter prediction, 2024

The Wildlife Park is home to Shubenacadie Sam, the first groundhog in North America to make a prediction on Groundhog Day thanks to Nova Scotia's Atlantic Time Zone. The groundhog's prediction happens at 8 am in a public ceremony that draws several hundred people to the park every year since 1987 and is now broadcast on Facebook and Twitter.

A local author named Doretta Groenendyk released a book about Shubenacadie Sam titled "Groundhog Night" in September 2022, which tells a story about Sam visiting the animals in the park and preparing for his appearance on Groundhog Day. The story is also displayed on signs around the park, for visitors to read as they visit the animal enclosures.

== Greenwing Legacy Centre ==
The Shubenacadie Wildlife Park is home to the Greenwing Legacy Centre, a collaboration project between Ducks Unlimited Canada and the Nova Scotia Department of Lands and Forestry. The centre offers educational programming and interactive activities such as bird-watching, as well as a gift shop, and it maintains and operates the St. Andrew's Marsh Trail and several other wetland walking trails.
