= Shubenacadie Sam =

Groundhog in Nova Scotia, Canada

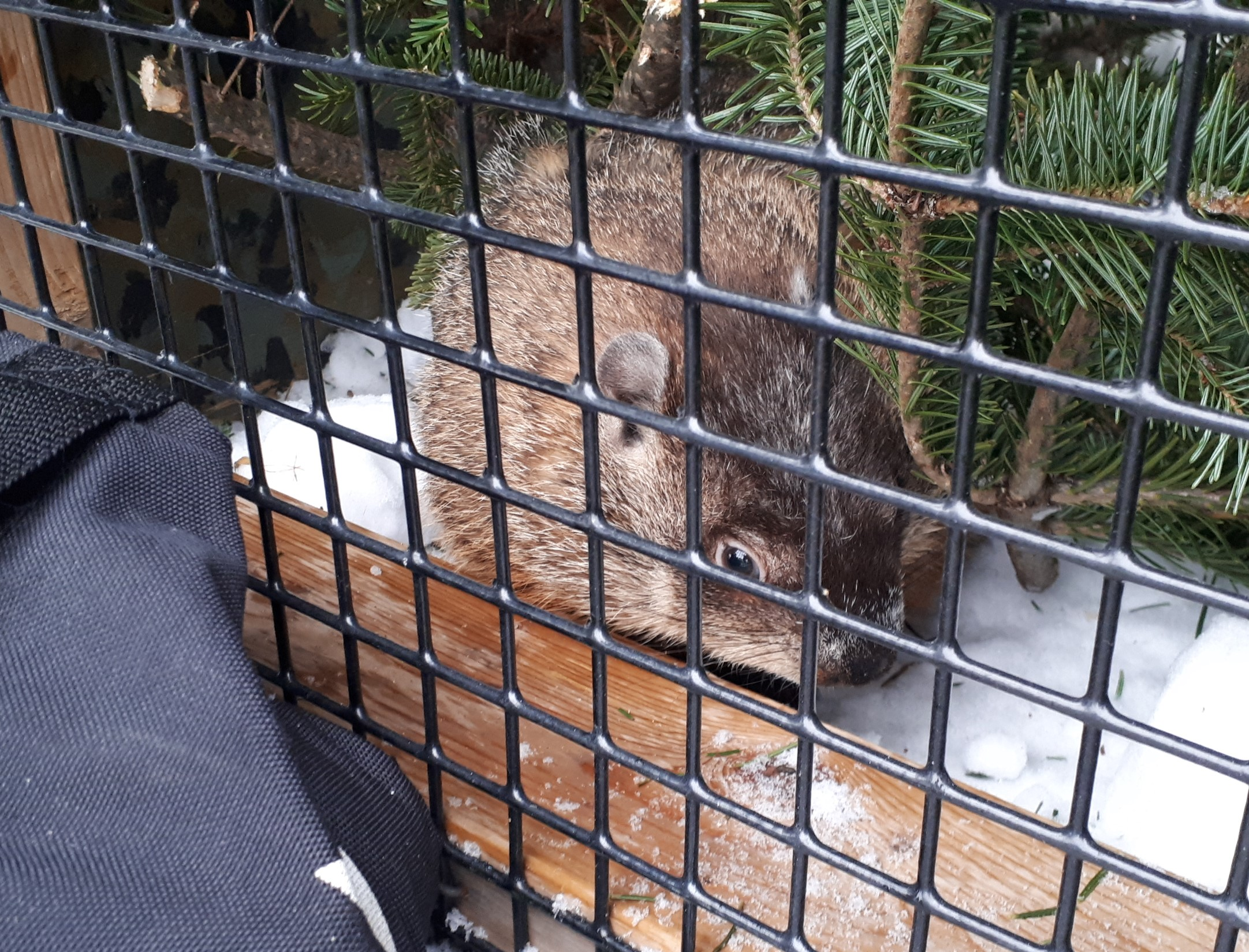
Shubenacadie Sam greets admirers after her 2024 prediction.

Shubenacadie Sam is a female Canadian groundhog who lives at the Shubenacadie Wildlife Park in the town of Shubenacadie, Nova Scotia. Every February 2, on Groundhog Day, Sam's shadow is closely observed at 08:00 AST to make the traditional prediction whether there will be an early spring. Due to Nova Scotia's Atlantic Time Zone, Sam makes the first Groundhog Day prediction in North America.

The prediction ceremony draws an early-morning festive crowd of about 200 families and visitors to the wildlife park, sometimes heralded by a groundhog mascot, bagpiper and town crier. The wildlife park, usually only open on weekends in the winter, changes its seasonal hours to open especially for the annual ritual. Shubenacadie Sam predicted an early spring in 2026.

== History ==
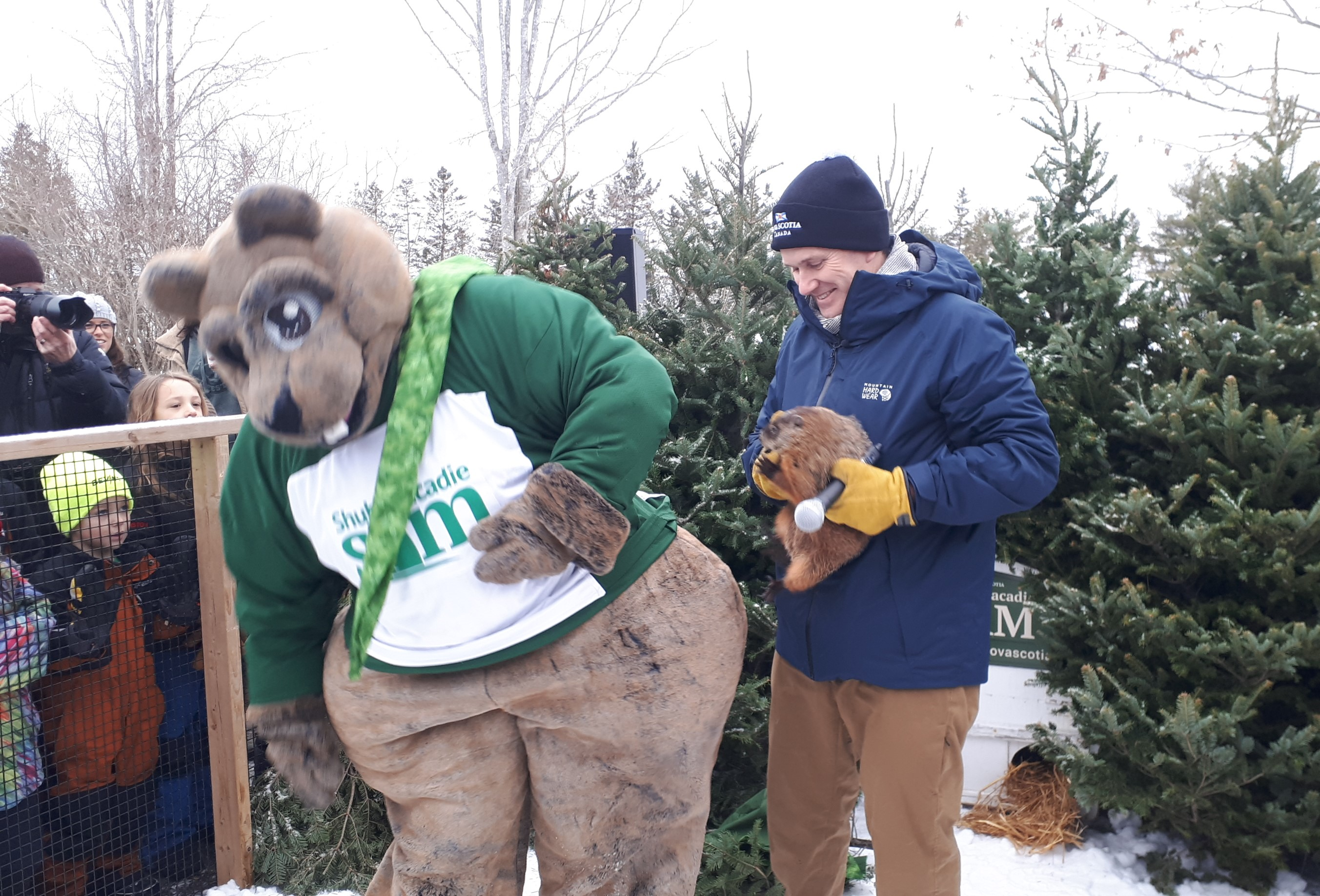
Shubenacadie Sam and mascot make the winter prediction, 2024

Nova Scotian Groundhog Day traditions arrived with German Foreign Protestant immigrants in the 1750s who settled around Lunenburg where the day was known as "Daks Day" (from the German dachs for badger) after the belief that badgers could predict the coming of spring on February 2. The Shubenacadie Sam tradition at the wildlife park began about 1987 and differs from most other famous groundhogs as he is not woken from hibernation for Groundhog Day. By 2018, four ground hogs had served as "Shubenacadie Sam" since the practice began in Nova Scotia, as groundhogs usually live 10-15 years in captivity. In 2021, a 7-year-old female groundhog, "Samantha", assumed the prediction duties. Park employees have served as the caretaker for Shubenacadie Sam and the park's groundhogs for over 20 years. They provide breakfast for the groundhog, usually yogurt and melon. Staff also read to the groundhog who has been designated an advocate for Family Literacy Day. Shubenacadie Sam inspired a children's book in 2022. Pages of the book are displayed around the park offering visitors a groundhog tour of the park. The ceremony was held virtually by web streaming during the COVID-19 pandemic in 2021 and 2022 but live gatherings resumed in 2023. The park cancelled the public event in 2026 due to blizzard conditions but announced Sam predicted an early spring.

== Biting incident ==
In 2018, Sam bit the finger of CBC reporter Brett Ruskin when the reporter grabbed the groundhog to stop Sam from climbing out of the groundhog enclosure.

== Predictions ==
Shubenacadie Sam's prediction, like all weather-predicting groundhogs, bears little relation to seasonal weather trends as it is based on random location conditions, according to Meteorologist Cindy Day. Based on a 2018 review of Shubenacadie Sam predictions by Day, the Nova Scotia groundhog had an accuracy rate of about 45%, according to Day, compared to 39% for Punxsutawney Phil and 25% for Wiarton Willie. A 2021 study by Lakehead University climatologists of 33 predicting groundhogs, including of 20 years of Shubenacadie Sam predictions, found that Shubenacadie Sam was correct 65% of the time. This was better than 52% accuracy for Punxsutawney Phil and 54% for Wiarton Willie, but still below 75% score regarded as reliable by the study, a reliability rate achieved by only two groundhogs, one in Oil Springs, Ontario and one in Essex, Connecticut. Overall, the study concluded that groundhog day predictions were random with an average success rate of only 50-50.

2026	"Early Spring"
2025	"Long Winter"
2024	"Early Spring"
2023	"Long Winter"
2022	"Long Winter"
2021	"Early Spring"
2020	"Long Winter"
2019	"Long Winter"
2018	"Early Spring"
2017	"Early Spring"
2016	"Early Spring"
2015	“Long Winter"
2014	“Early Spring"
2013	“Long winter"
2012	"Early spring"
2011	"Early spring"
2010	"Long winter"
2009	"Long winter"
2008	"Early Spring"
2007	"Early spring"
2006	"Early Spring"

== Background ==
While Shubenacadie offers the earliest prediction every year, it is one of many towns throughout North America known for their winter-predicting groundhogs. The most famous is Punxsutawney Phil of Punxsutawney, Pennsylvania, United States. The most famous Canadian groundhog is Wiarton Willie in Ontario, Canada. Sam shares the Nova Scotia prediction every year with "Two Rivers Tunnel" in Cape Breton at the Two Rivers Wildlife Park in Mira River, Nova Scotia, although "Two Rivers Tunnel" is awakened for its prediction just after 11 am instead of 8 am. Promoters of a lobster festival in Barrington Passage, Nova Scotia created a "Lucy the Lobster" ritual in 2018 with a lobster that crawled from the water to a lobster trap on Groundhog Day.
