= Gus the groundhog =

Advertising mascot of the Pennsylvania Lottery

Gus the Groundhog
- Keep on scratchin'!
- First appearance: 2004
- Created by: Pennsylvania Lottery
- Voiced by: Jeff Bergman (2004–2012); Robb Del Casale (2015–present)

In-universe information
- Species: Groundhog
- Gender: Male
- Family: Grandma Gus; Gabby (girlfriend)
- Nationality: American

Gus is the "spokesgroundhog" (groundhog spokesperson) for Pennsylvania Lottery instant scratch-off lottery games. He has appeared in over 80 advertisements during the periods of 2004–2012 and 2015–present.

The original concept for Gus was created by MARC USA, an advertising agency based in Pittsburgh, Pennsylvania. The concept was brought to life as an animatronic groundhog, created in 2004 by The Character Shop, Inc., a Hollywood creature effects company.

Gus is billed as the "second most famous groundhog in Pennsylvania", as a nod to Punxsutawney Phil. His tag line is "keep on scratchin'!"

Gus appears in television commercials through the year, especially during the winter holiday season. The spots air in all television markets in Pennsylvania. As of February 2011, the Pennsylvania Lottery claimed that Gus has appeared in more than 40 commercials. Additionally, Gus has a girlfriend named Gabby. The two are shown visiting the Pocono Mountains, as a nod to the importance of romantic tourism to that region's economy. Other "family members" have also appeared in commercials.

Gus required five puppeteers (Rick Lazzarini, Stephen R. Blandino, Debra Smith, Bob Mano, and Kacey Scappa) to operate. One operated his head and body, one did his arms, one for his mouth and lip-sync, and another 2 for the rest of his facial movements. His face was incredibly expressive, with dual axis ears, eyes up/down. eyes side/side, and blinks, 2-axis eyebrows, nose up/down, 2 axis jaw, smile, and 4 axis lip movement. Due to Gus's small size, many of the servos needed to provide his animatronic functions are mounted externally, with the cables running through spring housings on their way up to his head.

Gus, with his lovable, wise-cracking personality, gained much popularity with Pennsylvanians; however, the Pennsylvania Lottery does not offer plush replicas of Gus for sale despite customer requests because it believes that such a toy would advertise the lottery (a game which is restricted to adult play) to children.

Gus has also appeared dressed in both Philadelphia Eagles and Pittsburgh Steelers uniforms with other similarly uniformed men in a licensed co-branding with those two National Football League teams, as certain instant games are branded for those teams.

On February 22, 2012, the Pennsylvania Lottery announced that the campaign with Gus would be discontinued, so they could focus on a new campaign explaining how the PA Lottery benefits older Pennsylvanians, but after a nearly four-year hiatus, he returned on November 1, 2015 onwards.

However, Gus's heralded "return" was in an updated computer digital image (CGI) with the conversion costing $68,700 in addition to an almost $400,000 advertising campaign. The decision to convert the popular character to pure CGI was initially somewhat controversial, prompting petitions and social media pages to be created to save Gus from transforming from a real-life creation to one some believed would have no real interplay with the other on-camera actors.

== See also ==
- Punxsutawney Phil
