= Scots dialect =

Scots dialect can refer to:

- Scottish English, the varieties of the English language spoken in Scotland
- The Scots language or one of the dialects therein
  - Scots-language dialects
  - Doric dialect (Scotland), the dialect of North Eastern Scotland
