= Le Balzac =

Movie theater in Paris

Coordinates: 48.8728804°N 2.2997201°E

Facade of Le Balzac

Le Balzac is a movie theater in Paris, France. It features an art deco main auditorium, and is known for its independent arthouse programming.

== History ==
Le Balzac was opened in 1935 with a screening of the film The Wedding Night, directed by King Vidor. Initially, Le Balzac specialized in major Hollywood productions. After World War II, Le Balzac turned its focus to French cinema and helped the emergence of French directors such as René Clément and Jacques Tati, before focusing on international arthouse productions. In 2014 Jean-Jacques Schpoliansky, the long-time director of Le Balzac, described his vision for Le Balzac as "like a literary salon, where people can discuss and imagine changes in society".
