= Staten Island Chuck =

Groundhog in Staten Island Zoo, New York

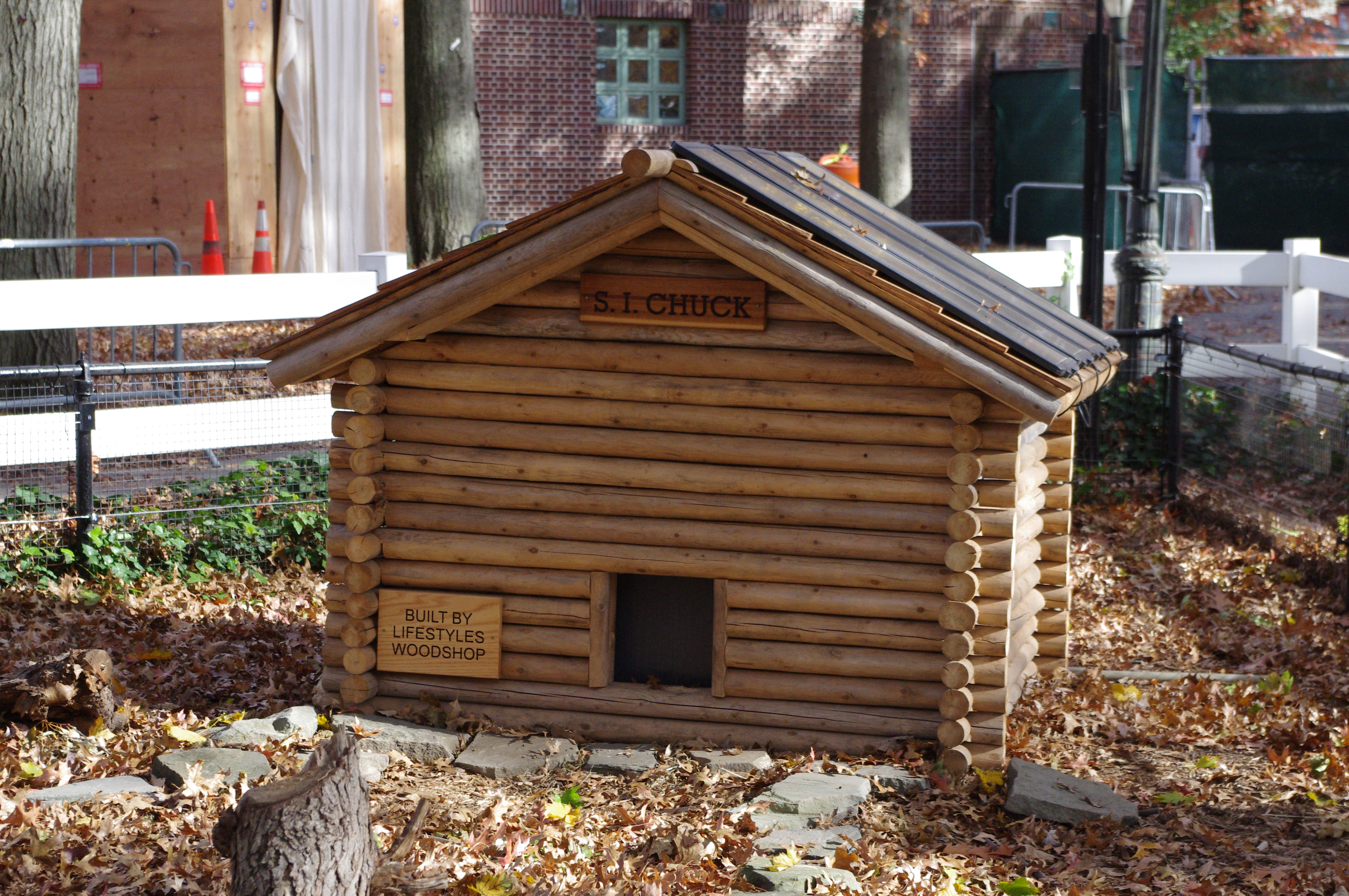
Staten Island Chuck's 2010 house

Staten Island Chuck, also referred to more formally as Charles G. Hogg, is a groundhog who resides in the Staten Island Zoo in Staten Island, New York City. He serves as the official groundhog meteorologist of New York City, who predicts the duration of winter each February 2 on Groundhog Day. The tradition dates back to 1981. He makes the prediction based on whether or not he sees his shadow during the ceremony between 7:00 a.m. and 7:30 a.m. on Groundhog Day. The ceremony at the zoo is sometimes attended and officiated by the Mayor of New York City. Chuck's prediction for 2026 was 6 more weeks of winter, the same prediction made by Punxsutawney Phil.

== Notable moments ==
Staten Island Chuck bit New York City Mayor Michael Bloomberg in 2009. Over his 12 years as mayor, Bloomberg attended 7 of 12 ceremonies.

Chuck was later replaced by his granddaughter, Charlotte, for the first Groundhog Day ceremony held during the mayoralty of Bill de Blasio. During that ceremony held on February 2, 2014, de Blasio dropped Charlotte onto the ground in front of "shocked schoolchildren". Charlotte died on February 9, 2014, although the Staten Island Zoo did not make this fact public until several months later. According to the New York Post, a necropsy attributed Charlotte's death to "acute internal injuries" consistent with a fall. Despite accusations of a coverup and reports that de Blasio had killed the groundhog, the zoo initially claimed that the animal died of natural causes, and later took the position that it was "unlikely" that Charlotte's death was caused by the fall.

Chuck's daughter, Charlotte Jr., served as a stand-in for him at Groundhog Day 2015. On February 2, 2015, this female "Staten Island Chuck" walked out of a hutch that an elevator had lifted onto the stage of a portable Plexiglas habitat, while de Blasio watched from six feet (1.8 m) away. De Blasio did not attend the 2016 ceremonies, as he was in Iowa campaigning for Hillary Clinton's Presidential bid; Lieutenant Governor of New York Kathy Hochul officiated the groundhog ceremony in de Blasio's stead. He likewise did not attend the ceremony from 2017 to 2019, and in 2020 confirmed that he has no plans to ever return to the Groundhog Day Ceremony at the Staten Island Zoo: "I tried it, it didn't end well, I won't be back," de Blasio said.

In 2017, Staten Island Chuck made his publication debut in the children's book Groundhog Chuck Builds a Weather Station. Authored by known animal lover and supporter of the outdoors, Staten Island's Deputy Borough President Ed Burke, the book follows Chuck and his zoo friends on an adventure to ensure the right weather forecast is always made.

== Past predictions ==
The Staten Island Zoo has claimed that Chuck correctly predicted the duration of winter 26 out of 32 years as of 2013, an 82% success rate.

In 2025, the National Oceanic and Atmospheric Administration graded Staten Island Chuck as the most accurate animal prognosticator, ranking in first place out of 19 seasonal predictors across the United States; NOAA analysis of 20 years of data from the National Centers for Environmental Information rated Chuck's forecast projections to have an 85% success rate, whereas the more famous Punxsutawney Phil ranked 17 out of 19 with a 35% rate of prediction accuracy.

Early spring is defined as a spring in which the majority of days between Groundhog Day and the March equinox have a high temperature of over 40 °F (4 °C).

Year	Prediction	Agreed with Punxsutawney Phil	Who was right
2026	6 more weeks of winter	Yes	both
2025	Early spring	No	Chuck
2024	Early spring	Yes	both
2023	Early spring	No	Chuck
2022	Early spring	No	Chuck
2021	Early spring	No	Chuck
2020	Early spring	Yes	both
2019	Early spring	Yes	neither
2018	Early spring	No	Chuck
2017	Early spring	No	Chuck
2016	Early spring	Yes	both
2015	Early spring	No	Chuck
2014	6 more weeks of winter	Yes	both
2013	Early spring	Yes	both
2012	Early spring	No	
2011	Early spring	Yes	
2010	Early spring	No	
2009	Early spring	No	
2008	Early spring	No	
