= Shubenacadie, Nova Scotia =

Community in Nova Scotia, Canada

Shubenacadie
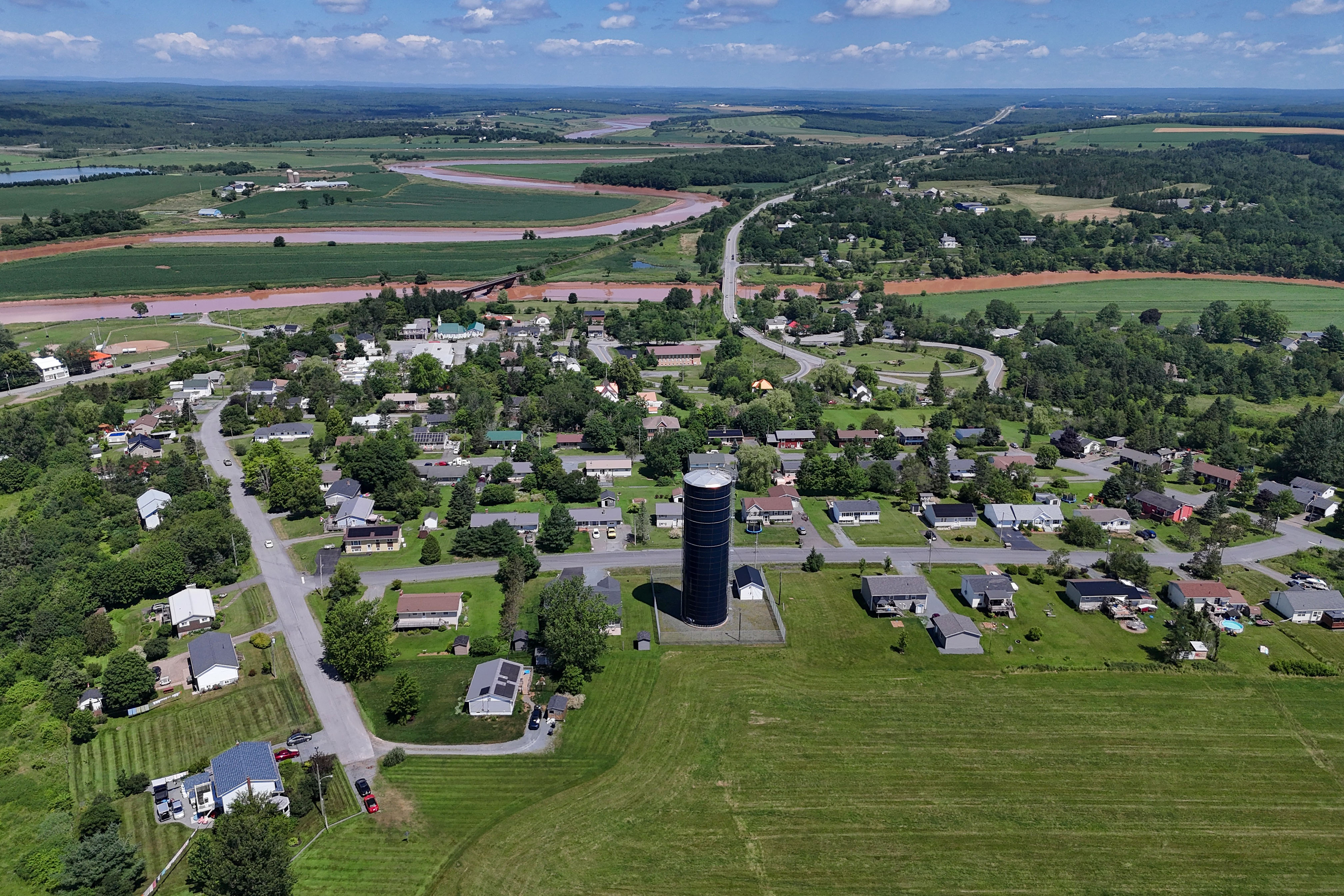
- Aerial view (2025)

- Location in Nova Scotia
- Coordinates: 45°8′23.58″N 63°25′3.17″W
- Country: Canada
- Province: Nova Scotia
- County: Hants County
- Municipality: East Hants Municipality
- Time zone: UTC-4 (AST)
  - Summer (DST): UTC-3 (ADT)
- Canadian Postal Code: B0N
- Area code: 902
- Telephone Exchange: 883
- NTS Map: 011E03
- GNBC Code: CBIQT

Shubenacadie (/ˌʃuːbəˈnækədi/ SHOO-bə-NAK-ə-dee) is an unincorporated community in the Canadian province of Nova Scotia, located in East Hants Municipality in Hants County. As of 2021, the population was 411.

== Etymology ==
"Shubenacadie" derives from the Mi'kmaq name for the area, "Sipekne'katik", meaning "place abounding in groundnuts", or "place where the wapato grows." Historically, the Sipekne'katik region was a large stretch of territory that covered central Nova Scotia.

== History ==
=== Settlement ===
Father Louis-Pierre Thury sought to gather the Mi'kmaq of Peninsular Nova Scotia into a single settlement around Shubenacadie as early as 1699. Not until the Dummer's War between the New France-aligned Wabanaki Confederacy and English New England from 1722–1725, however, did Antoine Gaulin, a Quebec-born missionary, erect a permanent mission at Shubenacadie (adjacent to Snides Lake and close to the former Residential school). He also made seasonal trips to Cape Sable, LaHave, and Mirlegueche.

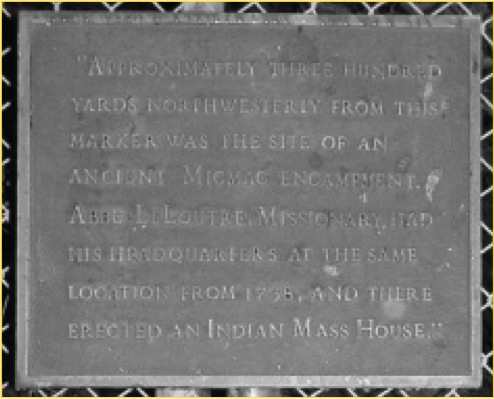
Plaque at Father Le Loutre's Mission, Shubenacadie, Nova Scotia

In 1738, Abbé Jean-Louis Le Loutre arrived in October of that year at Mission Sainte-Anne, having spent the previous winter in Cape Breton learning the Mi'kmaq language with Abbé Pierre Maillard. During Dummer's War and King George's War, Mission Sainte-Anne was a military base as well as a place of worship. The army of Louis Coulon de Villiers passed this way on their march toward the Battle of Grand Pré in 1747, and Mi'kmaq warriors used the site as a staging point for their attacks on Halifax and Dartmouth during Father Le Loutre's War.

=== 1932 bank robbery ===
On 23 August 1932, a botched robbery attempt targeted the Royal Bank of Canada branch in Shubenacadie. The Royal Canadian Mounted Police (RCMP), who had recently replaced the Nova Scotia Police as the provincial police force, were alerted of the plan by Edson Boutilier, one of the robbers. The police provided Boutilier with an unloaded gun and a car and attempted to ambush the robbers, resulting in a shootout that left Boutilier wounded and his brother-in-law Gerald Freckleton dead. The incident sparked significant public criticism of the RCMP's armed presence in the Nova Scotia.

=== Residential school ===
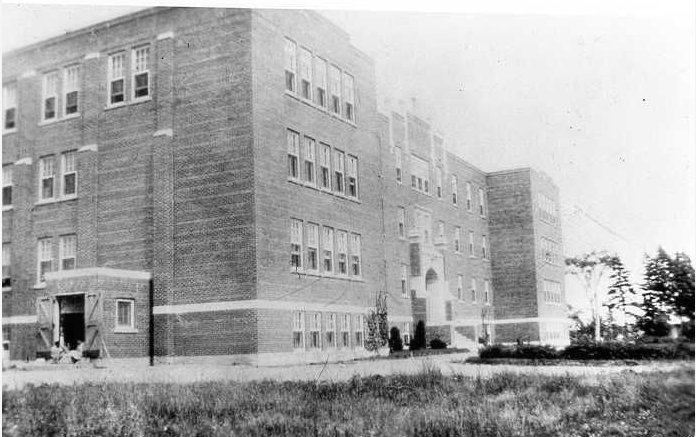
The Shubenacadie Indian Residential School in 1930

Shubenacadie was the location of the Shubenacadie Indian Residential School, a Canadian residential school, that was operated from 1923 to 1967. Over 1,000 children are estimated to have been placed in the institution over 37 years. The school building was destroyed by fire in 1986. The school's site is now occupied by a plastics factory, although a few staff houses remain and the road to the school is still named "Indian School Road".

Nora Bernard, a Mi'kmaq activist, attended the school for five years. Later in life, she was directly responsible for what became the largest class action lawsuit in Canadian history, compensation for an estimated 79,000 former students of the Canadian Indian residential school system. The former Shubenacadie Indian Residential School was designated a national historic site in July 2020.

== Landmarks ==
=== Cenotaph ===
External audio
- "The Case of the Moving Cenotaph". Information Morning. Halifax, N.S.: CBC Radio One.

The Shubenacadie Cenotaph was unveiled in 1921, at the cost of $5,000 raised by the community. The monument was erected to honour the 19 men from Shubenacadie who died in the First World War. In May 2025, the monument was moved to the nearby Royal Canadian Legion property to allow for the expansion of an adjacent parking lot, sparking significant community opposition. East Hants municipal council received a letter from the president of the Shubenacadie Legion, suggesting that the cenotaph could be brought to Legion property if it had to be relocated. Councillors admitted that they misinterpreted the letter as support for moving the cenotaph, and it was later announced that the cenotaph would be moved back to its original location.

=== Shubenacadie Tree ===
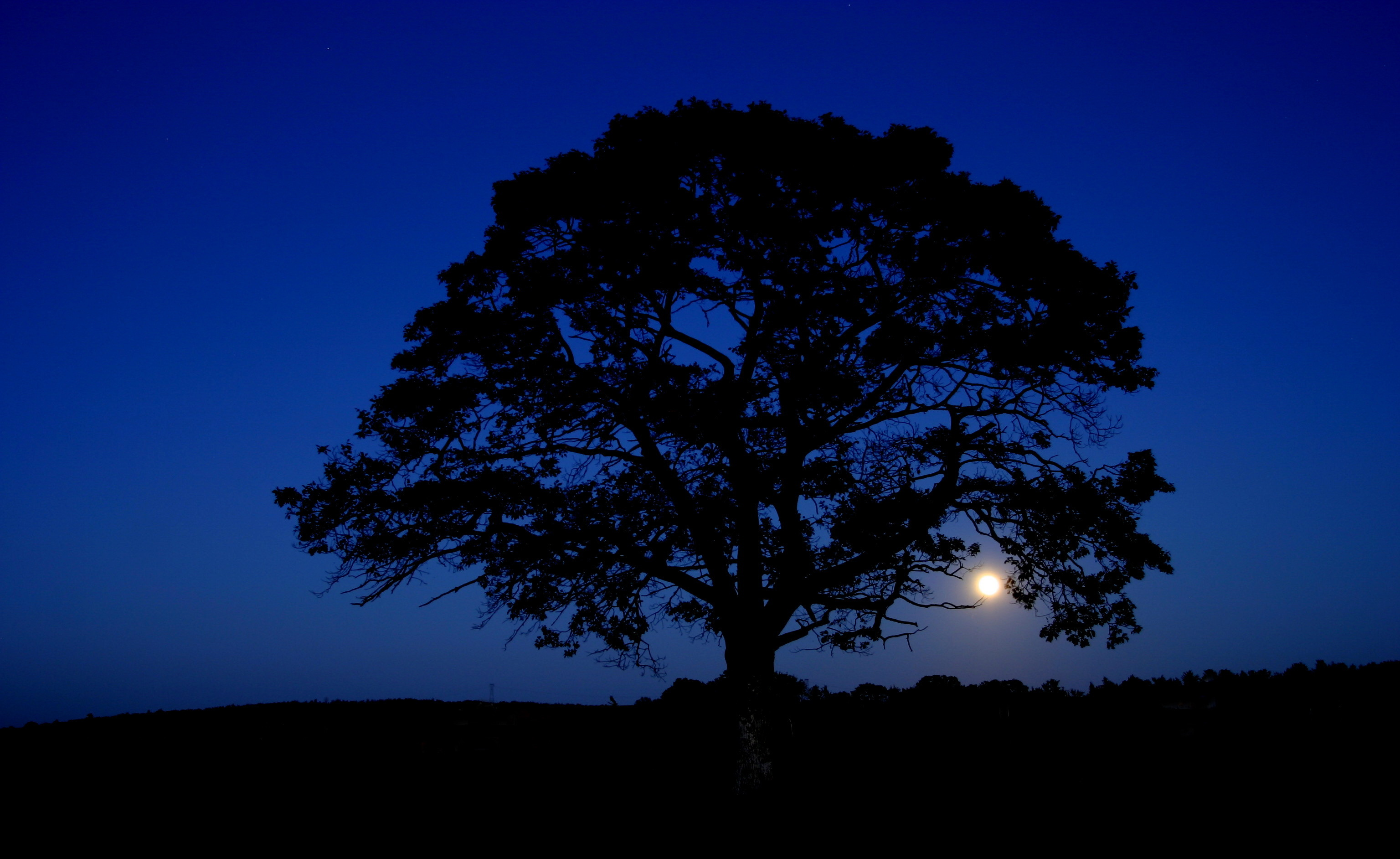
The Shubenacadie Tree in 2004

The Shubenacadie Tree was a 300-year-old red oak tree located near the community of Shubenacadie, destroyed during Hurricane Fiona in 2022. The tree has been referred to as the "most photographed tree in Nova Scotia". After the tree fell, a resident gathered its acorns and grew a total of 24 seedlings with plans to share them with the community. Some wood from the fallen tree was used to make Christmas ornaments and coasters by a local craftsman, who sold them and donated part of the proceeds to disaster relief for the hurricane. Halifax newspaper The Coast published a eulogy for the tree.

=== Tinsmith Museum ===
The Tinsmith Museum is a local history museum located in Shubenacadie. Established by Watson Smith c. 1895 as Watson Smith & Sons Retail Hardware & Tin Shop, the shop produced over 60,000 milk cans before the cans became obsolete around the 1950s. The building opened to the public as a museum in 2003, after being donated to the Municipality of East Hants.

== Demographics ==
=== Shubenacadie part A ===
In the 2021 Census of Population conducted by Statistics Canada, Shubenacadie part A had a population of 401 living in 176 of its 191 total private dwellings, a change of −45.4% from its 2016 population of 735. With a land area of 4 km^{2} (1.5 sq mi), it had a population density of 100.3/km^{2} (259.6/sq mi) in 2021.

=== Shubenacadie part B ===
In the 2021 Census of Population conducted by Statistics Canada, Shubenacadie part B had a population of 10 living in 6 of its 7 total private dwellings, a change of −94.7% from its 2016 population of 187. With a land area of 2.12 km^{2} (0.82 sq mi), it had a population density of 4.7/km^{2} (12.2/sq mi) in 2021.

== Notable residents ==
- Anna Mae Aquash – Mi'kmaq activist
- Clare Gass – military nurse in the First World War
- Shubenacadie Sam – groundhog at the Shubenacadie Wildlife Park that gives predictions on Groundhog Day.
- George Lang – stonemason who built the Halifax Court House and other buildings

== See also ==
- Atlantic Motorsport Park
- Shubenacadie station
- Sipekne'katik First Nation
