= Balzac, Alberta =

Balzac
- Hamlet
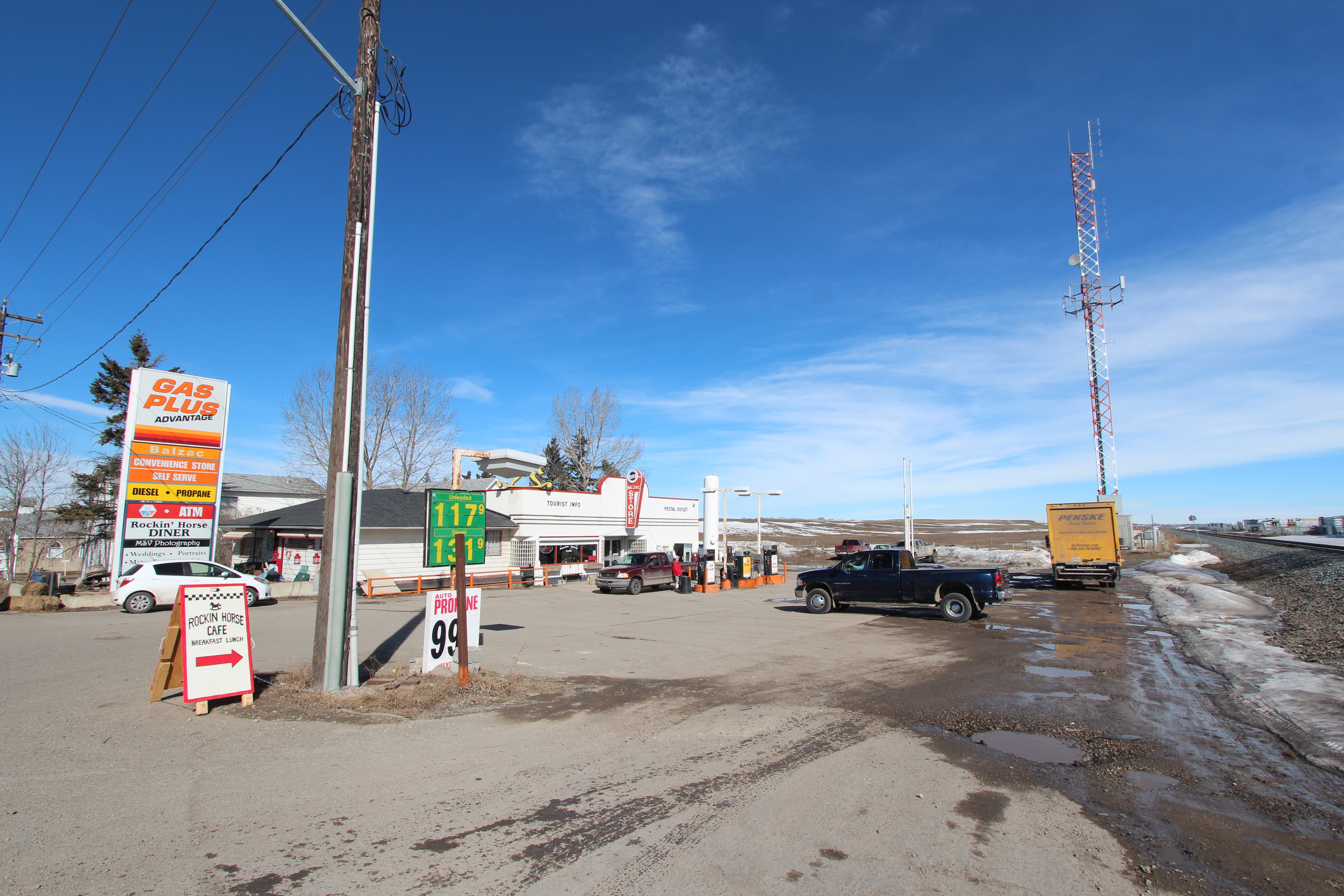

- Location of Balzac in Alberta
- Coordinates: 51.213°N 114.008°W
- Country: Canada
- Province: Alberta
- Census division: No. 6
- Municipal district: Rocky View County

Government
  - Type: Unincorporated
  - Reeve: Greg Boehlke
  - Governing body: Rocky View County Council: Jerry Arshinoff; Rolly Ashdown; Margaret Bahcheli; Greg Boehlke; Liz Breakey; Lois Habberfield; Bruce Kendall; Eric Lowther; Earl Solberg
- Elevation: 1,080 m (3,540 ft)

Population (2006)
  - Total: 1
- Time zone: UTC−06:00 (Alberta Time)

Balzac is a hamlet in Rocky View County, which is in the Calgary Metropolitan Region of the Canadian province of Alberta. It is surrounded by Balzac East, an employment area to the east, and Balzac West, a planned residential community to the west. The hamlet is located immediately west of Queen Elizabeth II Highway (Highway 2), at the intersection with Highway 566, 24 km (15 mi) north of Calgary city centre and 12 km (7.5 mi) south of Airdrie.

The hamlet is located in census division No. 6 and in the Alberta federal electoral district of Banff—Airdrie (formerly in the federal electoral district of Wild Rose).

As of July 31, 2007, Balzac is immediately adjacent to Calgary's northern city limits. Balzac is also directly west of the CrossIron Mills shopping mall.

== History ==
A Canadian Pacific Railway station began operating at Balzac in 1910. It was named by William Cornelius Van Horne, then president of the Canadian Pacific Railway, after one of his favourite authors, Honoré de Balzac (1799–1850) a noted French novelist. The post office here was opened on April 1, 1912 under the name "Beddington" and was changed on July 1, 1925. The first warehouse was built in 1916, mostly for coal. Canadian Senator and senate reform advocate Bert Brown hails from Balzac.

== Geography ==
The Hamlet of Balzac comprises just over four quarter sections of land on the west side of Highway 2 (the Queen Elizabeth II Highway), mostly north of Highway 566. The hamlet bisected by a Canadian Pacific Kansas City rail line on its east side parallel to Highway 2.

The hamlet is part of the larger Balzac West area, which is bounded by Highway 2 to the east, the City of Airdrie to the north, Range Road 13 to the west, and the City of Calgary to the south. The Balzac West area is predominantly planned for residential development between Highway 566 to the south and the City of Airdrie to the north with non-residential uses planned for the east along Highway 2.

Across Highway 2 from the hamlet is Balzac East, which is 69 quarter sections of existing and planned employment and country residential land uses. Balzac East borders the City of Airdrie to the northwest and the City of Calgary to the south.

== Demographics ==
The population of Balzac according to the 2006 municipal census conducted by Rocky View County is 1.

== Economy ==
- Although not officially located within Balzac, the hamlet is immediately adjacent to the CrossIron Mills shopping centre, which is the largest single-level mall in Alberta. The business park surrounding the mall, which opened in 2009, saw the addition of a horse-racing track and casino in 2015, and is earmarked for an equestrian college campus and other businesses. The mall and surrounding businesses are officially within the Rocky View County, but the mall and business park is often referred to as being in Balzac because of its proximity to the hamlet.
- In early 2009, Wal-mart announced plans to spend CA$115 million ($104.4 US million) to build a 400,000-square-foot (37,000 m^{2}) distribution centre in the business park east of Balzac. The facility opened in late 2010 and acts as a distribution hub for fresh food in Western Canada.
- In late 2017 Amazon agreed to locate a 600,000-square-foot (56,000 m^{2}) distribution centre. The facility is estimated to create 750 permanent jobs. According to Amazon's director of Canadian operations, Glenn Sommerville the location's proximity of the Calgary International Airport is optimal for faster shipping.
- The company Enterra has secured $30M to establish a breeding facility of insects such as the soldier black fly as a source for high protein animal feed. The facility will employ 30 staff and be operational in 2019.
- New Horizon Mall

== Media ==
Due to its close proximity to both Calgary and Airdrie, Balzac receives most media (television, radio, newspapers) from those two cities.

Balzac Billy, a Groundhog Day prognosticator, resides in the community.

== See also ==
- List of communities in Alberta
- List of hamlets in Alberta
