= Balzac Billy =

Groundhog Day groundhog in Alberta, Canada

Balzac Billy is the Prairie Prognosticator, a groundhog-costumed mascot who prognosticates weather on Groundhog Day. He lives in Balzac, Alberta, 8 km north of Calgary, Alberta, Canada. According to the legend of Groundhog Day, the groundhog's behavior is a way of forecasting the weather. If the groundhog sees his shadow, it means that winter will continue for six more weeks.

Balzac Billy was created by Calgary radio station CFAC's program director Jim Kunkel in the late 1970s. Kunkel sat down with three of CFAC's radio announcers (Paul Dunphy, Jimmy Hughes and Robin Ingram) to come up with a western groundhog. After trying out a few names Kunkel came up with Balzac Billy, and the prairie prognosticator was born. Dunphy produced and Hughes voiced the first Balzac Billy "live at the scene" radio hits to be played on CFAC's Ned Corrigall morning show (two versions were produced, one for the mascot seeing his shadow and one for a cloudy day). Balzac Billy (representing a Richardson Ground Squirrel) was added because groundhogs are not native to Southern Alberta, and the mascot is a favourite local prognosticator on Groundhog Day.

In 2019 and 2025, Balzac Billy predicted an early spring. In 2023, 2024, and 2026 the mascot predicted six more weeks of winter.
