= Wiarton Willie =

Groundhog in Ontario, Canada, that celebrates Groundhog Day

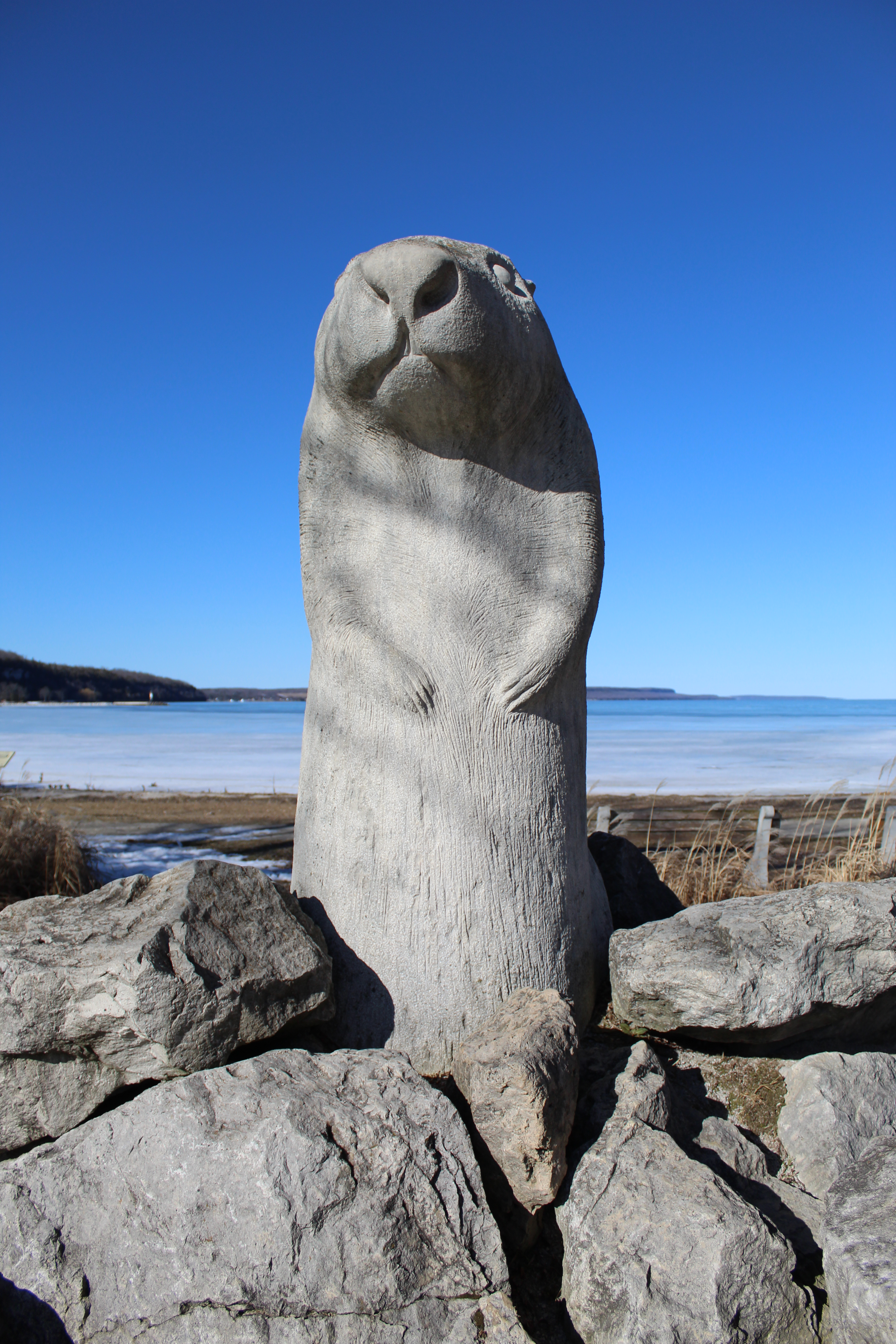
A monument to Wiarton Willie in Bluewater Park

Wiarton Willie was the name given to a Canadian groundhog who lives in the community of Wiarton in Bruce County, Ontario. Every February 2, on Groundhog Day, Willie takes part in the local Wiarton Willie Festival. His role is to predict whether there will be an early spring. Although the original Wiarton Willie died in 1999, the Wiarton Groundhog Day celebrations continue each year with a successor of the original Willie (except in 1999 and 2021 where, due to the previous Willies' deaths, no groundhog was used), and each successor is also referred to as Wiarton Willie.

Groundhog Day, featuring Wiarton Willie, is a popular annual festival in Wiarton and is similar to events in other locations in North America. A midwinter celebration involving an animal with predictive powers was an element of Celtic culture. The link between weather prediction and the day is said to have been inspired by an old Scottish couplet: "If Candlemas Day is bright and clear/ There'll be two winters in the year."

== History ==
The story of Wiarton Willie dates back to 1956. A Wiarton resident named Mac McKenzie wanted to showcase his childhood home to his many friends, so he sent out invitations for a "Groundhog Day" gathering. One of these invitations fell into the hands of a Toronto Star reporter. The reporter travelled to Wiarton looking for the Groundhog Day event. None of the townspeople knew about a festival, but one suggested he check at the Arlington Hotel, the local watering hole. There the reporter found McKenzie and his friends partying and was invited to join them. The next day, the reporter lamented to McKenzie that he needed some kind of story to take back to justify his expenses. So McKenzie grabbed his wife's fur hat, which had a large button on the front, went out to the parking lot, dug a burrow in the snow and pronounced a prognostication (which no one remembers). The picture of Mac and the hat ran in the February 3, 1956 edition of the Toronto Star. A year later, about 50 people arrived for the festival. Half were reporters from various media, including the CBC and Canadian Press. Seizing on the opportunity, McKenzie invented a festival that has been added to over the years.

Wiarton Willie himself is a more recent addition to the festivities. In the early years, prognostication was provided by the "mythical" trio of groundhogs Grundoon, Muldoon and Sand Dune. Willie appeared on the scene in the 1980s. Wiarton Willie's predictive powers are attributed (by his followers) to his situation on the 45th parallel, exactly halfway between the Equator and the North Pole. He is claimed locally to be accurate in his prognostications around 90% of the time; scientists have estimated Willie's accuracy at 25%.

=== Death and successors ===
The original Wiarton Willie lived to the advanced age of 22, and was found dead only two days before Groundhog Day in 1999. The organizers were unable to find a replacement, and instead marked Groundhog Day by revealing "Willie" in a coffin. He had been dressed in a tuxedo, had coins over his eyes, and a carrot between his paws. The real Willie had in fact decomposed, and the body in the coffin was that of an older, stuffed groundhog. The Associated Press was obliged to issue a retraction on its wires.

Wiarton Willie's keepers groom understudies, nicknamed "Wee Willie" during the elder groundhog's lifetime, to eventually replace the reigning Wiarton Willie when they die. Wiarton Willies have typically had lifespans longer than the 4–9 years of a typical groundhog, and thus other groundhogs may have served in the role unreported. Wiarton Willie II was reported as deceased on July 11, 2006, after fighting an infection for the previous month.

On September 15, 2017, Wiarton Willie III died at 13. Two-year-old Wee Willie became Wiarton Willie IV on September 30, 2017, coinciding with a memorial service for the old Willie. Wiarton Willie IV died in 2020, leading to the 2021 prediction being made without the presence of a groundhog. Wiarton Willie IV's death was not publicly announced until November 2021. Wiarton Willie V was introduced at the 2022 Groundhog Day celebration; he is the first brown groundhog to assume the position. On March 10, 2026, it was announced that Wiarton Willie V had died, and that a search for a new successor would start "in the coming days".

=== Death of cubs controversy ===
In May 2003, two of Wiarton Willie II's Wee Willies disappeared; three months later, they were found dead in the burrow where they resided with Willie. Because groundhogs are known to be territorial animals, Willie was suspected of killing the two, an allegation that was never proven. Francesca Dobbyn, who looked after the groundhogs, informed her immediate supervisor who chose not to inform the Wiarton city council of the incident, fearing bad publicity; the council agreed to allow Dobbyn to keep her job despite the scandal.

== Past predictions ==
2026	"Early spring"
2025	"Early spring"
2024	"Early spring"
2023	"Early spring"
2022	"Early spring"
2021	"Early spring"
2020	"Early spring"
2019	"Early spring"
2018	"Long winter"
2017	"Early spring"
2016	"Long winter"
2015	"Early spring"
2014	"Long winter"
2013	"Early spring"
2012	"Early spring"
2011	"Early spring"
2010	"Long winter"
2009	"Long winter"
2008	"Early spring"
2007	"Early spring"
2006	"Early spring"
2005	"Early spring"
2004	"Long winter"
2003	"Early spring"
2002	"Early spring"
2001	"Early spring"
2000	"Long winter"
1999	"Early spring"

== Groundhog Day show ==
Groundhog Day in Wiarton is a major celebration, with dances, parades, ice hockey tournaments, curling bonspiels, pancake breakfasts, darts and snooker tournaments, sleigh rides, a Monte Carlo Night and a fish fry. Around 10,000 people are said to attend. It has been called "one [of] the most popular events in Ontario" and has twice been named "the World's Greatest Event" by Seattle's Festivals.com.
