= Simon Donato =

Canadian scientist (born 1976)

Simon Vincent Donato (born 1976) is a Canadian geologist, ultra-endurance athlete, and entrepreneur. He produced and co-starred in the TV show Boundless, and is the founder of Adventure Science and co-founder of Stoked Oats.

== Early life and education ==
Donato was born in Winnipeg, Manitoba, and grew up in London, Ontario, where he attended Oakridge Secondary School and earned a bachelor's degree in anthropology and a master's degree in geology from the University of Western Ontario; he also studied paleontology and wildlife biology. In 2008 he completed a PhD in geology at McMaster University. In high school, he opened a mountain biking center behind his house in London, and after working as a carpenter, he started a bike courier business in 1990. In university he became an ultra-marathoner and founded the Canadian Adventure Racing Association.

== Career ==
After graduation Donato began work as a geologist for Imperial Oil in Calgary, where he worked until summer 2012.

In 2008, he founded Adventure Science. The first project was a week-long foot search by a team of extreme athletes in July 2008 on the California–Nevada border for Steve Fossett, who had gone missing on a solo flight on September 3, 2007. Subsequent projects have included studying the relationship between ultra-running and muscle damage, searching for undiscovered archaeological ruins in the Middle East, and anti-poaching projects in Kenya.

Donato contracted with Josh and Jordan Eady of Eady Brothers Productions, whom he knew from Western Ontario, to produce the documentary Go Death Racer about his participation with Paul Trebilcock (whom he knew from McMaster) in the 2010 Canadian Death Race. Based on this and with the same team, he launched the television series Boundless, which followed Donato and Trebilcock as they traveled the globe competing in ultra-endurance races, ranging from stand-up paddle boarding to running across the Sahara desert. The show ran for three seasons from February 2013.

In 2017, Donato published The Boundless Life: 13 Lessons Learned the Hard Way.

In 2011, he co-founded Stoked Oats Ltd., which makes high-protein gluten-free oatmeal.

With his wife, Donato runs Think Like a Mountain, a conservation non-profit. He is a Fellow International of the Explorers Club and a member of the College of Fellows of the Royal Canadian Geographical Society.

== Results ==
2012: 1st place and set a course record in the Iron-Legs 50 miler and relay (2-man team); 2nd place in the 250 km Sahara Race; 1st place in the Fire and Ice Ultra marathon in Iceland; 6th place in the Ancient Khmer Path Ultra stage race, 230 km; 12th place in the 6 Hours of Frog Hollow MTB Enduro bike race.

2011: 1st place in the K-100 relay (coed); 1st place in the Wild Hare 50 miler; 2nd place in the Iron-Legs 50 miler.

2010: 43rd (first ultra) in the Copper Canyon 50 miler; 2nd in men's and 4th overall in the Canadian Death Race; 1st place in the Cactus Rose 50 miler; 3rd place in the 25 km Rocky Racoon race.

== Personal life ==
Donato is married to Chanelle Mayer.
