= Bruce Peninsula Multisport Race =

- Date: Annually on 2nd Saturday in August
- Location: Wiarton, Canada
- Event type: Multisport race
- Distance: 25km & 13km
- Beneficiary: RideSmart youth bicycle skills training
- Established: 2011
- Organizer: Peninsula Adventure Sports Association
- Website: brucepeninsulamultisportrace.ca

The Bruce Peninsula Multisport Race is a multisport race with no navigational component, held on the Bruce Peninsula since 2011:. Racers follow a marked course on a combination of private and public land and race in multiple stages of paddling, mountain biking and trail running. The exact routing of the course is announced only to the racers on the morning of the race, and is typically five stages long and approximately 100 kilometres (62 mi) in length. The long course can be done solo, in teams of two, or as a relay race however has not been offered since 2023. There is also a shorter distance which is typically 25 kilometres (16 mi) in length, plus a sprint distance, as well as a children's race that takes place concurrent with the full distance. In 2024 the sprint distance was added and the long course discontinued. The event takes place annually on the second weekend in August and is based out of Wiarton, in Ontario, Canada.

The race is a qualifying stop on Adventure Racing Ontario's points series, which is a schedule of team-based adventure sport events taking place in the province of Ontario. The proceeds of the race benefit the non-profit Peninsula Adventure Sports Association and RideSmart youth bicycle skills training.

The 2020 race was canceled by organizers due to the COVID-19 pandemic with registrants given their choice of a credit for a future event or a partial refund. The race was also featured on the final episode of season 3 of the TV show Boundless.

Past Subaru Long Course Winners (long distance paddle-bike-run)

Year	Male Solo Winner	Female Solo Winner	Tandem Team Winner	Relay Team Winner
2011	Jason Urckfitz	Angela Schnuerch	none	Van Den Bosch/Kaandorp
2012	Bob Miller	Ursula Tracz	St. John/MacGregor	Rock & Road Cycle
2013	Kyle Peter	Una Hall	Raymond/Schwass	Team Linde
2014	Peter Beisel	Deb Val	MacGregor/Thompson	Storm Racing/Canadian Outback
2015	William Logie	Shannon Miller	Boundless 2	Armed and Dangerous
2016	William Logie	Joan Matthews	Black Swan Racing	Storm Racing
2017	Ryan Blake	Patricia Clune	Black Swan Racing	TBA Reloaded
2018	Jason Urckfitz	Karine Corbeil	Black Swan Racing	Sudbury Sulpher Kings
2019	Scott Ford	Shannon Miller	Team Twins	Bruce Ski Club
2020	event canceled	event canceled	event canceled	event canceled
2021	Chad Spence	Una Hall	Attack From Above	Bruce Ski Club
2022	Mitch Addison	Una Hall	Spare Parts	Bruce Ski Club
2023	Sean Roper	Una Hall	Spare Parts	Bruce Ski Club

Past Suntrail Course Winners (short distance paddle-bike-run)

Year	Male Winner	Female Winner	Tandem Team Winner	Relay Team Winner
2011	Scott Thomson	Kylie Innes	Klerks/Rovers	n/a
2012	None*	None*	None*	n/a
2013	Peter Beisel	Logan Hong	Sisters United	n/a
2014	Mark Shouldice	Claudette McKnight	EAG Crossfit	n/a
2015	Mark Shouldice	Claudette McKnight	Quicklaces	n/a
2016	Peter Beisel	Claudette McKnight	Sweet Nothins	n/a
2017	Rob Sealey	Lee-ann Dungate	Quicklaces	n/a
2018	Dylan Beck	Shannon Bentley	Quicklaces	n/a
2019	Chris Hodgkinson	Jamie Arthur	3kidslater	n/a
2020	event canceled	event canceled	event canceled	event canceled
2021	Cohen Martin	Lindsay Sutherland	Duntroon Highlands	n/a
2022	Cohen Martin	Lindsay Sutherland	Mom Strong	n/a
2023	Andrew Jeffrey	Jamie Arthur	Scrambled Legs & Achin'	n/a
2024	Jakob Van Dorp	Lindsay Sutherland	G & M	n/a
2025	Jakob Van Dorp	Jolie McKnight	The Little Guys	The Kindrees

*abandoned due to extreme weather

Past Paddle-Duathlon Winners (short distance paddle-bike-paddle)

Year	Male Winner	Female Winner	Team of 2 Winner
2016	Mark Shouldice	Caroline Wolf	n/a
2017	Mark Shouldice	Caroline Wolf	Killer Llama and Lanky Lass
2018	Mark Shouldice	Penny Brown	The Breakfast Club
2019	Mark Shouldice	Amanda Wong	The JB's

Past Run-Duathlon Winners (short distance run-bike-run)

Year	Male Winner	Female Winner
2013	Greg Nicol	Christine Scott
2014	David Collie	Bethany Kuntz
2015	Steven Nadjiwon	Rose Nadjiwon
2016	none	Kate Manwell
2017	Dan Hladil	Kate Manwell
2018	Dan Hladil	Caitlin Port
2019	Finn Dodgson	Kate Manwell
2020	event canceled	event canceled
2021	Steve MacGregor	Anne McCutcheon
2022	Spencer Summerfield	Dawn Meikle
2023	Chris Reid	Linda Groen
2024	Spencer Summerfield	Tamara Schwass
2025	Andrew MacKinnon	Gabrielle MacKinnon

Past Subaru Sprint Winners (sprint distance paddle-bike-run)

Year	Male Winner	Female Winner	Family Team Winner	Tandem Team Winner
2024	Mark Shouldice	Penny Brown	Hodge Podge	Marisa & Paul
2025	Mark Shouldice	Sandra Stewart	Hodge Podge	Oar-dinary Legends

The fastest completion of the short distance (solo or team) is 1h 28min 2sec recorded by Steven Nadjiwon in 2015, the fastest sprint distance (solo or team) is 55min and 34sec recorded by Mark Shouldice in 2024, and the fastest completion of the full distance (solo or team) is 5h 45min 12sec recorded in 2012 by Bob Miller, known from Team Canada Adventure on World's Toughest Race.
