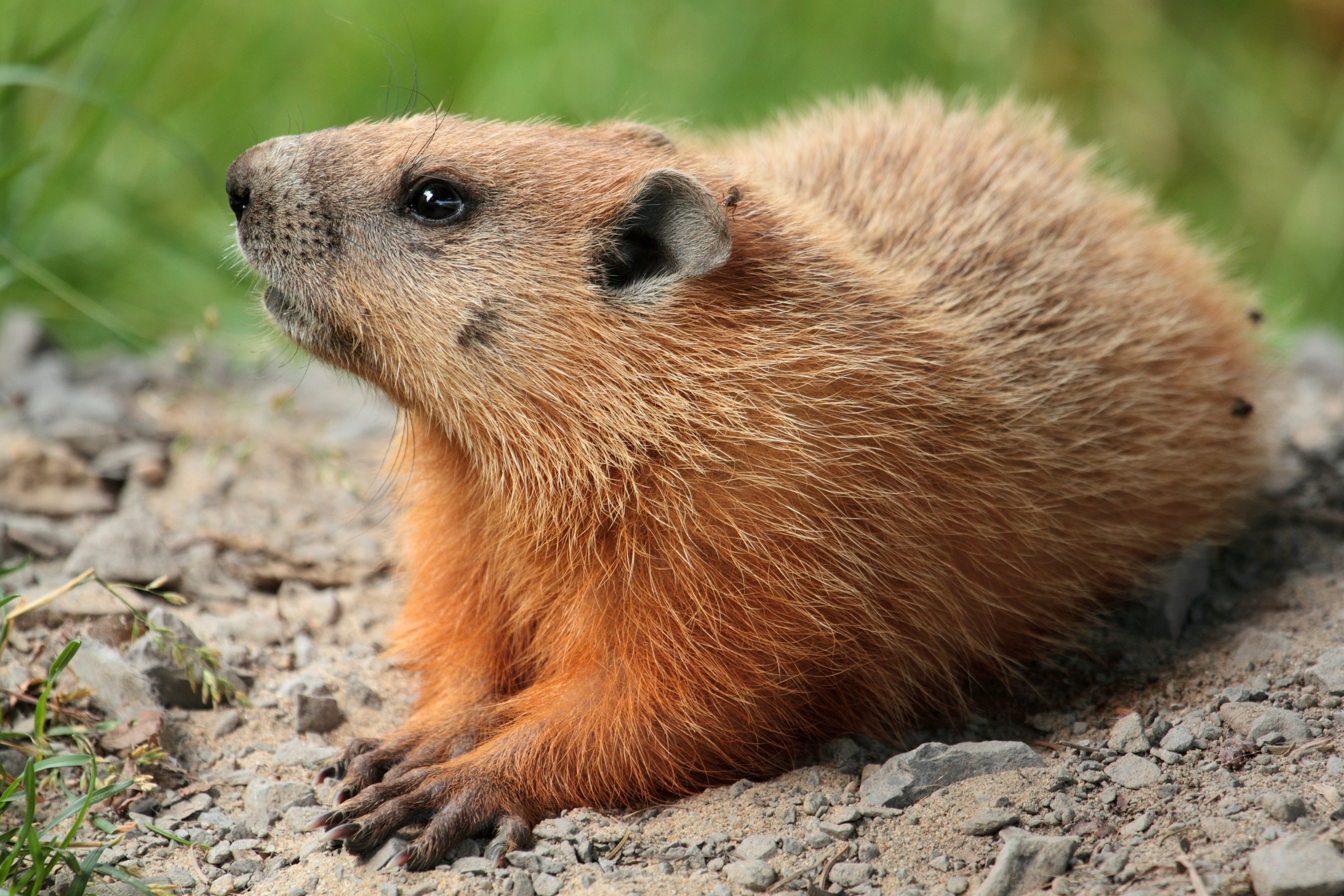
- Groundhog at Laval University campus, Quebec City, Canada

Conservation status
- Least Concern (IUCN 3.1)

Scientific classification
- Kingdom: Animalia
- Phylum: Chordata
- Class: Mammalia
- Order: Rodentia
- Family: Sciuridae
- Genus: Marmota
- Species: M. monax

Binomial name
- Marmota monax (Linnaeus, 1758)

Subspecies
- M. m. monax Linnaeus, 1758; M. m. canadensis Erxleben, 1777; M. m. ignava Bangs, 1899; M. m. rufescens A. H. Howell, 1914
- Groundhog range in North America

Synonyms
- Mus monax Linnaeus, 1758; Arctomys monax (Linnaeus, 1758)

= Groundhog =

Species of rodent

The groundhog (Marmota monax), also known as the woodchuck, is a rodent of the family Sciuridae, belonging to the group of large ground squirrels known as marmots. A lowland creature of North America, it is found through much of the Eastern United States, across Canada and into Alaska. It was given its scientific name as Mus monax by Carl Linnaeus in 1758, based on a description of the animal by George Edwards, published in 1743.

The groundhog, being a lowland animal, is exceptional among marmots. Other marmots, such as the yellow-bellied and hoary marmots, live in rocky and mountainous areas. Groundhogs are considered one of the most solitary of marmot species. They live in aggregations, and their social organization and long-term pair bonds varies across populations. The groundhog's male and female interactions are usually limited to the mating season and copulation. However, certain populations of groundhogs have been observed to form long-term adult male-female association throughout the year, and often from year to year.

The groundhog is an important contributor to the maintenance of healthy soil in woodlands and plains; as such, the species is considered a crucial habitat engineer. The groundhog is an extremely intelligent animal, forming complex social networks and kinship with its young; it is capable of understanding social behavior, communicating threats through whistling, and working cooperatively to accomplish tasks such as burrowing.

== Etymology ==
Common names for the groundhog include chuck, wood-chuck, groundpig, whistle-pig, whistler, thickwood badger, Canada marmot, monax, moonack, weenusk, red monk, land beaver and, among French Canadians in eastern Canada, siffleux. The name "thickwood badger" was given in the Northwest to distinguish the animal from the prairie badger. Monax (Móonack) is an Algonquian name of the woodchuck, which means "digger" (cf. Lenape monachgeu). Young groundhogs may be called chucklings.

The etymology of the name woodchuck is not related to wood nor any sense of chucking. It stems from an Algonquian (possibly Narragansett) name for the animal, wuchak. The similarity between the words has led to the popular tongue-twister:

How much wood would a woodchuck chuck

if a woodchuck could chuck wood?

A woodchuck would chuck all the wood he could

if a woodchuck could chuck wood!

== Description ==
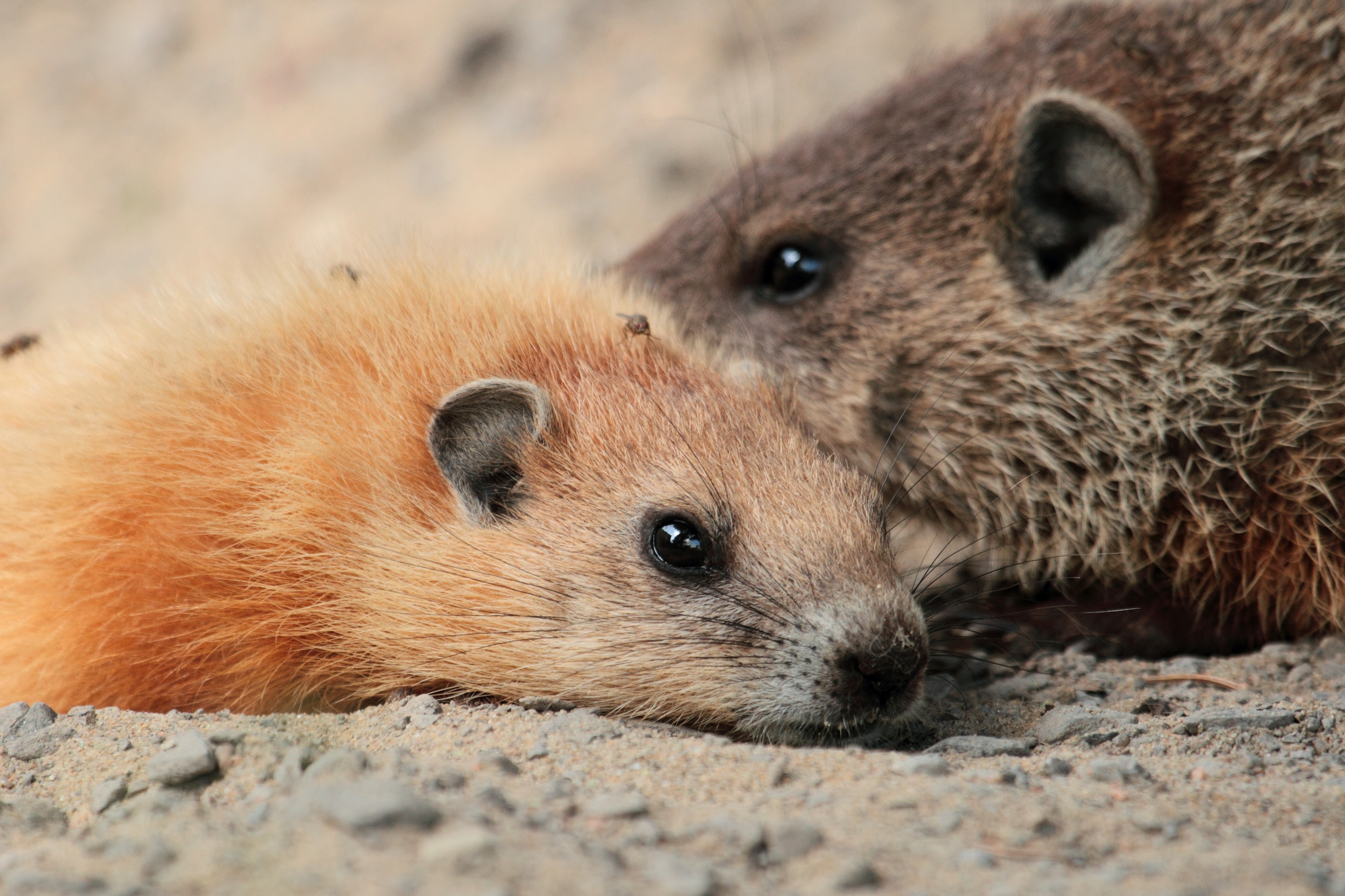
Baby groundhog with its mother

The groundhog is the largest sciurid in its geographical range, excluding its presence in British Columbia where its range may be comparable to that of its somewhat larger cousin, the hoary marmot. Adults may measure from 41.8 to 68.5 cm (16 7/16 to 26 15/16 in) in total length, including a tail of 9.5 to 18.7 cm (3 3/4 to 7 3/8 in). Weights of adult groundhogs typically fall between 2 and 6.3 kg (4 lb 7 oz and 13 lb 14 oz).

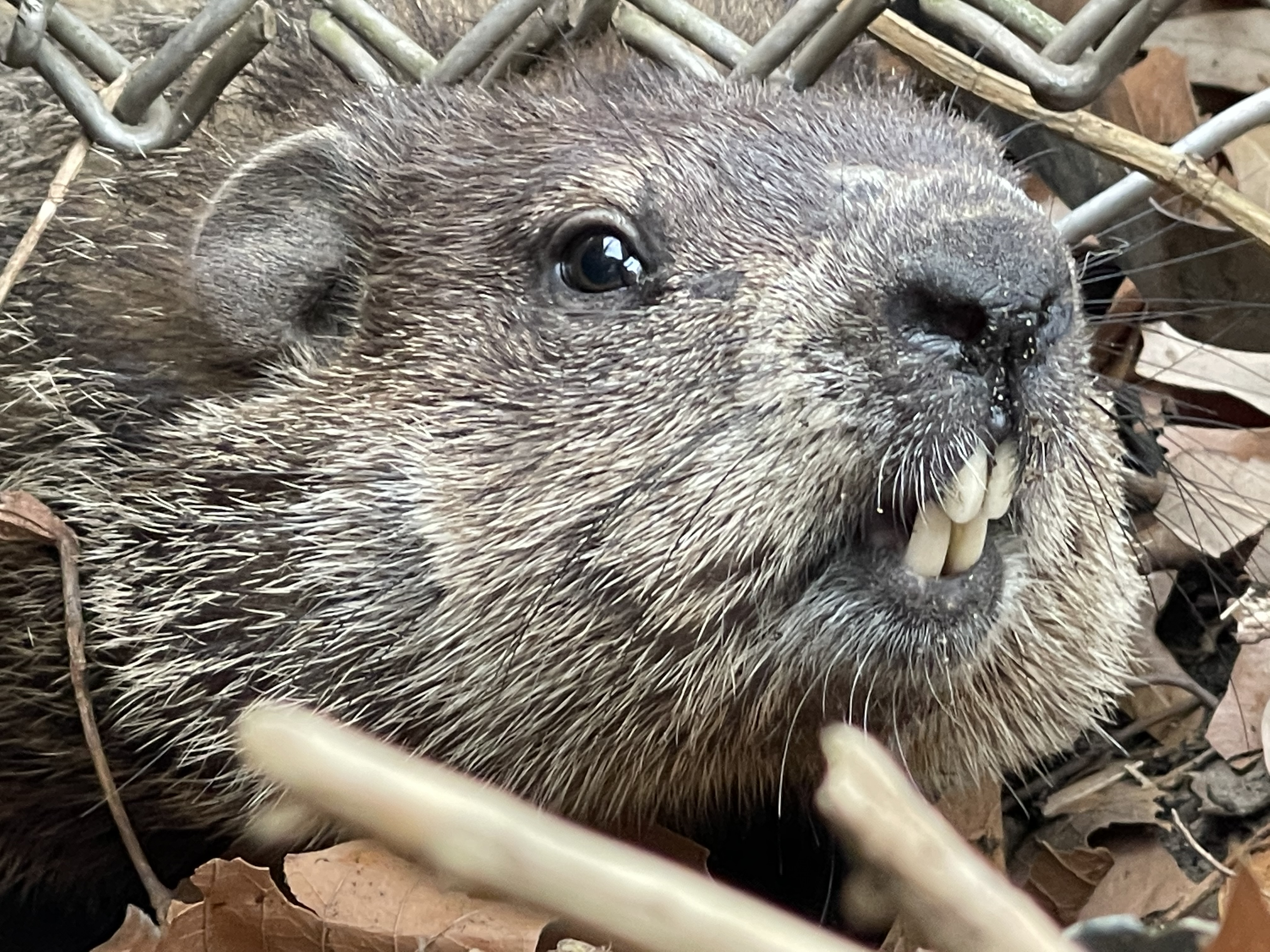
Groundhog displaying its incisors

Male groundhogs are slightly larger than females on average and, like all marmots, they are considerably heavier during autumn (when engaged in autumn hyperphagia) than when they emerge from hibernation in spring. Adult males average year-around weight 3.83 kg (8 lb 7 oz), with spring to fall average weights of 3.1 to 5.07 kg (6 lb 13 oz to 11 lb 3 oz) while females average 3.53 kg (7 lb 13 oz), with spring to fall averages of 3.08 to 4.8 kg (6 lb 13 oz to 10 lb 9 oz). Seasonal weight changes reflect circannual deposition and use of fat. Groundhogs attain progressively higher weights each year for the first two or three years, after which weight plateaus.

Groundhogs have four incisors, which grow 1.5 millimetres (1/16 in) per week. Constant usage wears them down by about that much each week. Unlike the incisors of many other rodents, the incisors of groundhogs are white to ivory-white. Groundhogs are well-adapted for digging, with powerful, short legs and broad, long claws. The groundhog's tail is shorter than that of other Sciuridae—only about one-fourth of body length.

== Genetics-phylogenetics ==
Groundhogs have 38 chromosomes, 18 autosomal pairs plus two sex chromosomes, XX (female) or XY (male). To date, whole genome sequences of three groundhogs (2 males, 1 female) have been deposited in NIH Genbank. These sequencing projects show that haploid genome of groundhogs span 2.6-2.7 Gigabase (Gb) in comparison to 3.1Gb and 46 chromosomes in humans Human genome. Phylogeny of the squirrels has not been completely resolved. However, phylogenetic studies based on multi-loci genetic (mitochondrial and nuclear DNA) makers and calibrated with fossil data estimate that Marmota monax (groundhog) emerged about 5.2 Mya from a common ancestor. Furthermore, Marmota monax is considered genetically more close to Eurasian marmot species than to other North American species. Its closest relatives include Alaska marmot (M. broweri, North America) and Alpine marmot (M. marmota, Europe).

== Distribution and habitat ==
Groundhog sitting above burrow entrance at Split Rock Lighthouse, MN, USA

The groundhog dwells in lowland habitats, unlike other marmots that live in rocky and mountainous areas. Marmota monax has a wide geographic range. The groundhog prefers open country and the edges of woodland, being rarely found far from a burrow entrance. It can typically be found in small woodlots, low-elevation forests, fields and pastures, and hedgerows. It constructs dens in well-drained soil, and most groundhogs have summer and winter dens. Human activity has increased food access and abundance, allowing M. monax to thrive.

== Behavior ==
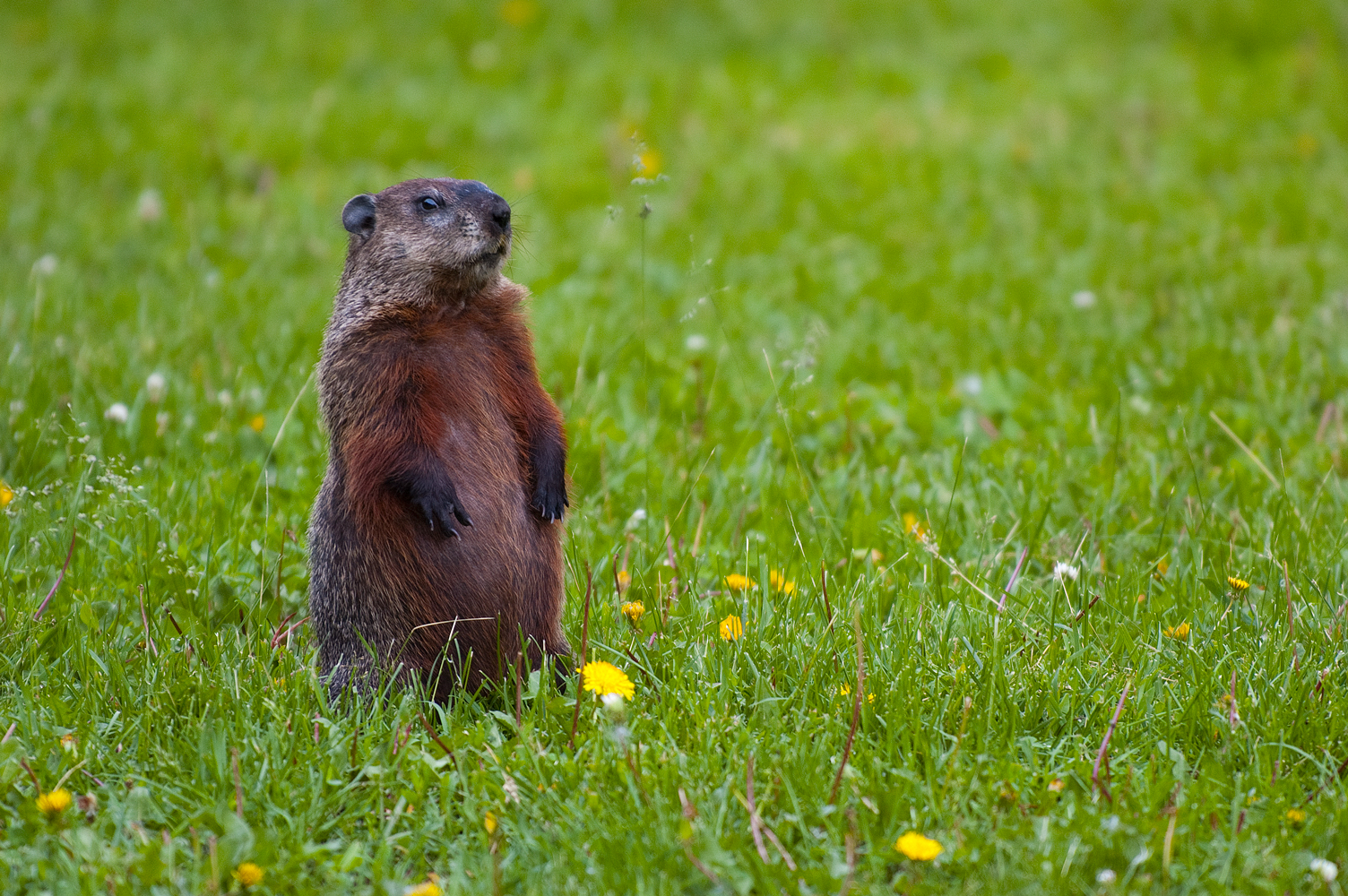
A motionless individual, alert to danger, will whistle when alarmed to warn other groundhogs.

W.J. Schoonmaker reports that groundhogs may hide when they see, smell, or hear an observer. Marmot researcher Ken Armitage states that the social biology of the groundhog is poorly studied. Despite their heavy-bodied appearance, groundhogs are accomplished swimmers and occasionally climb trees when escaping predators or when they want to survey their surroundings. They prefer to retreat to their burrows when threatened; if the burrow is invaded, the groundhog tenaciously defends itself with its two large incisors and front claws. Groundhogs are generally agonistic and territorial toward each other and may skirmish to establish dominance. Outside their burrow, individuals are alert when not actively feeding. It is common to see one or more nearly motionless individuals standing erect on their hind feet watching for danger. When alarmed, they use a high-pitched whistle to warn the rest of the colony, hence the name "whistle-pig". Groundhogs may squeal when fighting, seriously injured, or caught by a predator. Other vocalizations include low barks and a sound produced by grinding their teeth. David P. Barash wrote that he witnessed only two occasions of upright play-fighting among woodchucks and that the upright posture of play-fighting involves sustained physical contact between individuals that may require a degree of social tolerance virtually unknown in M. monax. Alternatively, upright play-fighting may be a part of the woodchuck's behavioral repertoire that rarely is shown because of physical spacing and/or low social tolerance.

=== Diet ===
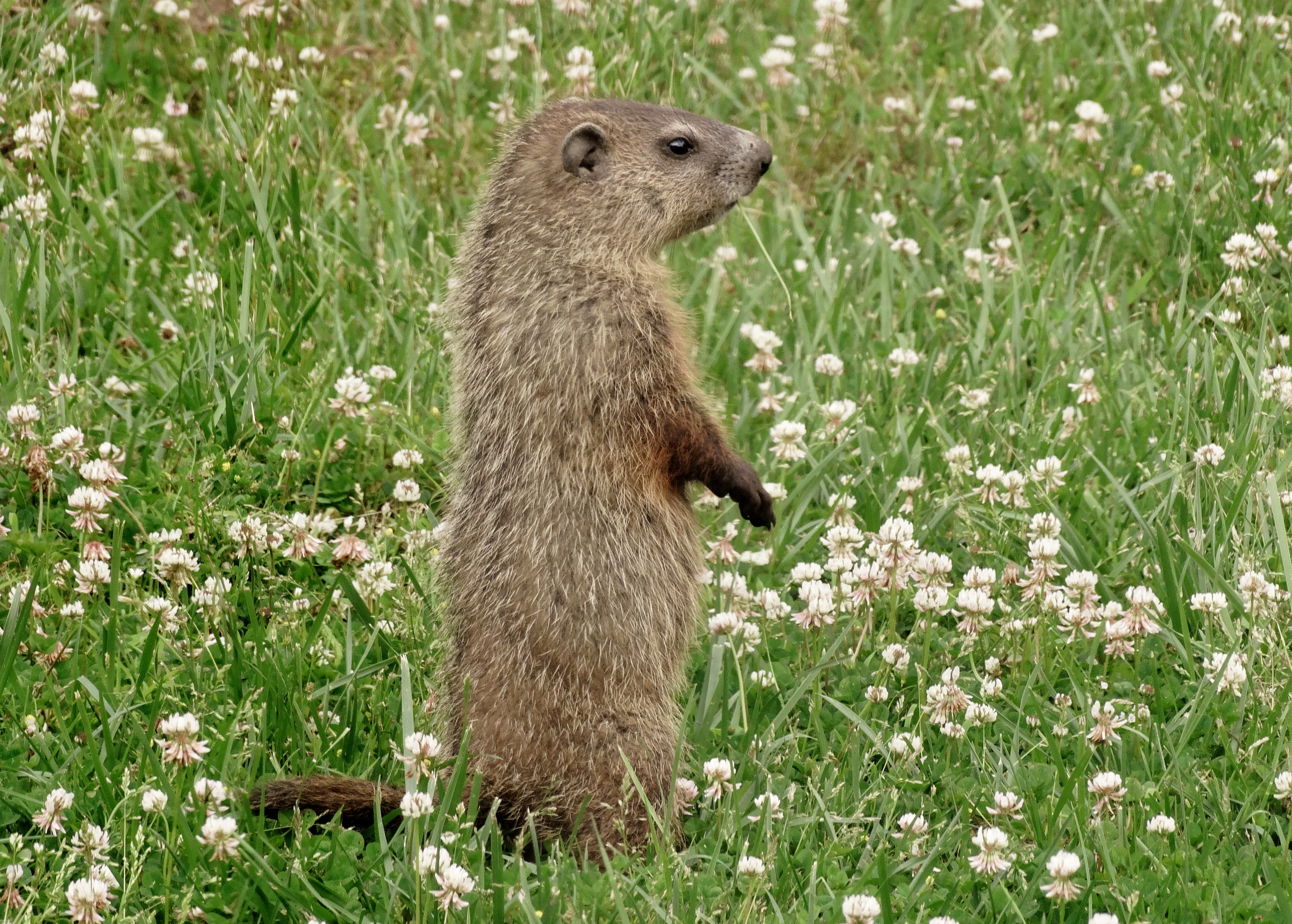
Clover is a preferred food source for groundhogs.

Eating wild vegetation

Mostly herbivorous, groundhogs eat primarily wild grasses and other vegetation, including berries, bark, leaves, and agricultural crops, when available. In early spring, dandelion and coltsfoot are important groundhog food items. Some additional foods include sheep sorrel, timothy-grass, buttercup, persicaria, agrimony, red and black raspberries, mulberries, buckwheat, plantain, wild lettuce, alfalfa, and all varieties of clover. Groundhogs also occasionally eat small animals, such as grubs, grasshoppers, snails, and even bird eggs and baby birds, but are not as omnivorous as many other Sciuridae.

An adult groundhog can eat more than 1 lb (0.45 kg) of vegetation daily. In early June, woodchucks' metabolism slows, and while their food intake decreases, their weight increases by as much as 100% as they produce fat deposits to sustain them during hibernation and late winter. Instead of storing food, groundhogs stuff themselves to survive the winter without eating. Groundhogs are reported to obtain needed liquids from the juices of edible plants, aided by their sprinkling with rain or dew.

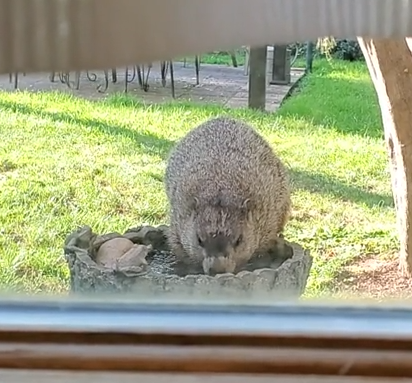
Groundhog drinking water from a bird bath in Swarthmore PA, USA.

=== Burrows ===
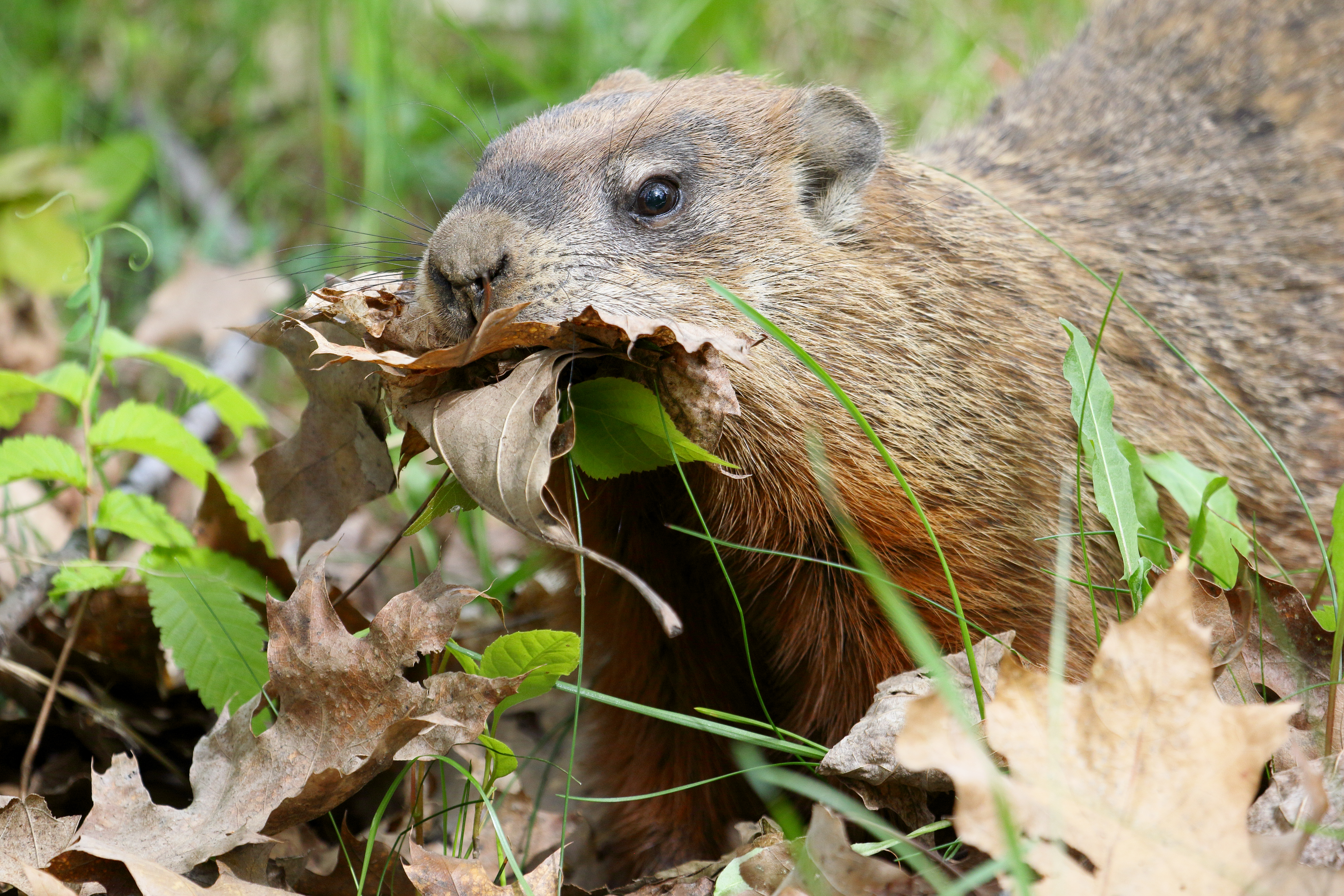
Groundhog gathering nesting material for its warm burrow

Groundhogs are excellent burrowers, using burrows for sleeping, rearing young, and hibernating. Groundhog burrows usually have two to five entrances, providing groundhogs their primary means of escape from predators. The volume of earth removed from groundhog burrows in one study averaged 6 cubic feet (0.17 m^{3}) per den. The longest burrow measured 24 feet (7.3 m) in addition to two short side galleries.

Though groundhogs are the most solitary of the marmots, several individuals may occupy the same burrow.

Burrows can pose a serious threat to agricultural and residential development by damaging farm machinery and even undermining building foundations. John Griffin, the Humane Society of the United States' senior director of urban wildlife, said that in decades of field work he hasn't seen significant problems from groundhog digging. "If there is an issue, it's typically a structural problem with the building from the beginning," he says. The burrow is used for safety, retreat in bad weather, hibernating, sleeping, mating, and nursery. In addition to the nest, there is an excrement chamber. The hibernation or nest chamber is lined with dead leaves and dried grasses. The nest chamber may be about twenty inches to three feet (51–91 cm) below ground surface. It is about 16 inches (41 cm) wide and 14 inches (36 cm) high. There are typically two burrow openings or holes. One is the main entrance, the other a spy hole. Description of the length of the burrow often includes side galleries. Excluding side galleries, Schoonmaker reports the longest was 24 feet (7.3 m), and the average length of eleven dens was 14 feet (4.3 m). W. H. Fisher investigated nine burrows, finding the deepest point 49 inches (120 cm) down. The longest, including side galleries, was 47 ft 11.5 in (14.62 m). Numbers of burrows per individual groundhog decrease with urbanization.

Bachman mentioned when young groundhogs are a few months old, they prepare for separation, digging a number of holes in the area of their early home. Some of these holes were only a few feet deep and never occupied, but the numerous burrows gave the impression that groundhogs live in communities.

Abandoned groundhog burrows benefit many other species by providing shelter. They are used by cottontail rabbits, raccoons, foxes, river otters, eastern chipmunks, and a wide variety of small mammals, snakes, and birds.

=== Hibernation ===
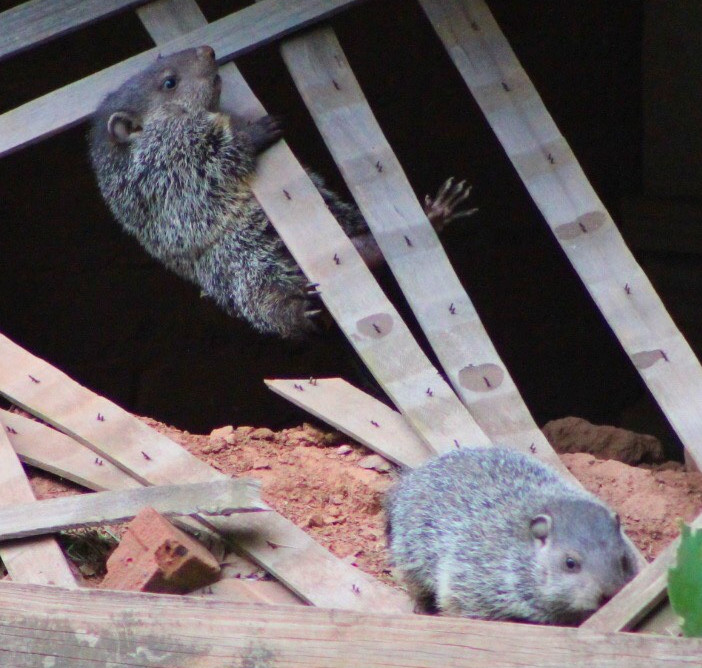
Two baby groundhogs

Groundhogs are one of the few species that enter into true hibernation, and often build a separate "winter burrow" for this purpose. This burrow is usually in a wooded or brushy area and is dug below the frost line and remains at a stable temperature well above freezing during the winter months. In most areas, groundhogs hibernate from October to March or April, but in more temperate areas, they may hibernate as little as three months. Groundhogs hibernate longer in northern latitudes than southern latitudes. To survive the winter, they are at their maximum weight shortly before entering hibernation. When the groundhog enters hibernation, there is a drop in body temperature to as low as 35 degrees Fahrenheit (2 °C), heart rate falls to 4–10 beats per minute and breathing rate falls to one breath every six minutes. During hibernation, they experience periods of torpor and arousal. Hibernating woodchucks lose as much as half their body weight by February. They emerge from hibernation with some remaining body fat to live on until the warmer spring weather produces abundant plant materials for food. Males emerge from hibernation before females. Groundhogs are mostly diurnal and are often active early in the morning or late afternoon.

=== Reproduction ===
Groundhogs are considered the most solitary of the marmot species. They live in aggregations, and their social organization also varies across populations. Groundhogs do not form stable, long-term pair bonds, and during mating season male-female interactions are limited to copulation. Groundhogs in Ohio, however, have been observed to have different social organization than groundhogs elsewhere, with adult males and females associating with each other throughout the year and often from year to year. Usually groundhogs breed in their second year, but a small proportion may breed in their first. The breeding season extends from early March to mid- or late April, after hibernation. Woodchucks are polygynous but only alpine and woodchuck marmot females have been shown to mate with multiple males. A mated pair remains in the same den throughout the 31- to 32-day gestation period. As birth of the young approaches in April or May, the male leaves the den. One litter is produced annually. Female woodchucks give birth to one to nine offspring, with most litters ranging between 3 and 5 pups. Groundhog mothers introduce their young to the wild once their fur is grown in and they can see. At this time, if at all, the father groundhog comes back to the family. By the end of August, the family breaks up; or at least, the larger number scatter, to burrow on their own.

== Health and mortality ==
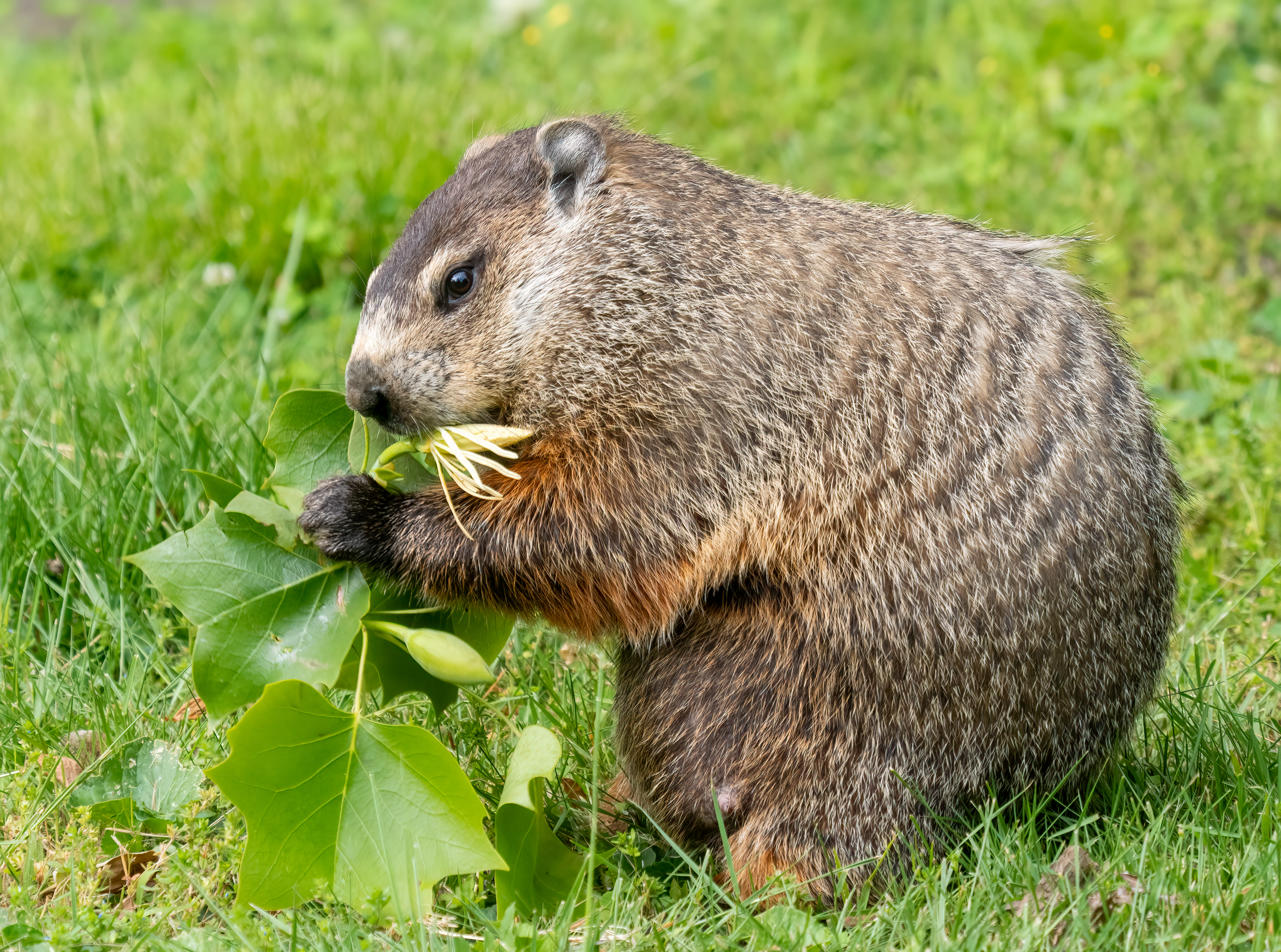
Eating tulip poplar in New York

In the wild, groundhogs can live up to six years with two or three being the average life expectancy. In captivity, groundhogs can live up to 14 years. Human development often leaves vacant space near secondary forests, which are indigenous to groundhogs, which ensures that groundhogs in well-developed areas are nearly free of predators other than humans (through various forms of pest control or vehicular incursion) or mid-to-large sized dogs.

Occasionally, woodchucks may suffer from parasitism, and a woodchuck may die from infestation or from bacteria transmitted by vectors. In areas of intensive agriculture and the dairying regions of the state of Wisconsin, particularly in southern areas, the woodchuck had been almost extirpated by 1950. Jackson (1961) suggested that exaggerated reports of damage done by the woodchuck led to excessive culling, substantially reducing its numbers in the state.

In some areas woodchucks are important game animals and are killed regularly for sport, food, or fur. In Kentucky, an estimated 267,500 specimens were taken annually from 1964 to 1971. Woodchucks had protected status in the state of Wisconsin until 2017. Woodchuck numbers appear to have decreased in Illinois.

=== Natural predators ===
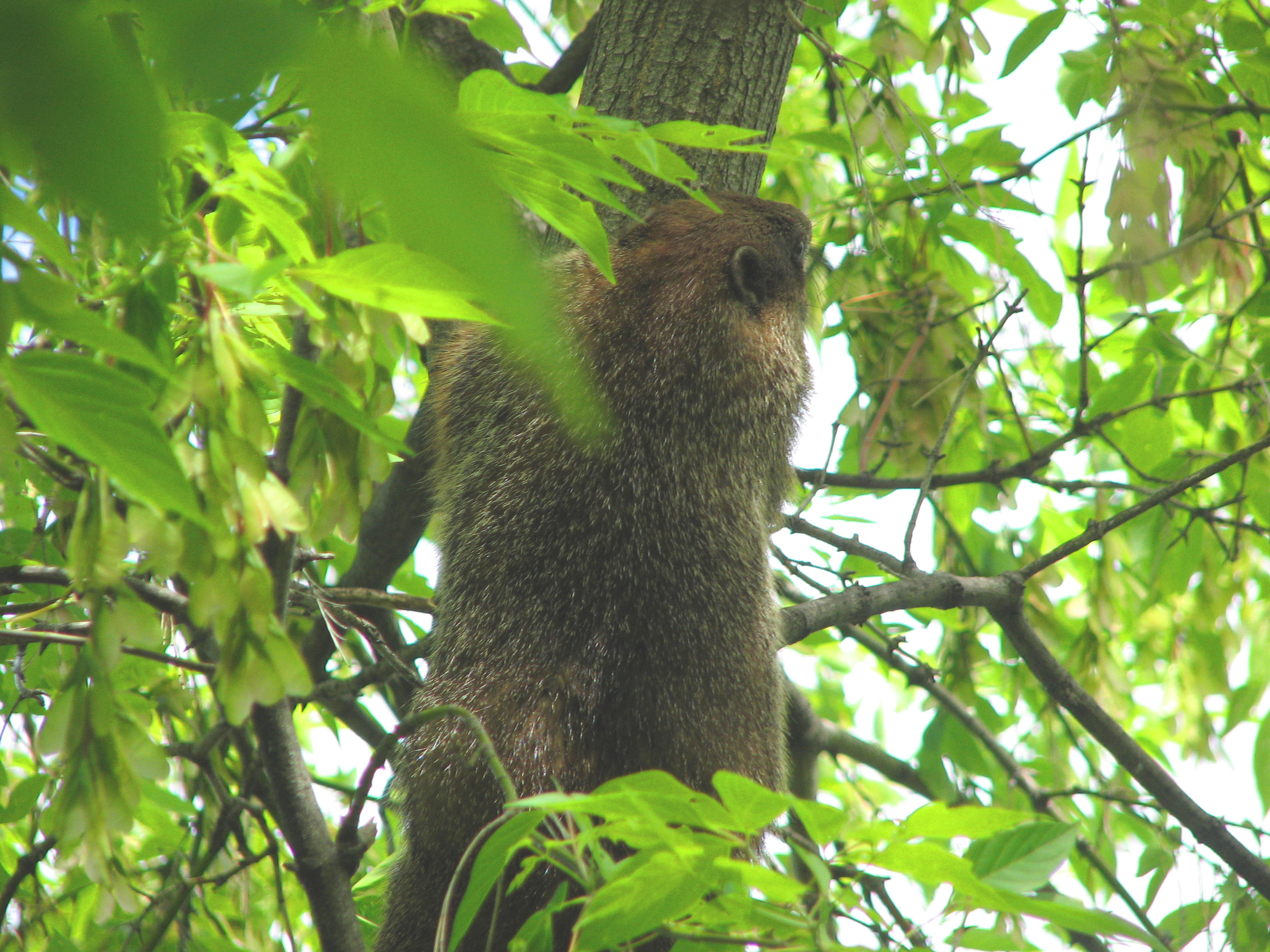
Groundhogs can climb trees to escape predators.

Wild predators of adult groundhogs in most of eastern North America include coyotes, badgers, bobcats, and foxes (largely red fox). Many of these predators are successful stealth stalkers that catch groundhogs by surprise before they can escape to their burrows; badgers likely hunt them by digging them out from their burrows. Coyotes in particular are sizable enough to overpower any groundhog with the latter being the third most significant prey species per a statewide study in Pennsylvania.

Large predators such as the gray wolf and eastern cougar are likely extirpated in the east but still may hunt groundhogs on occasion in Canada. Golden eagles can also prey on adult groundhogs, but seldom occur in the same range or in the same habitats as this marmot. Likewise, great horned owls can reportedly, per Bent (1938), prey upon groundhogs but rarely do so, given the temporal differences in their behaviors.

Young groundhogs (usually those less than a couple months in age) may also be taken by the American mink, and perhaps other small mustelids, cats, timber rattlesnakes, and hawks. Red-tailed hawks can take groundhogs at least of up to the size of yearling juveniles and northern goshawks can take them up to perhaps young adulthood in the spring.

Beyond their large size, groundhogs have several successful anti-predator behaviors, such as concealing their burrows under trees in the winter months and scaling trees to escape a threat.

== Relationship with humans ==
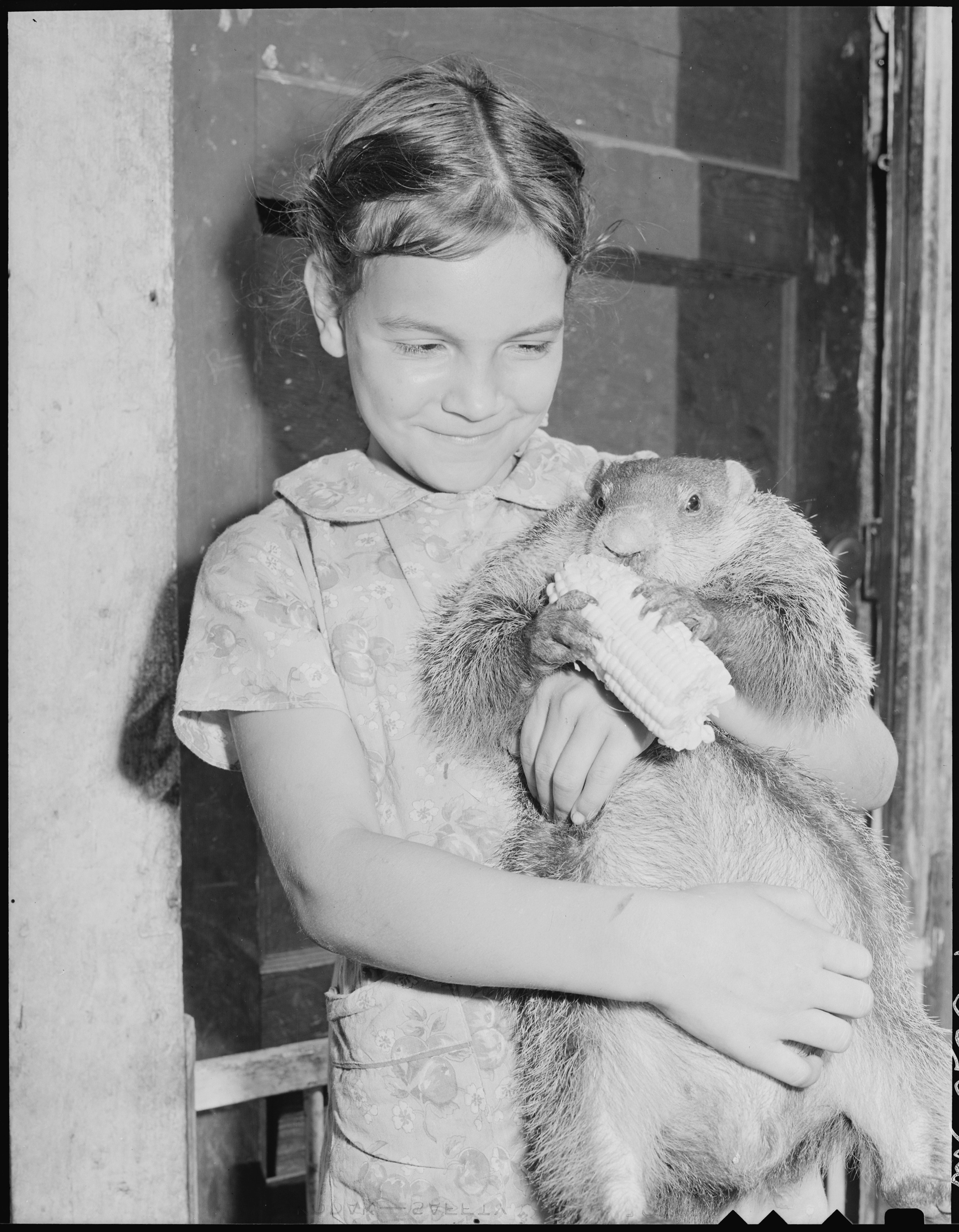
Daughter of a Lejunior, Kentucky, coal miner with her pet groundhog (1946)

=== Resource competition ===
Both their diet and their habit of burrowing make groundhogs a challenge around farms and gardens. They will eat many commonly grown vegetables, and extensive burrowing can undermine building foundations.

=== Shared ecosystem ===
Very often, the dens of groundhogs provide homes for other animals, including skunks, red foxes, and cottontail rabbits. Foxes and skunks feed upon field mice, grasshoppers, beetles, and other creatures that destroy farm crops. In aiding these animals, the groundhog can also indirectly help the farmer. In addition to providing homes for itself and other animals, the groundhog aids in soil improvement by bringing subsoil to the surface. The groundhog is also a valuable game animal and is considered a difficult sport when hunted in a fair manner. In some parts of the U.S., they have historically been eaten, and in some places are still considered a delicacy.

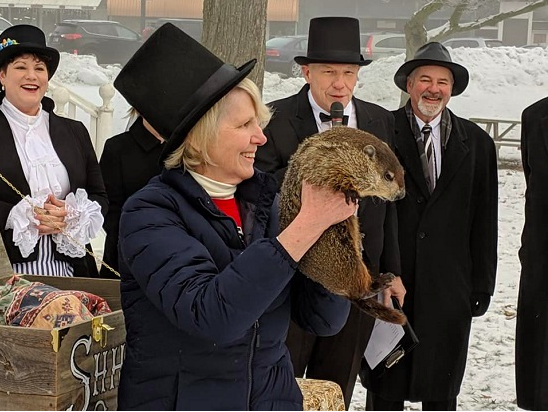
Groundhog during Groundhog Day

=== Historical settler perspective ===
A report in 1883 by the New Hampshire Legislative Woodchuck Committee describes the groundhog's objectionable character:

The woodchuck, despite its deformities both of mind and body, possesses some of the amenities of a higher civilization. It cleans its face after the manner of the squirrels, and licks its fur after the manner of a cat. Your committee is too wise, however, to be deceived by this purely superficial observation of better habits. Contemporaneous with the ark, the woodchuck has not made any material progress in social science, and it is now too late to reform the wayward sinner. The average age of the woodchuck is too long to please your committee.... The woodchuck is not only a nuisance, but also a bore. It burrows beneath the soil, and then chuckles to see a mowing machine, man and all, slump into one of these holes and disappear....

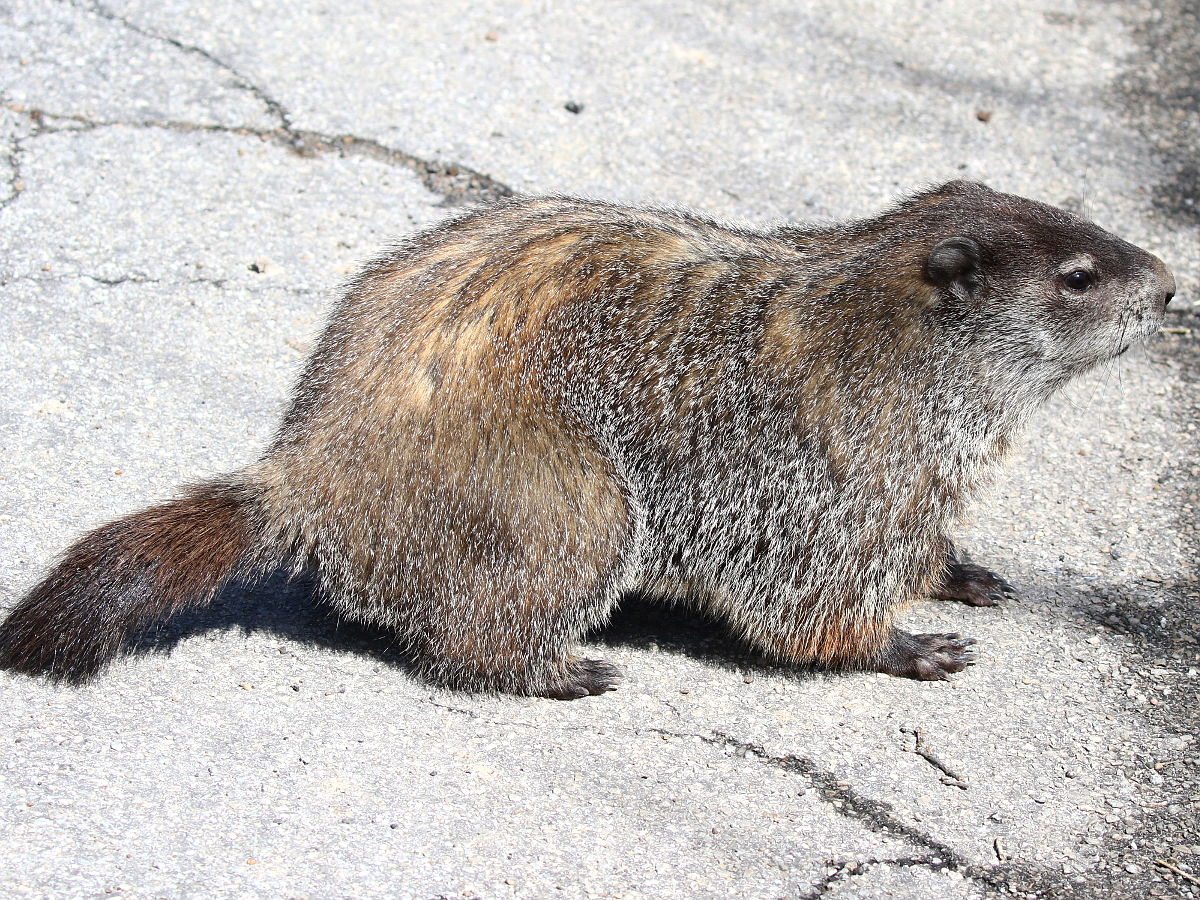
Close encounter with a photographer at Sheldon Marsh State Nature Preserve, Ohio

=== Captivity ===
Groundhogs may be raised in captivity, but their aggressive nature can pose problems. Doug Schwartz, a zookeeper and groundhog trainer at the Staten Island Zoo, has been quoted as saying "They're known for their aggression, so you're starting from a hard place. His natural impulse is to kill 'em all and let God sort 'em out. You have to work to produce the sweet and cuddly." Groundhogs cared for in wildlife rehabilitation that survive but cannot be returned to the wild may remain with their caregivers and become educational ambassadors.

=== Holiday ===
In the United States and Canada, the yearly Groundhog Day celebration on February 2 has given the groundhog recognition and popularity. The most popularly known of these groundhogs are Punxsutawney Phil, Buckeye Chuck, Wiarton Willie, Shubenacadie Sam, Jimmy the Groundhog, Dunkirk Dave, and Staten Island Chuck kept as part of Groundhog Day festivities in Punxsutawney, Pennsylvania; Marion, Ohio; Wiarton, Ontario; Shubenacadie, Nova Scotia; Sun Prairie, Wisconsin; Dunkirk, New York; and Staten Island respectively. The 1993 comedy film Groundhog Day references several events related to Groundhog Day, and portrays both Punxsutawney Phil himself, and the annual Groundhog Day ceremony. Famous Southern groundhogs include General Beauregard Lee, based at Dauset Trails Nature Center outside Atlanta, Georgia.

=== Animal testing ===
Groundhogs are used in medical research on hepatitis B–induced liver cancer. A percentage of the woodchuck population is infected with the woodchuck hepatitis virus (WHV), which is similar to human hepatitis B virus. Humans cannot contract hepatitis from woodchucks with WHV, but the virus and its effects on the liver make the woodchuck the best available animal for the study of viral hepatitis in humans. The only other animal model for hepatitis B virus studies is the chimpanzee, an endangered species. Woodchucks are also used in biomedical research investigating metabolic function, obesity, energy balance, the endocrine system, reproduction, neurology, cardiovascular disease, cerebrovascular disease, and neoplastic disease. Researching the hibernation patterns of groundhogs may lead to benefits for humans, including the ability to lower a patient's heart rate during complicated surgical procedures.

=== Archaeology ===
Groundhog burrows have revealed at least two archaeological sites, the Ufferman Site in the U.S. state of Ohio and Meadowcroft Rockshelter in Pennsylvania. Archaeologists have never excavated the Ufferman Site, but the activities of local groundhogs have revealed numerous artifacts. They favor the loose soil of the esker where the site lies, and their burrow digging has brought many objects to the surface: human and animal bones, pottery, and bits of stone. Woodchuck remains were found in the Indian mounds at Aztalan, Jefferson County, Wisconsin.

=== Media ===
Robert Frost's poem "A Drumlin Woodchuck" uses the imagery of a groundhog dug into a small ridge as a metaphor for his emotional reticence.
