= General Beauregard Lee =

Name of groundhog in Georgia, USA

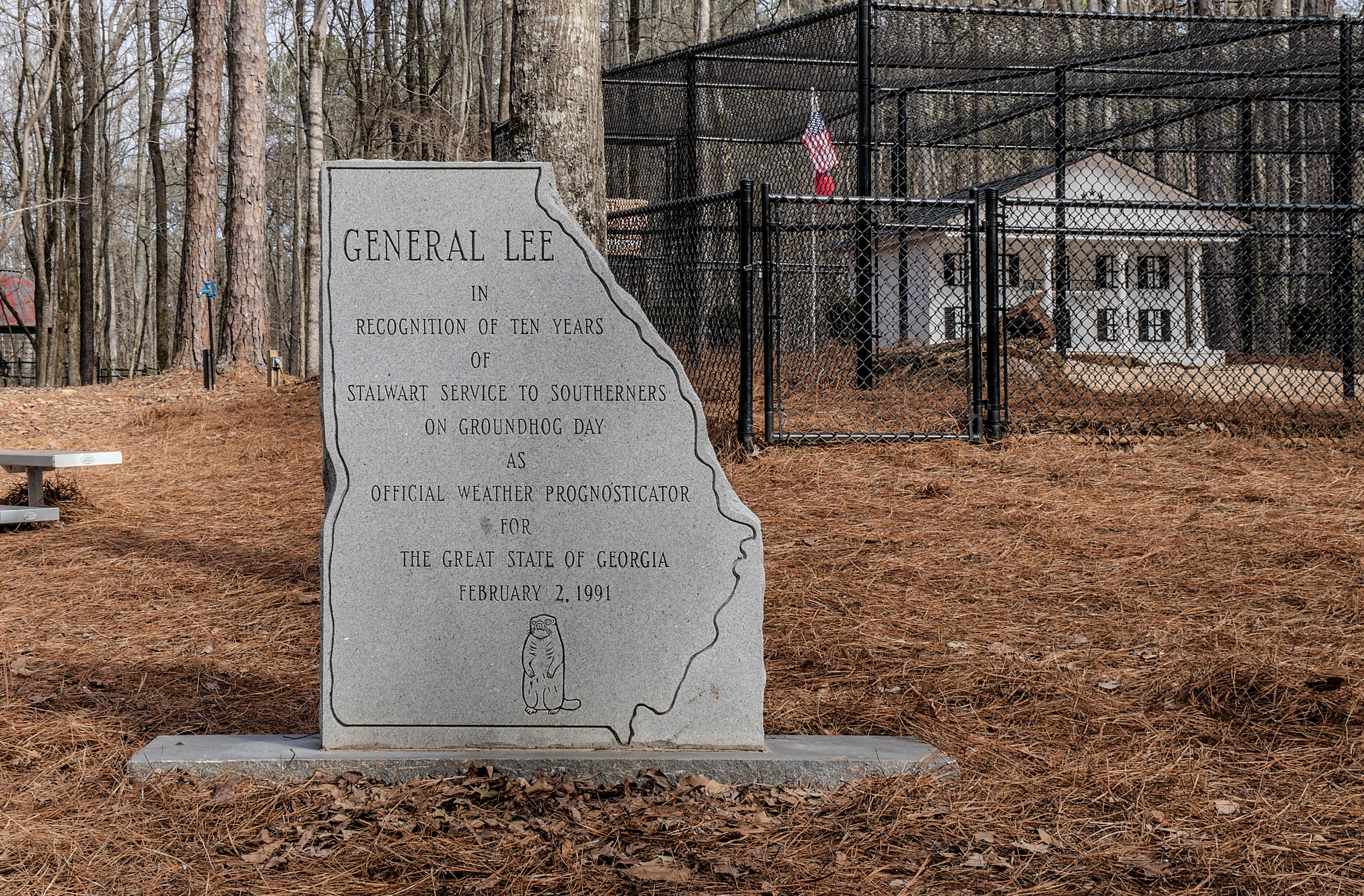
General Beauregard Lee exhibit at Dauset Trails

General Beauregard Lee is a groundhog in the US state of Georgia widely considered to be the Groundhog Day weather prognosticator for the Southern United States.

The previous forecaster before General Beauregard Lee was General Robert E. Lee, who started making predictions in 1981. He was named after the American Confederate General of the same name. General Beauregard Lee's first nationally televised appearance was in 1988. General Beauregard Lee resided at Yellow River Game Ranch in Gwinnett County, Georgia for 27 years until the ranch suddenly closed in December 2017. He was then relocated to Dauset Trails Nature Center in Jackson, Georgia, to carry on his weather-predicting tradition.

In 2025, the National Oceanic and Atmospheric Administration calculated General Lee to be more accurate than Punxsutawney Phil, boasting an 80% accurate rate compared to Phil's 35%. The groundhog-sized ante-bellum style mansion that General Lee lives in is known as Weathering Heights.

== Past predictions ==
General Lee's predictions
	1981	1982	1983	1984	1985	1986	1987	1988	1989
1990	1991	1992	1993	1994	1995	1996	1997	1998	1999
2000	2001	2002	2003	2004	2005	2006	2007	2008	2009
2010	2011	2012	2013	2014	2015	2016	2017	2018	2019
2020	2021	2022	2023	2024	2025	2026			

"Long winter" (5)
"Early spring" (40)
No record (1)

== List of individual General Lee namesakes ==
- General Robert E. Lee (1981-1991): This General Lee was considered to have had predicted the weather correctly nine out of ten times from 1981 to 1990. General Robert E. Lee retired in 1991 after he became too old and too fat. In February 1991, a commemorative marker was put on display at Yellow River Game Ranch in celebration of his retirement.
- General Beauregard Lee (1991-): He was born in 1990 and was a distant relation of the previous General Lee. His namesake is an homage to Generals P. G. T. Beauregard and Robert E. Lee. In 1991, he and General Robert E. Lee shared the role of groundhog prognosticator at Yellow River Game Ranch, and the next year Beauregard Lee had his first solo role. He was considered to have gotten the prediction for 1993 wrong due the blizzard that hit the South that year.
