= Wiarton =

- Community
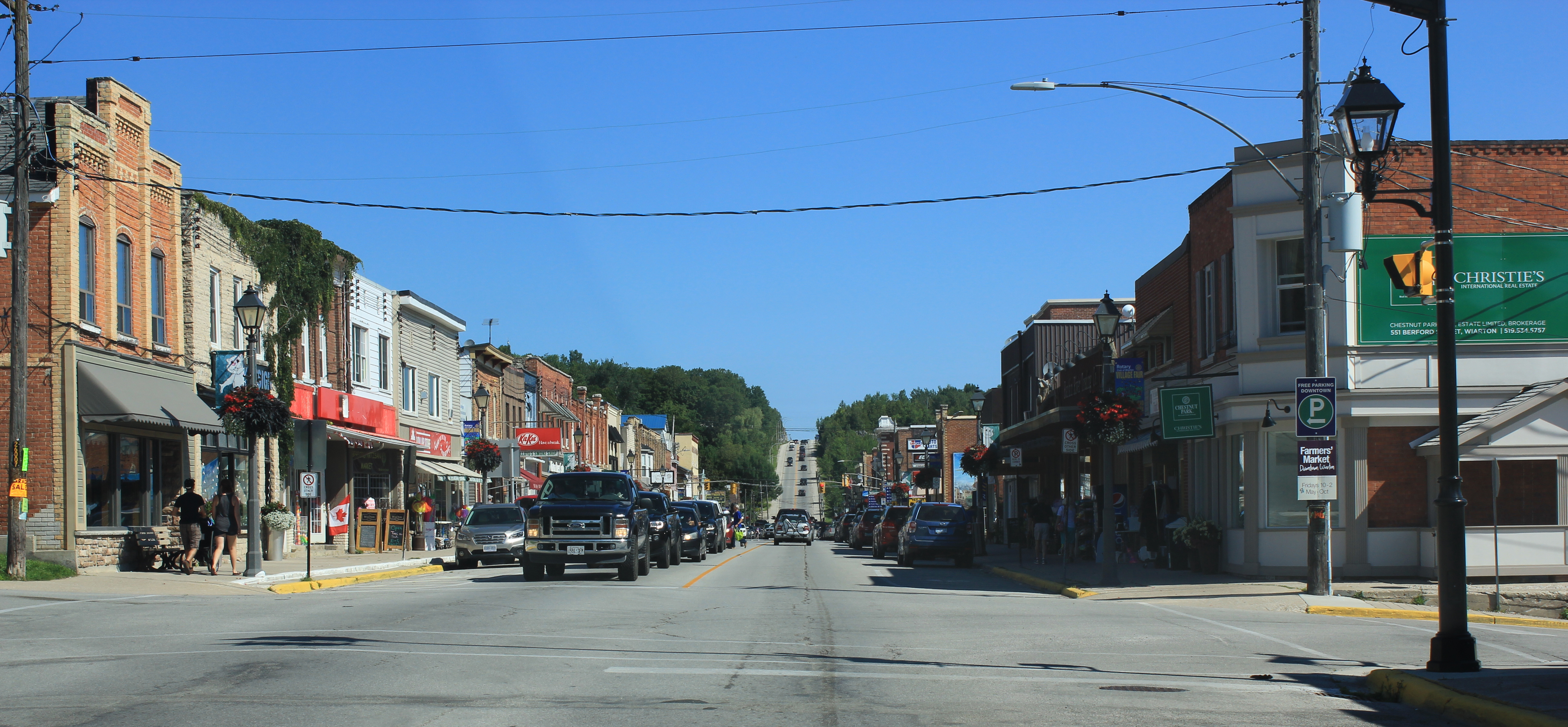
- Highway 6 in Wiarton

- Location of Wiarton in Ontario Wiarton (Ontario)
- Coordinates: 44°44′37″N 81°08′27″W
- Country: Canada
- Province: Ontario
- County: Bruce
- Municipality: South Bruce Peninsula
- Settled: 1866
- Incorporated: 1880 (village)
- Incorporated: 1894 (town)
- Amalgamated: 1999

Population (2016)
  - Total: 1,989
- Time zone: UTC-5 (EST)
  - Summer (DST): UTC-4 (EDT)

Wiarton (/ˈwaɪərtən/) is a community in the town of South Bruce Peninsula, Bruce County, Ontario, Canada. It is located at the western end of Colpoys Bay, an inlet off Georgian Bay, on the Bruce Peninsula.

Wiarton is notable for the Wiarton Willie Festival, in February each year (starting in 1956), when national and international media cover Wiarton Willie and his Groundhog Day prediction. In the summer, Wiarton hosts the Bruce Peninsula Multisport Race.

== History ==
Wiarton was named after the birthplace of Sir Edmund Head, the Governor General of Canada from 1854 to 1861. In 1880, Wiarton was incorporated as a village, then with a population of 750. By 1894, Wiarton had become an incorporated town.

The Government of Ontario has erected two historic plaques in Wiarton, offering a glimpse into the past of this area. The first discusses the fact that the Bruce Peninsula is a barrier to water transportation between Lake Huron and southern Georgian Bay. To avoid a difficult detour to the north, aboriginal peoples developed a portage route across the base of the peninsula. "For centuries, the Bruce Peninsula portage was an important link in the Great Lakes transportation network." The second plaque discusses developments in the 1800s, starting with 1855 when "a town-plot was laid out here on recently acquired Indigenous land and named Wiarton, reputedly after the English birthplace of Edmund Head, Governor General of Canada (1854-61)".

Until 1997, when the service was transferred to Thunder Bay, Ontario, Wiarton was known around Lake Huron and Georgian Bay, as the home of Wiarton Coast Guard Radio, providing continuous weather reports to mariners and residents.

In 1999, Wiarton was administratively amalgamated into the new municipality of the Town of South Bruce Peninsula.

=== Historical timeline, 1850 to 1906 ===
Although specific dates vary depending on the source, the following are excerpted from a reliable source, History of the County of Bruce, Ontario, Canada, by Norman Robertson, published in 1906.

- Mid 1800s: Settlers are arriving and opening businesses. Since there is no wharf for shipping, the community developed on top of the hill, the business centre being at the corner where Gould Street is crossed by Division Street.
- 1868: B. B. Miller opens a hotel and post-office; two others open stores.
- 1870s: Wharves are constructed and mills erected; many places of business move to Berford Street; by 1879, Gould Street is largely residential.
- 1868-70: A steam ship from Collingwood, named the Hero, arrives once or twice a week. By 1869, the steamer Champion makes daily trips to Owen Sound, for improved trade such as the marketing of grain. A dock and warehouse are built. A pharmacy, sawmill and stores open.
- 1870: A published directory indicates "Population about 200, grain and lumber form the principal trade here. It has a mail four times a week". There are two hotels by this time.
- 1876: Population is now about 400. A stagecoach is making regular trips to and from Owen Sound. The electric telegraph has reached the town. There is now a grist mill, two steam mills, a planning mill and a tannery. Four churches are holding services.
- 1877: A stone school house and two additional churches are built
- 1880: Wiarton becomes an incorporated village with a population of 752.
- 1882: The railway reaches the village; this will soon make Wiarton into "the commercial entrepot for the peninsula".
- 1891: The old public school building is expanded and made into a high school.
- 1893: Wiarton is incorporated into a town, effective 1 January 1894. The first mayor is B. B. Millar.
- 1900: After council meetings at makeshift premises, a new town hall opens. By now, several large furniture manufacturing facilities, a woolen mill, and a foundry are operating. The Dominion Fish Co. has its central packing plant in Wiarton where some 120,000 pounds of fish are received each week, to be cleaned, frozen, packed and shipped.
- 1902-1904: The Wiarton Beet Sugar Manufacturing Company, Limited is built, opens and declares bankruptcy during this time, leaving huge debts.
- 1906: Robertson recaps the recent history: "Wiarton has made more rapid progress than any other village or town in the county of Bruce. True, it has had its setbacks, such as occurred when the Grand Trunk Railway opened the Owen Sound branch and made that point its principal northern terminus, and again when the sugar refinery failed. Still, it is the busiest town in the county, and the townspeople are hopeful and confident of continued and prolonged prosperity. We trust that these fond hopes may be fully realized."
- 1949, the Wiarton Red Cross Outpost is replaced with the Wiarton Hospital.

== Geography ==
Geographically, the town is defined by the rugged limestone cliffs of the Niagara Escarpment (a UNESCO World Biosphere Reserve – one of only twelve such reserves in Canada), which bisects the town. The town rests on the picturesque shores of Colpoys Bay, part of Georgian Bay, which is itself part of Lake Huron, one of the Great Lakes.

The town has long been known as the gateway to the Bruce Peninsula, the peninsula separating Georgian Bay from the rest of Lake Huron.

=== Climate ===
Wiarton has a warm summer humid continental climate (Dfb under the Koppen Climate Classification) with four distinct seasons. Winters are cold and very snowy with much of it coming from lake effect snow. Because of its location on three sides of water, snowfall totals are very high with an annual average of 404.8 cm. Summers are warm and sunny with a July average of 18.9 degrees Celsius. The average precipitation is 1047.9 mm.

Climate data for Wiarton Airport (1991−2020 normals, extremes 1947–present)
Month	Jan	Feb	Mar	Apr	May	Jun	Jul	Aug	Sep	Oct	Nov	Dec	Year
Record high °C (°F)	17.8 (64.0)	16.9 (62.4)	27.2 (81.0)	30.0 (86.0)	32.1 (89.8)	33.3 (91.9)	34.2 (93.6)	35.0 (95.0)	35.6 (96.1)	28.9 (84.0)	23.6 (74.5)	18.1 (64.6)	35.6 (96.1)
Mean daily maximum °C (°F)	−2.2 (28.0)	−1.7 (28.9)	2.7 (36.9)	10.0 (50.0)	16.9 (62.4)	21.8 (71.2)	24.3 (75.7)	23.6 (74.5)	20.1 (68.2)	13.2 (55.8)	6.5 (43.7)	1.0 (33.8)	11.3 (52.3)
Daily mean °C (°F)	−6.1 (21.0)	−6 (21)	−1.8 (28.8)	5.0 (41.0)	11.2 (52.2)	16.2 (61.2)	18.9 (66.0)	18.3 (64.9)	14.8 (58.6)	8.9 (48.0)	3.0 (37.4)	−2.2 (28.0)	6.7 (44.1)
Mean daily minimum °C (°F)	−9.9 (14.2)	−10.2 (13.6)	−6.2 (20.8)	0.1 (32.2)	5.5 (41.9)	10.5 (50.9)	13.6 (56.5)	13.1 (55.6)	9.5 (49.1)	4.6 (40.3)	−0.5 (31.1)	−5.3 (22.5)	2.1 (35.8)
Record low °C (°F)	−36.4 (−33.5)	−34.8 (−30.6)	−30.7 (−23.3)	−17.8 (0.0)	−5 (23)	−1.6 (29.1)	3.3 (37.9)	1.7 (35.1)	−3.4 (25.9)	−7.2 (19.0)	−18 (0)	−26.6 (−15.9)	−36.4 (−33.5)
Average precipitation mm (inches)	110.8 (4.36)	76.9 (3.03)	66.1 (2.60)	83.6 (3.29)	82.1 (3.23)	79.2 (3.12)	69.9 (2.75)	82.5 (3.25)	98.9 (3.89)	109.8 (4.32)	110.0 (4.33)	104.3 (4.11)	1,073.9 (42.28)
Average rainfall mm (inches)	26.6 (1.05)	19.8 (0.78)	34.5 (1.36)	68.0 (2.68)	81.4 (3.20)	79.2 (3.12)	69.9 (2.75)	82.5 (3.25)	98.9 (3.89)	105.5 (4.15)	70.1 (2.76)	27.4 (1.08)	763.7 (30.07)
Average snowfall cm (inches)	110.9 (43.7)	73.5 (28.9)	37.8 (14.9)	18.1 (7.1)	0.7 (0.3)	0.0 (0.0)	0.0 (0.0)	0.0 (0.0)	0.0 (0.0)	4.5 (1.8)	47.9 (18.9)	91.8 (36.1)	385.1 (151.6)
Average precipitation days (≥ 0.2 mm)	24.4	18.5	14.2	13.7	12.7	11.0	11.2	10.6	13.2	18.0	19.0	21.8	188.1
Average rainy days (≥ 0.2 mm)	5.2	3.7	6.5	11.2	12.5	11.0	11.2	10.6	13.2	17.5	12.2	6.7	121.4
Average snowy days (≥ 0.2 cm)	22.0	17.0	9.9	4.4	0.38	0.0	0.0	0.0	0.0	1.2	9.6	18.3	82.8
Average relative humidity (%) (at 15:00 LST)	78.0	72.1	64.5	59.2	58.7	63.2	62.6	64.0	65.4	67.9	72.6	77.2	67.1
Mean monthly sunshine hours	53.6	88.0	150.6	193.6	241.7	265.4	300.2	259.5	183.4	130.7	61.8	45.8	1,974.3
Percentage possible sunshine	18.7	30.0	40.8	48.0	52.7	57.0	63.7	59.6	48.7	38.3	21.4	16.7	41.3
Source: Environment Canada

== Economy ==
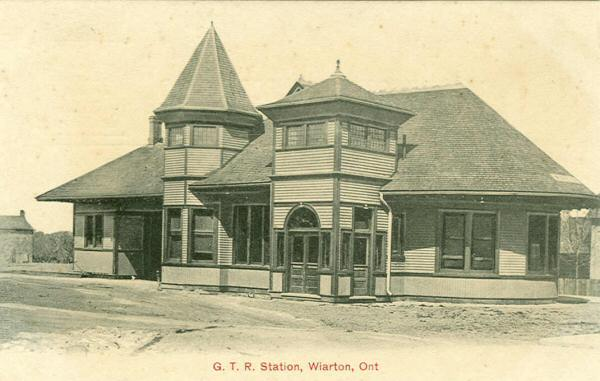
Wiarton railway station, 1907

Wiarton's most important businesses were initially founded on the lumber industry. The harvest of timber and the manufacture of goods from lumber were an important industry early in the town's development, until two widespread forest fires, the first in the late 1800s and the later in the early 1900s, wiped out the local forests.

The next most important industry was fishing. In 1906, Wiarton was awarded a federal fish hatchery, which helped maintain the fish stock in the area for many years. Fishing was at its peak in the early 20th century, but suffered from the introduction of the invasive sea lamprey to the upper Great Lakes through the Welland Canal in 1921. By 1932, the sea lamprey had arrived in Georgian Bay, and, together with the Great Depression, it brought the decline of the fishing industry.

In 1881, the first train arrived in the town as part of Grand Trunk Railway system, for which Wiarton served as its northern terminus, extending to a new wharf in Colpoys Bay constructed in 1882. The last passenger train ran in 1957, when the Canadian government cut back funding on the railways. Freight trains continued using the tracks until 1968, when the lines were abandoned.

Tourism as well as stone mining and finishing are now important economic forces in the town.

== Government ==
An elected mayor, deputy major and three councilors provide the municipal government for Wiarton and the many small villages and communities that comprise the Town of South Bruce Peninsula. A number of Committees and local Boards assist Council. "Council establishes policies and budgets for programs and services delivered by the Town of South Bruce Peninsula." The Legislative Services Department includes the Clerk's Division, By-Law Enforcement and Animal Control, and the Building Division.

Wiarton has fire stations, and policing is provided by the Ontario Provincial Police from the Wiarton Detachment.

== Attractions ==
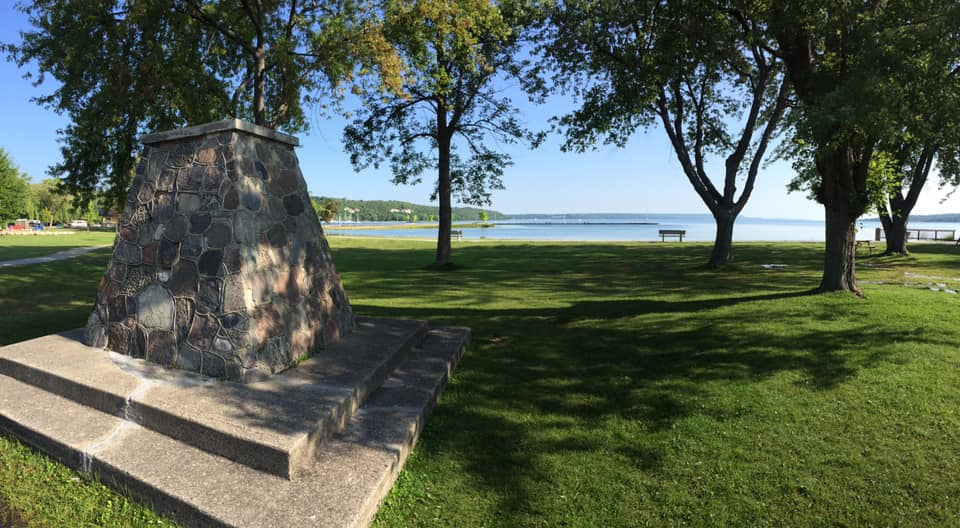
William Wilfred Campbell Cairn in Bluewater Park

Another notable feature is the Wiarton Willie Festival and Wiarton Willie, the albino groundhog who purportedly predicts the length of winter every Groundhog Day. Tourism forms an important part of the town's modern economy, attracting many seasonal visitors to the area's cottages and resorts, and to the town's marina. The Bruce Trail runs through town, with a main trail that is more than 890 km long and side trails of 400 km.

=== Other attractions ===
- The Grey Bruce Snowmobile Trail runs through Wiarton - access to trails towards Sauble Beach and Tobermory.
- Fishing - Colpoys Bay is a calm bay located on Georgian bay. Every year there are several fish derbies in the area, and large salmon and trout can be fished from the waters of the bay.

=== Festivals ===
- Wiarton Willie Festival - Groundhog Day
- William Wilfred Campbell Poetry & Arts Festival - June
- Subaru Multi-Sport Race - August
- Wiarton & District Agricultural Fall Fair - Third weekend in September

== Bus Transportation ==
- First Student Canada (buses from Owen Sound Ontario)

== Notable people ==
- William Wilfred Campbell – Poet Laureate of the Lakes
- Don Scott – author and politician
- Eileen Vollick – Canada's first licensed female pilot

== See also ==
- List of unincorporated communities in Ontario
