= Josh Eady =

Joshua Eady is a Canadian producer, video editor, and director working in endurance sports, adventure, and race based television.

Eady is best known for his role as the executive producer and director of Boundless, a documentary series produced for the Travel and Escape Network in Canada, and NBC’s Esquire Network in the United States. Eady has produced and directed for the Food Network, ESPN, Canwest, Alliance Films, CMT, Travel and Escape Network, and NBC’s Esquire Network.

Josh co-founded Eady Bros Productions, a broadcast production company specializing in interactive and television content. At Eady Bros, Josh directed and produced “Inside Dinning Out”, a one-hour special for Food Network and Discovery Asia, featuring Moriomoto the Iron Chef; executive produced and directed Boundless, an hour documentary series for T+E and NBC’s Esquire channel. As an editor Josh has worked on several television shows, including 3-time Gemini awardwinning Made to Order (Food Network, Fine Living), and 4-time Gemini Award-winning Departures (OLN, Discovery, National Geographic), where he received 3 back-to-back Gemini Award nominations for story editing in 2008, 2009, 2010.

== Education ==
- University of Western Ontario, Fine Art Media/Visual Communications, BA (Hons) 1998-2002
- Vancouver Film School, Film Studies/Post Production and Film Editing, (Hons) 2002-2003
- Columbia Academy of Design, Television Studies, 2002-2003

== Awards and honors ==
- 2008 Gemini Nominations for best editing in a documentary series
- 2009 Gemini Nomination for best editing in an information program or series
- 2010 Gemini Nomination for best editing in a documentary series
- Design Licks Award
- FWA Award
- Perfect Vision Award
- Marketing Magazine award
- Canadian New Media Finalist
