= Boundless (Canadian TV series) =

- Genre: Reality television
- Directed by: Joshua Eady
- Starring: Simon Donato and Paul Trebilcock
- Country of origin: Canada
- Original language: English
- No. of seasons: 3
- No. of episodes: 30

Production
- Producers: Jordan Eady; Joshua Eady; Lee Herberman; Henry Less
- Running time: approx. 56 minutes
- Production company: HLP Productions

Original release
- Network: Travel+Escape, Esquire Network

Boundless is a Canadian reality documentary series shown on Travel+Escape Channel and the Esquire Network. The series follows Simon Donato and Paul Trebilcock as they compete in the toughest endurance races on the planet.

== Series ==
The series covers Donato and Trebilcock as they compete in eight endurance events worldwide over five months, and arose from the documentary film Go Death Racer, produced by the same team. The first season of ten episodes premiered in February 2013 on the Travel+Escape Channel in Canada and was also shown on the Esquire Network in the United States later that year. The show was renewed for a second season in 2014. The third season completed broadcasting on Esquire on June 14, 2016; the series was then canceled. Boundless was later made available on Outside TV.
