= Dauset Trails Nature Center =

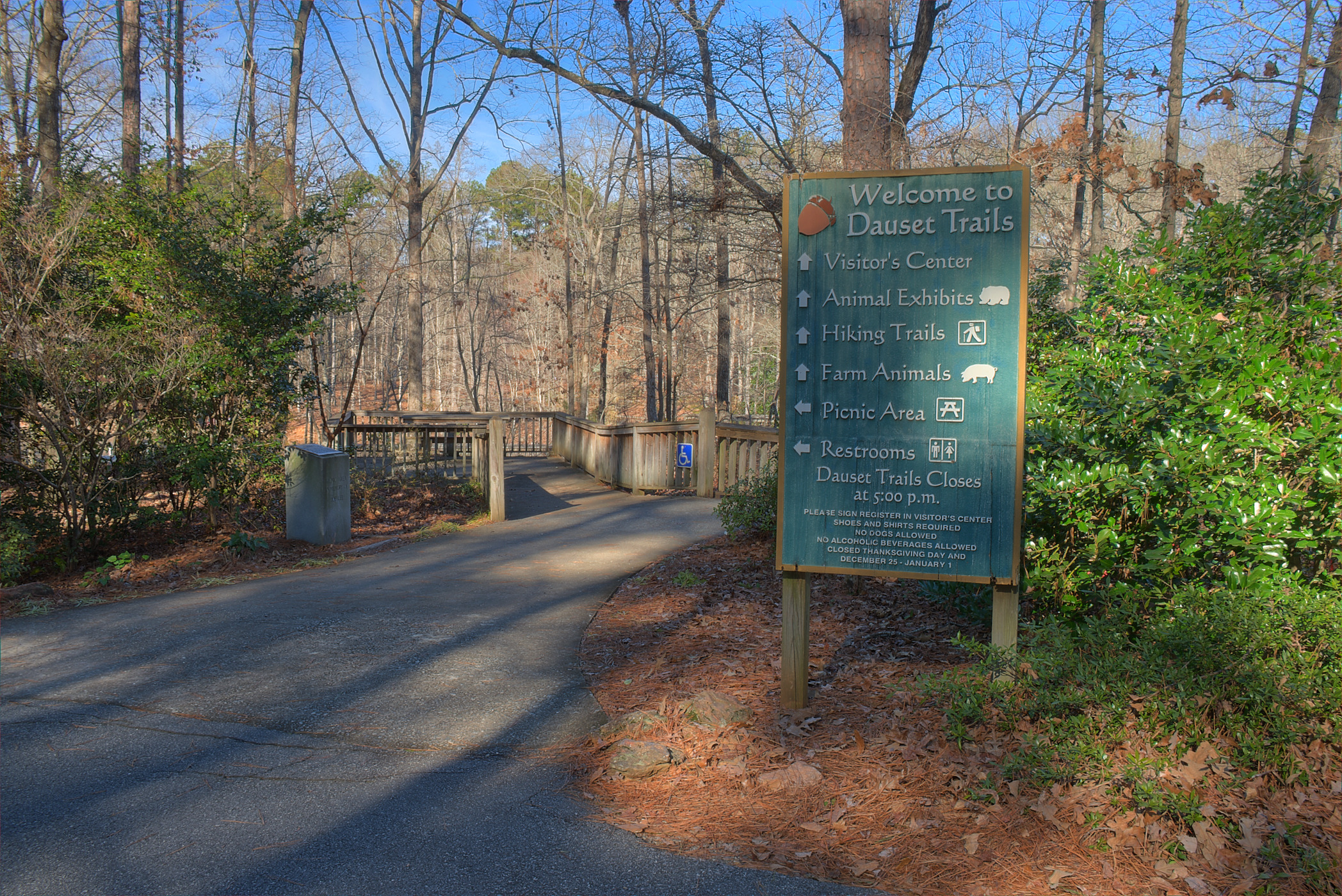

- Location within Georgia
- Location: Butts County, Georgia, USA
- Nearest city: Jackson, Georgia
- Coordinates: 33.233878°N 83.944392°W
- Area: 1,400 acres (5.67 km^{2}; 2.19 sq mi)
- Established: 1977
- Website: dausettrails.com

Dauset Trails Nature Center is a private, non-profit nature center located near Jackson, Georgia, United States. The nature center is open year-round, except for certain holidays.

Dauset Trails Nature Center’s stated mission is "to provide quality environmental education, outdoor recreation, and an understanding of early farm life through close and intimate contact with Georgia’s preserved flora and fauna."

== Features ==
=== Trails ===
- 30 miles of mountain bike and hiking trails with beginner-, intermediate- and advanced-level paths. One of the trails leads to Indian Springs State Park. In 2021 an additional trail system called "The Creeks" was added connecting Dauset Trails with Jackson, GA.
- 5.5 mile loop Equestrian Trail
- Woodland Garden Trail
- Tree Identification Trail

=== Animal Exhibits ===
- An Animal Trail exhibiting more than a dozen animals from bobcats to otters that have been rescued or rehabilitated and cannot be released into the wild.
- A 19th century-style farm exhibit with goats, pigs, cows, a mule, donkey and chickens.
- The "Wonder Room" section of the Visitor Center contains live reptiles native to Georgia.
- The Official Georgia Groundhog General Beauregard Lee, who has resided at Dauset Trails since January 2018.

== Images ==
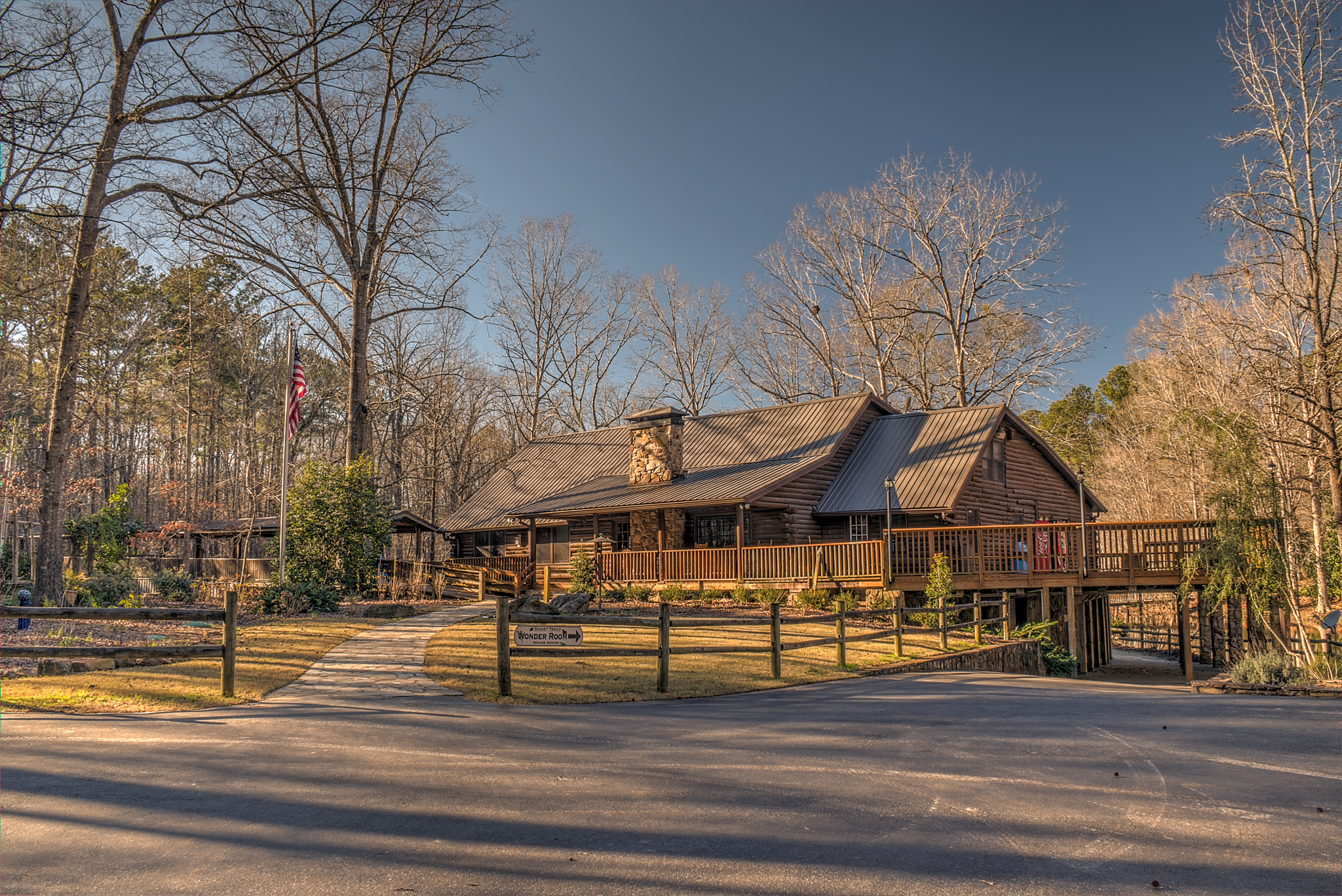
Visitor Center

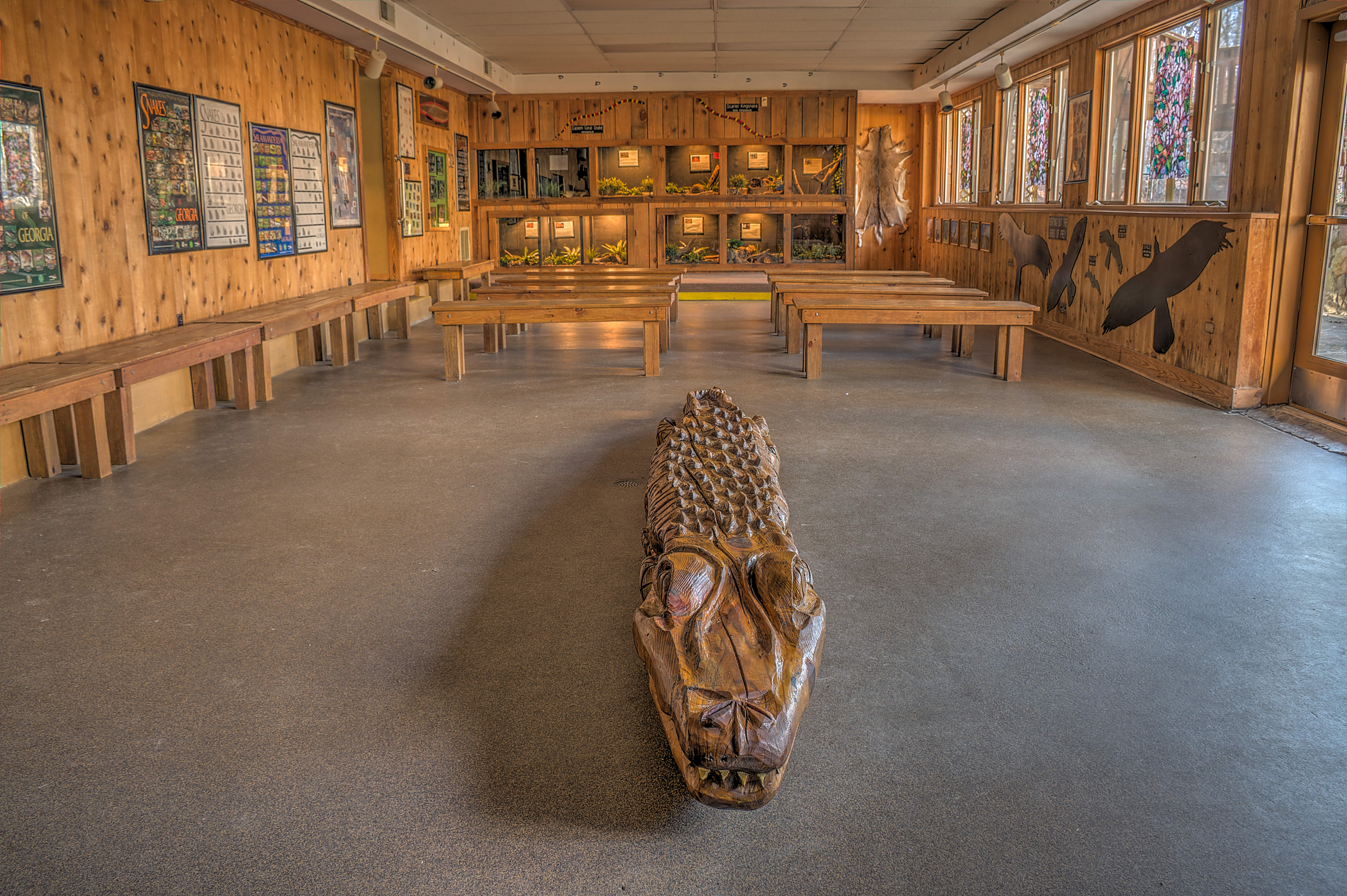
Wonder Room

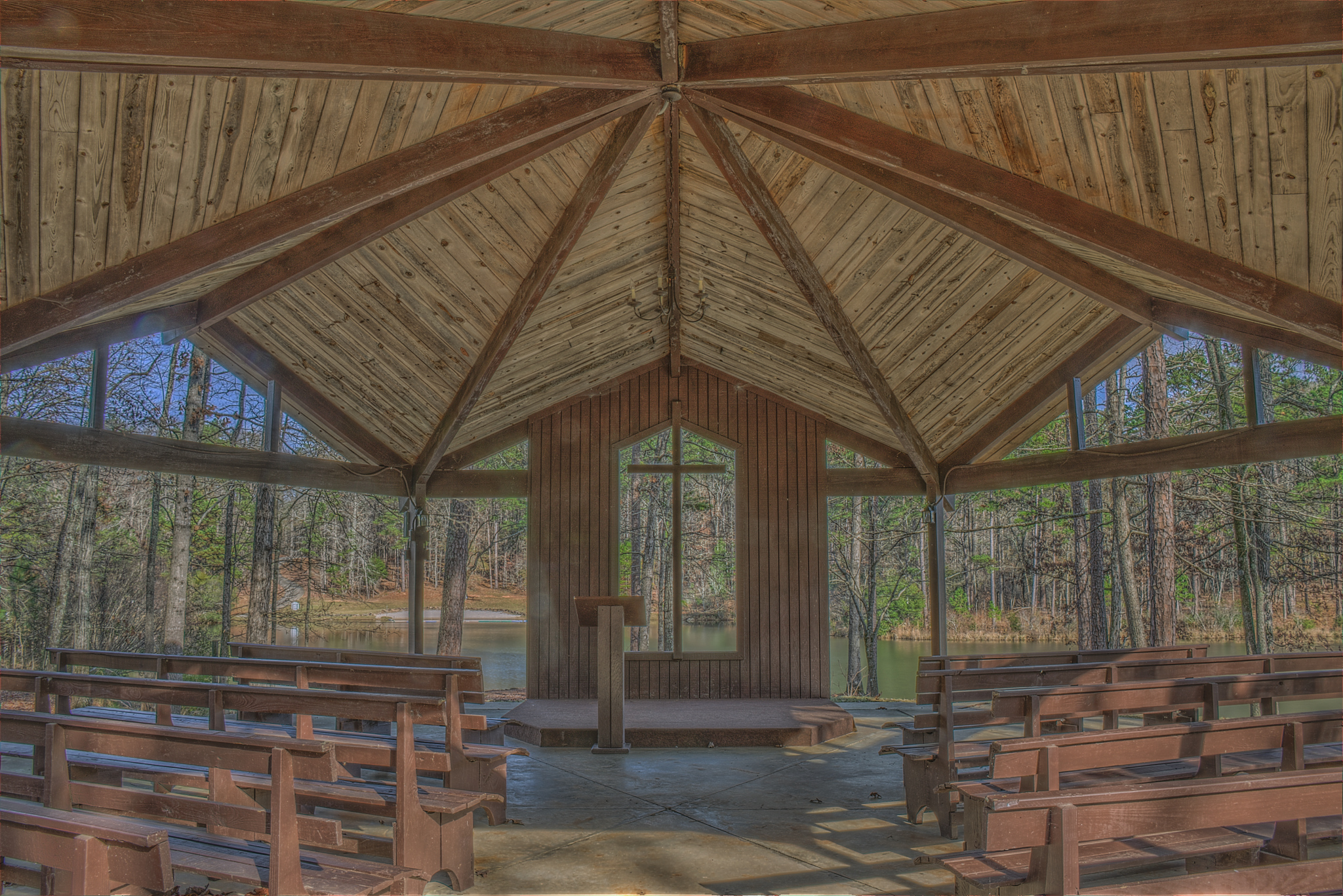
Chapel

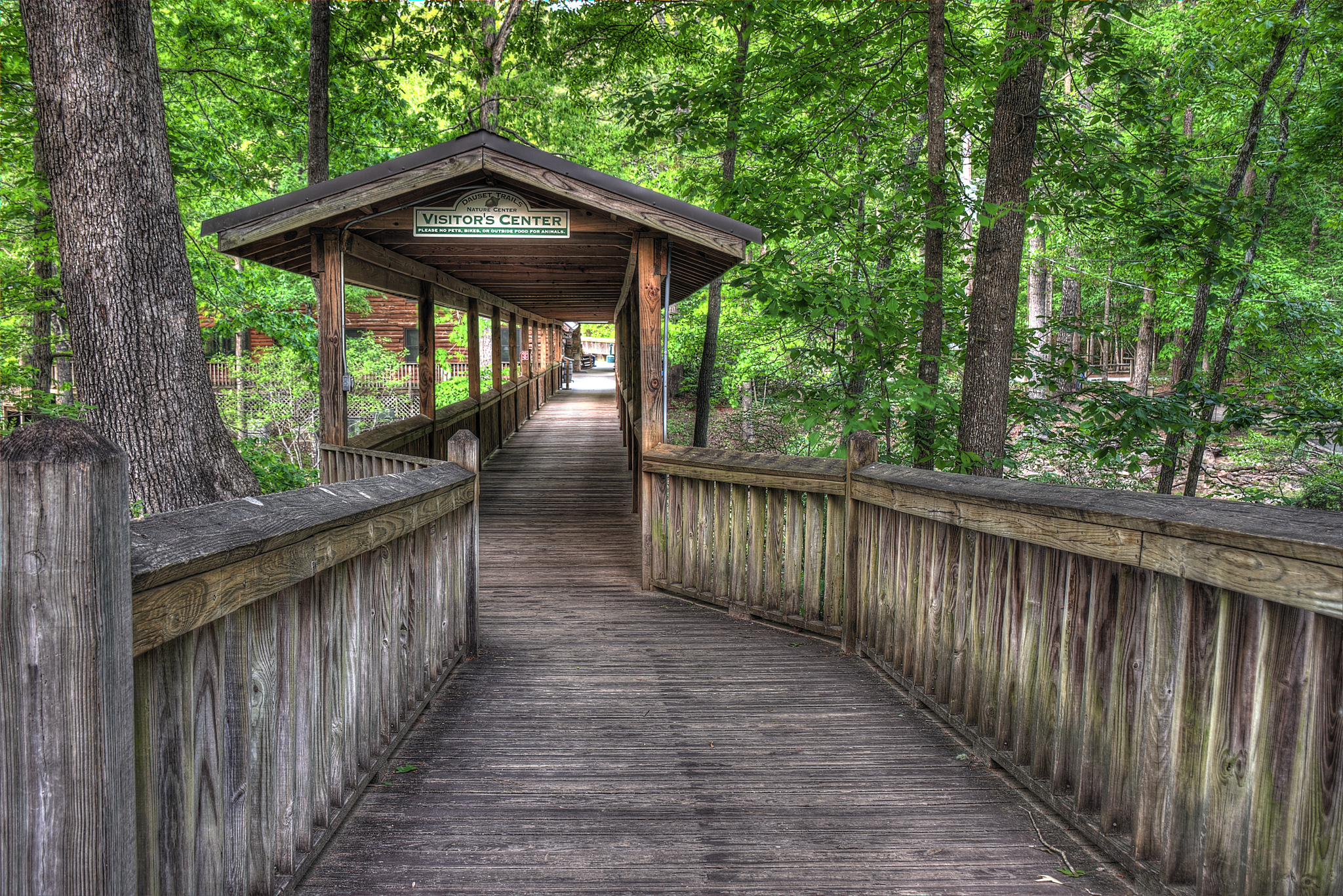
Bridge to Visitor Center

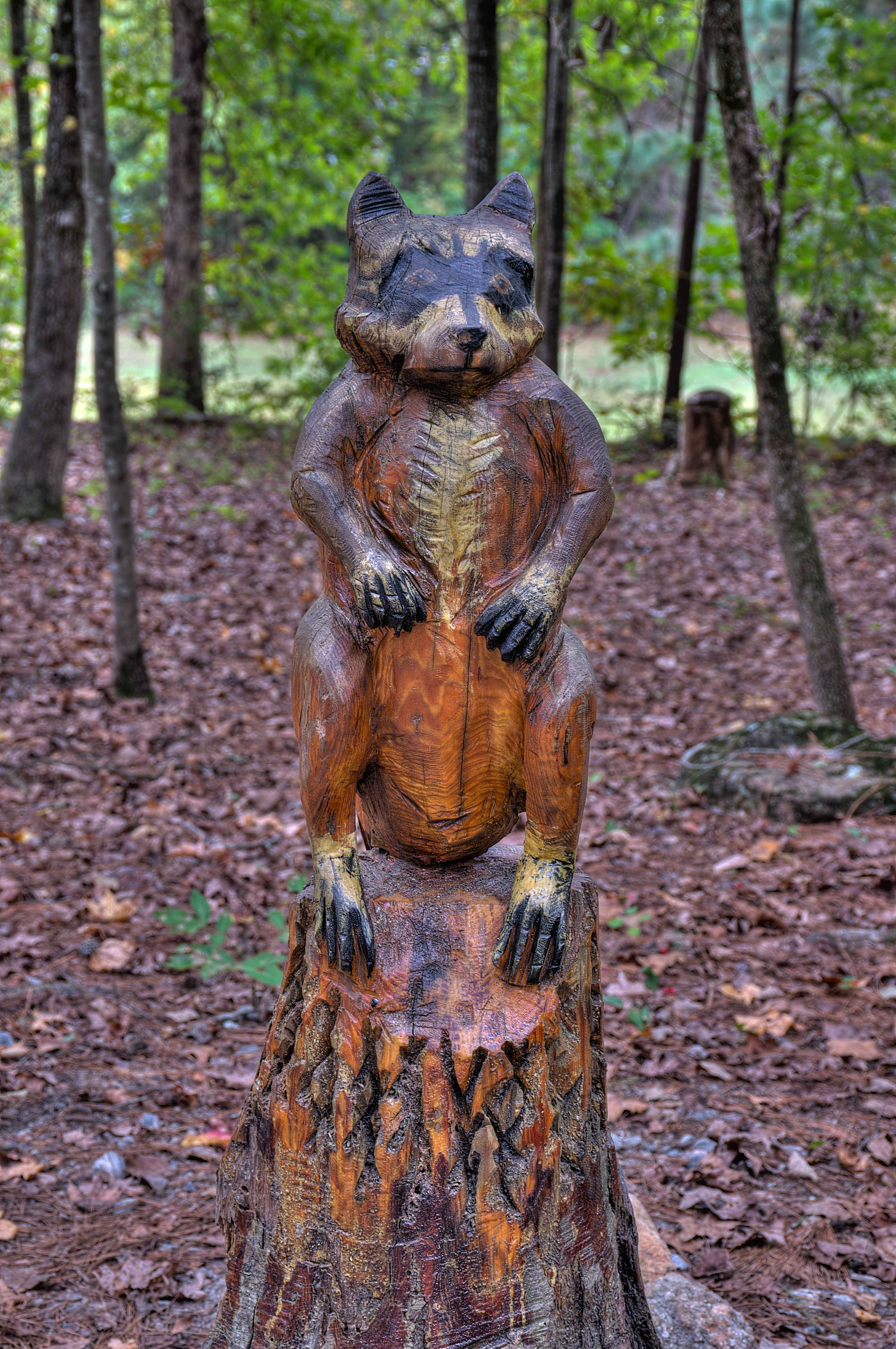
Raccoon Carving

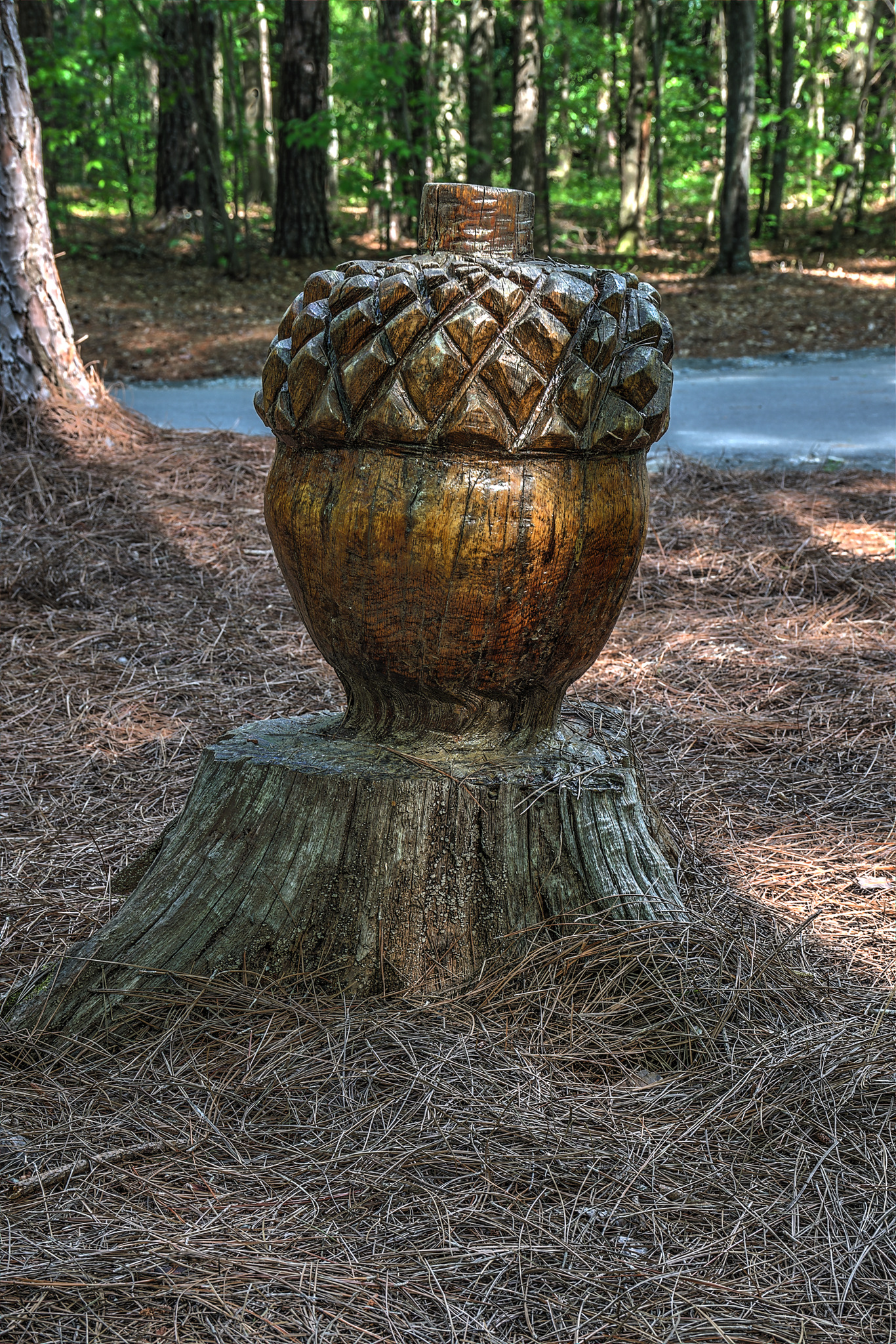
Acorn Carving

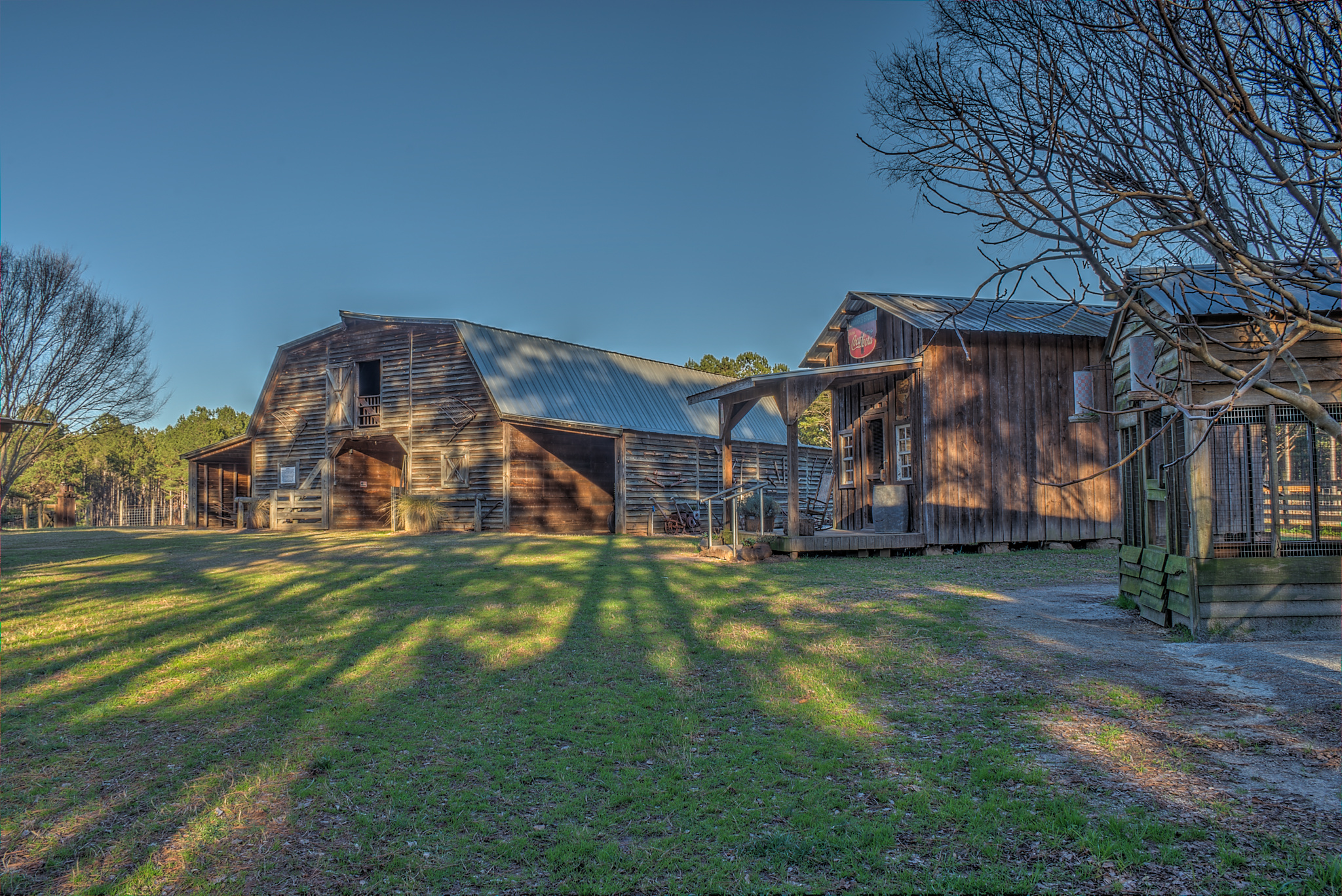
Barnyard Exhibit

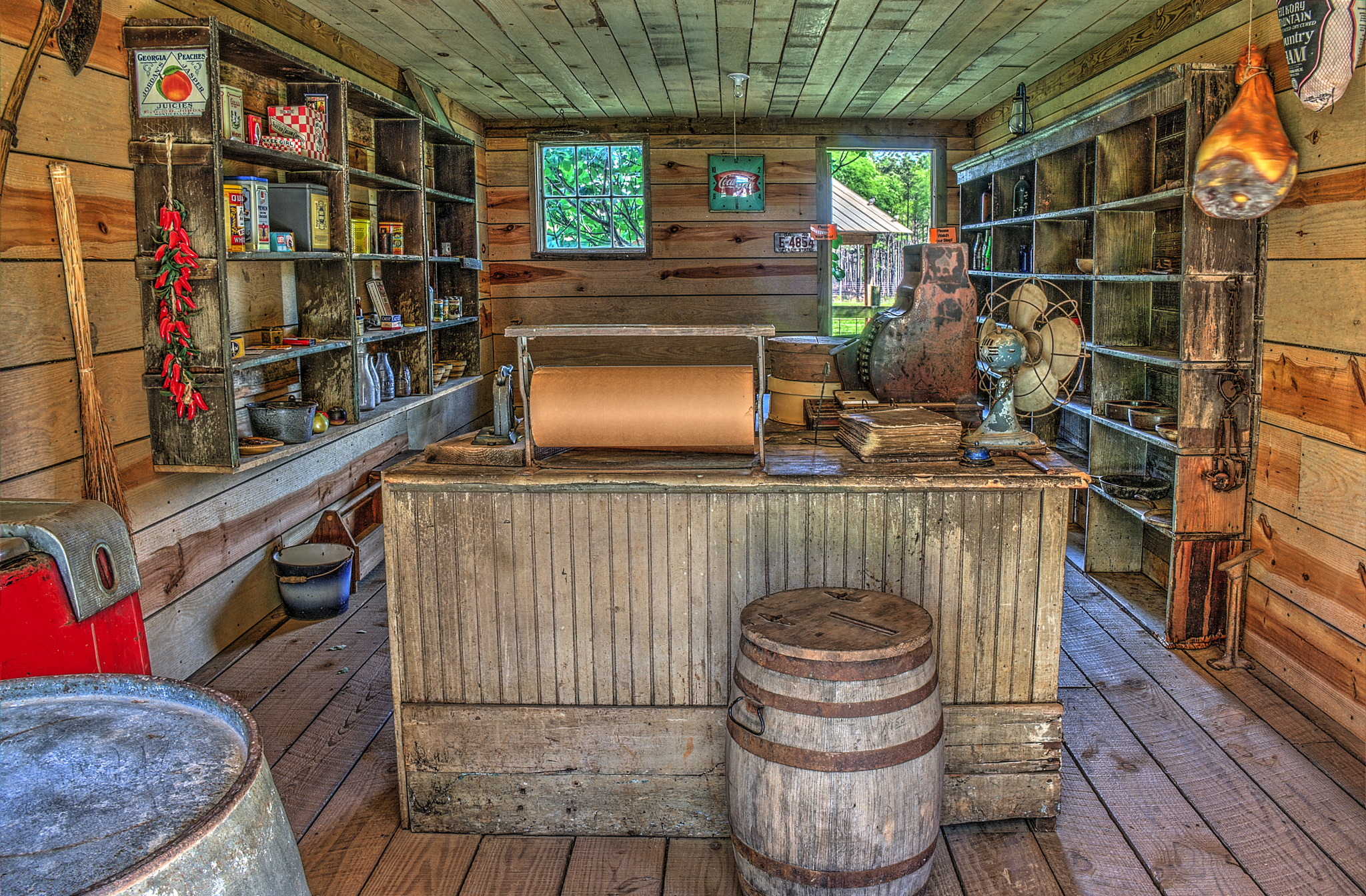
Country Store

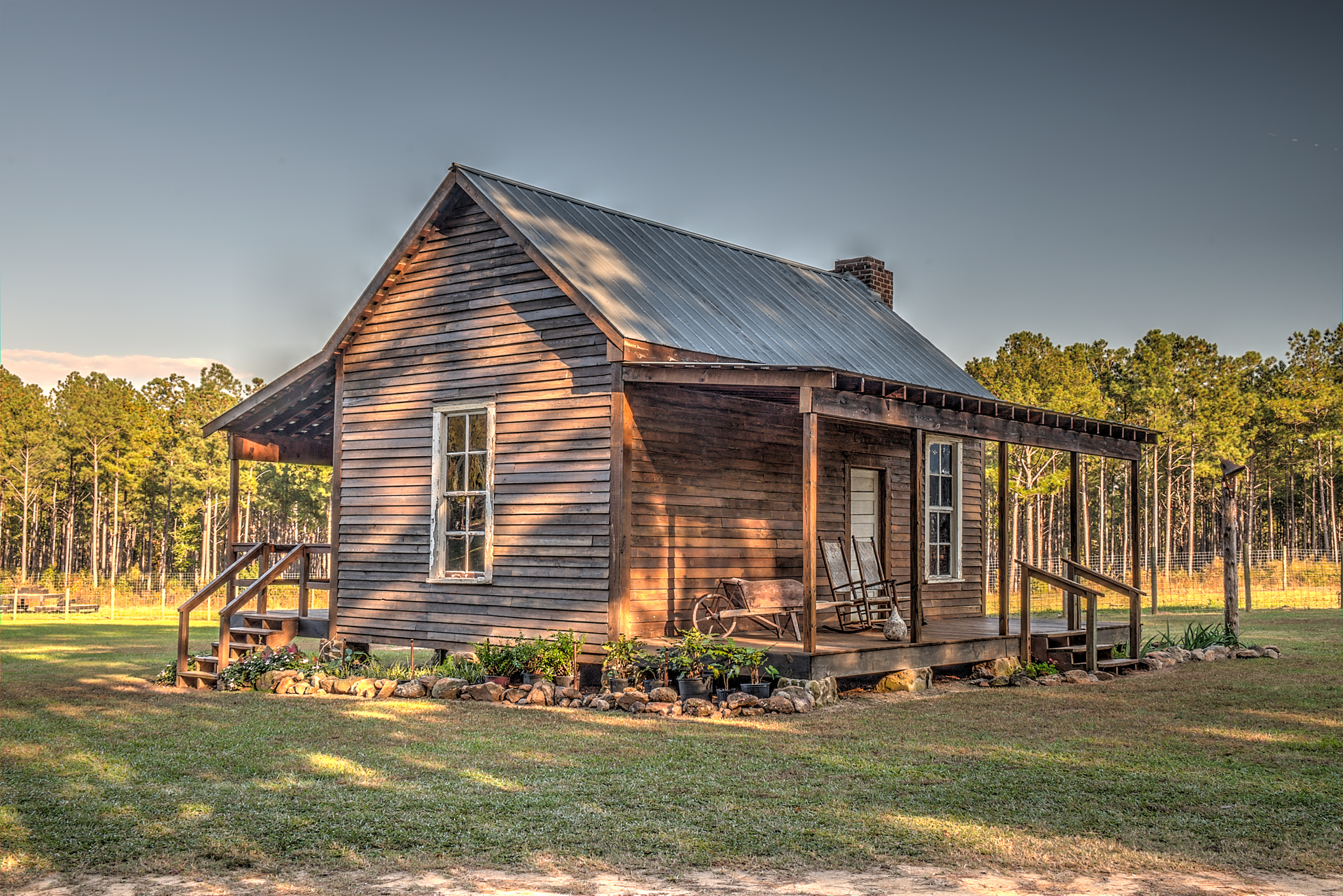
Tenant House

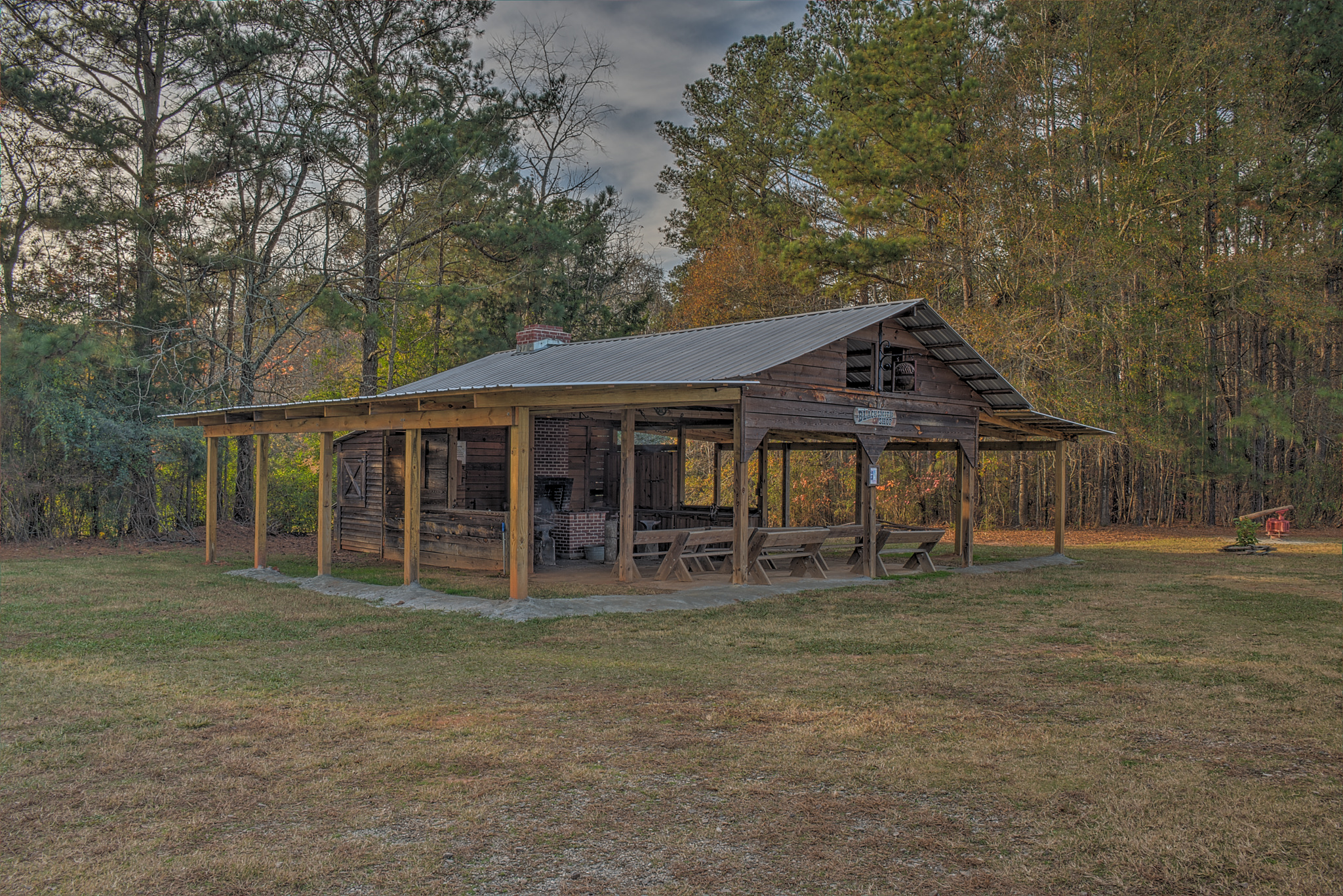
Blacksmith Shop

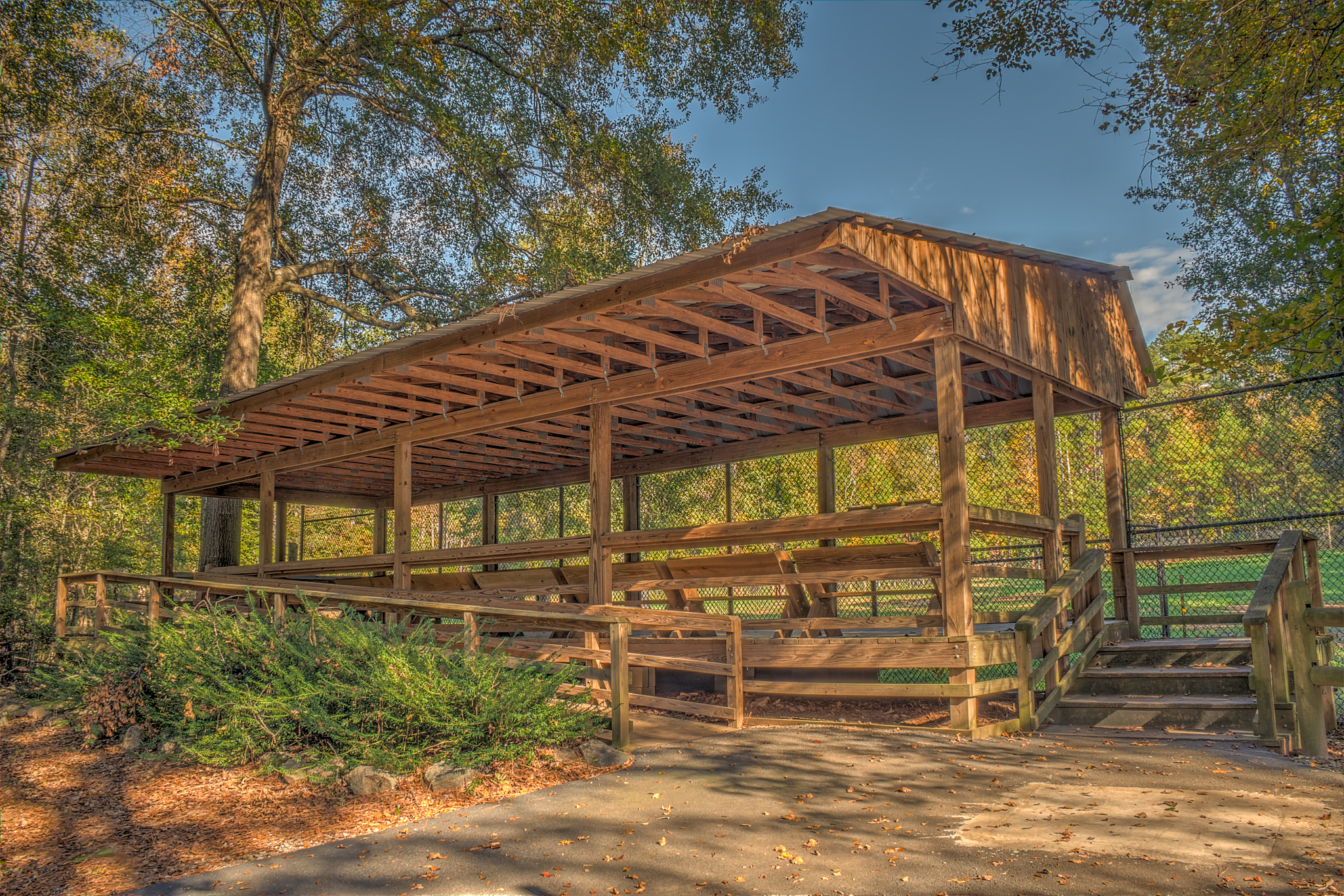
Bison Overlook

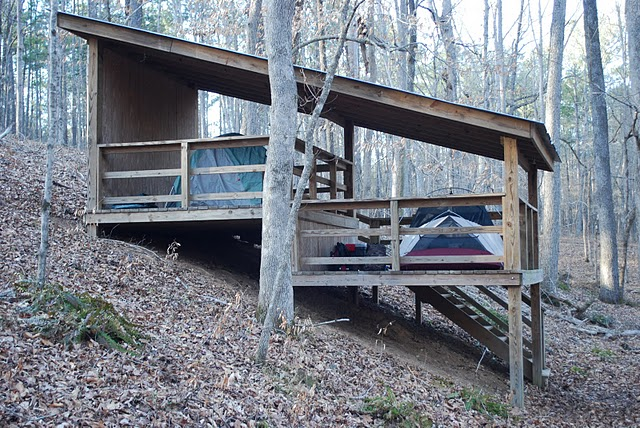
One of the turkey roosts

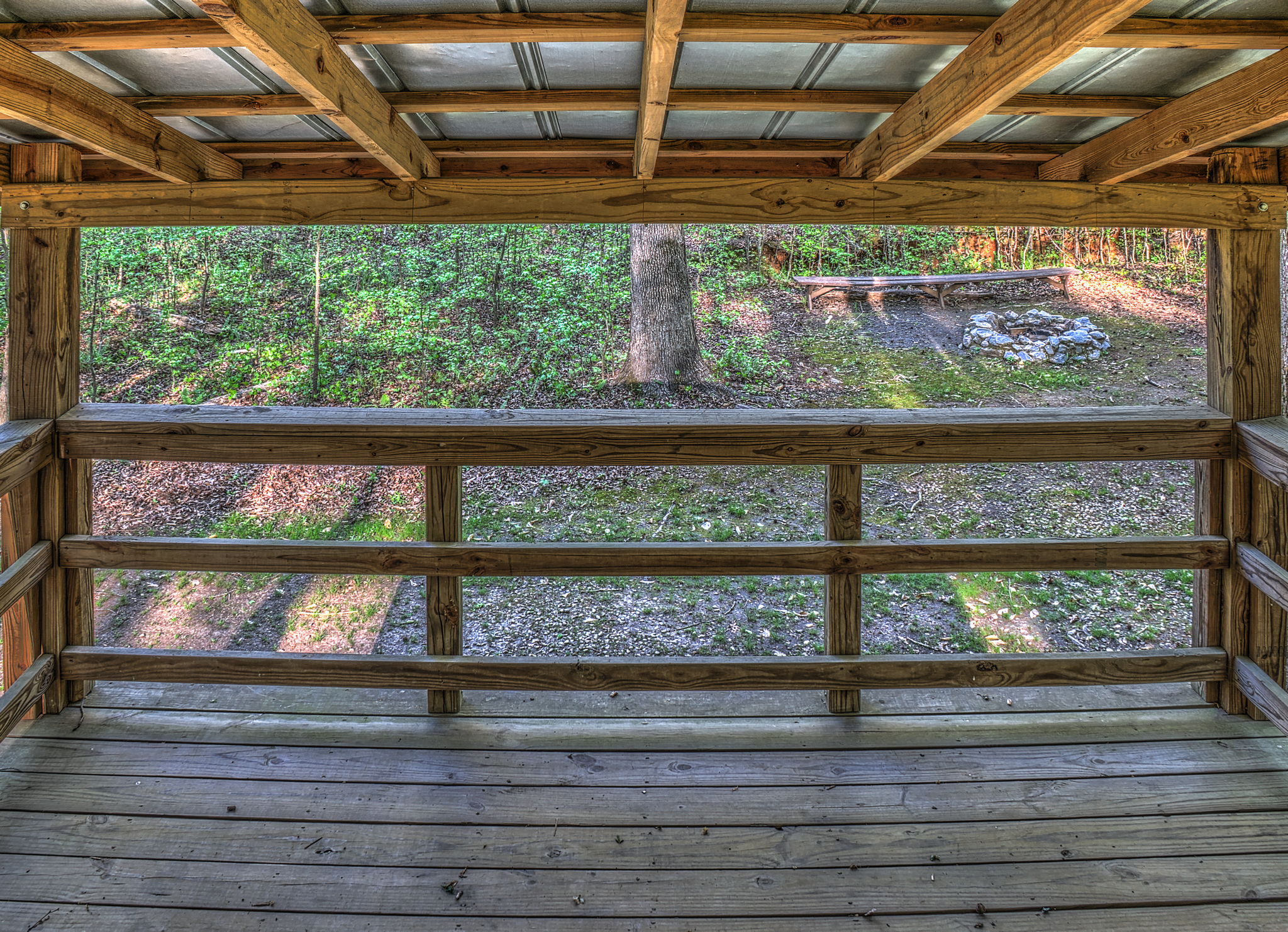
Detail of Turkey Roost

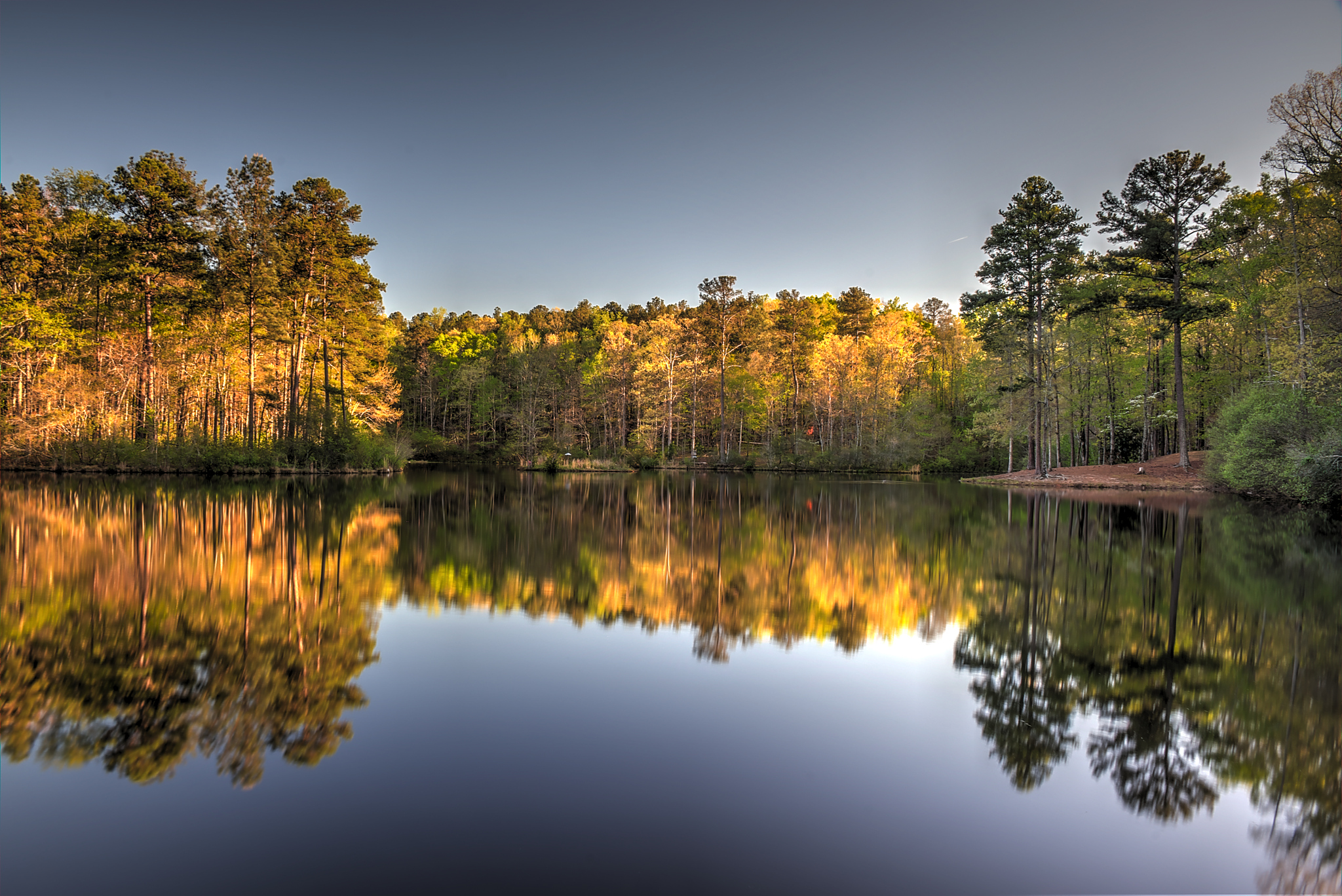
Hamp's Pond
