= 2023 in Canada =

- Decades: 2000s; 2010s; 2020s
- See also: History of Canada; Timeline of Canadian history; List of years in Canada

Events from the year 2023 in Canada.

== Incumbents ==
=== The Crown ===
- Monarch – Charles III

=== Federal government ===
- Governor General – Mary Simon
- Prime Minister – Justin Trudeau
- Parliament – 44th

=== Provincial governments ===
==== Lieutenant Governors ====
- Lieutenant Governor of Alberta – Salma Lakhani
- Lieutenant Governor of British Columbia – Janet Austin
- Lieutenant Governor of Manitoba – Anita Neville
- Lieutenant Governor of New Brunswick – Brenda Murphy
- Lieutenant Governor of Newfoundland and Labrador – Judy Foote (until November 14); then Joan Marie Aylward
- Lieutenant Governor of Nova Scotia – Arthur LeBlanc
- Lieutenant Governor of Ontario – Elizabeth Dowdeswell (until November 14); then Edith Dumont
- Lieutenant Governor of Prince Edward Island – Antoinette Perry
- Lieutenant Governor of Quebec – J. Michel Doyon
- Lieutenant Governor of Saskatchewan – Russell Mirasty

==== Premiers ====
- Premier of Alberta – Danielle Smith
- Premier of British Columbia – David Eby
- Premier of Manitoba – Heather Stefanson (until October 18); then Wab Kinew
- Premier of New Brunswick – Blaine Higgs
- Premier of Newfoundland and Labrador – Andrew Furey
- Premier of Nova Scotia – Tim Houston
- Premier of Ontario – Doug Ford
- Premier of Prince Edward Island – Dennis King
- Premier of Quebec – François Legault
- Premier of Saskatchewan – Scott Moe

=== Territorial governments ===
==== Commissioners ====
- Commissioner of Northwest Territories – Margaret Thom
- Commissioner of Nunavut – Eva Aariak
- Commissioner of Yukon – Angélique Bernard (until May 31); then Adeline Webber

==== Premiers ====
- Premier of Northwest Territories – Caroline Cochrane (until December 8); then R.J. Simpson
- Premier of Nunavut – P.J. Akeeagok
- Premier of Yukon – Sandy Silver (until January 14); then Ranj Pillai

== Events ==
=== January ===
- January 1 – Canada enacts a law prohibiting foreigners, except for immigrants and permanent residents, from acquiring residential areas in the country for two years in response to a real-estate bubble.
- January 10 – CF Montréal Reserve sacks Sandro Grande as head coach, after backlash over comments Grande made on Twitter following the attempted assassination of Quebec premier Pauline Marois.
- January 18 – Defence Minister Anita Anand announces that the country is donating 200 Senator APCs to Ukraine to aid them during the war.
- January 21 – The government agreed to pay CA$2.8 billion to settle a class-action lawsuit regarding compensation for the effects of residential schools to First Nations.
- January 26:
  - Anand announces that Canada is sending four Leopard 2A4 tanks to Ukraine, the first Canadian tanks sent to the country. This move comes a day after Germany and the United States reversed their initial hesitations and announced a shipment of tanks to Ukraine as well.
  - Prime Minister Justin Trudeau appointed Amira Elghawaby as Canada's first special representative on combatting Islamophobia for a four-year term. Her appointment was not only criticized by the Quebec government and the Parti Québécois, but they also called for her to resign due to remarks she said about Quebecers in 2019.

=== February ===
- February 2 – In response to a detected Chinese balloon flying over Canadian and American airspace, Cong Peiwu, the Chinese ambassador to Canada, was summoned by officials, while the Canadian Armed Forces said in a statement that the incident posed no danger to Canadians. The balloon was shot down two days later off the coast of the U.S. state of South Carolina by a missile.
- February 8 – A man crashed a bus into a daycare in Laval, Quebec, killing two children and injuring six others. The man, identified to be 51-year-old Pierre Ny St-Amand, was arrested.
- February 11 – 2023 Yukon high-altitude object: Justin Trudeau orders the takedown of an unidentified object over Yukon, which is later shot down by a United States Air Force F-22 Raptor using a AIM-9X Sidewinder. The Canadian Armed Forces is deployed to collect and analyze the object.
- February 13 – At least twelve people are injured in an explosion at a construction site in Ottawa.
- February 18–March 5 – The 2023 Canada Winter Games are held in Prince Edward Island.
- February 27–March 5 – The 2023 World Junior Figure Skating Championships are held in Calgary, Alberta.
- February 28 – Canada bans social media platform TikTok from all government-issued devices, citing "an unacceptable level of risk to privacy and security" from the Chinese-owned app.

=== March ===
- March 12: The Parti Québécois PQ held a leadership confidence vote. PQ party leader Paul St-Pierre Plamondon broke a record for the PQ votes of confidence, with 98.51% support.
- March 13:
  - The Juno Awards of 2023 are held in Edmonton, Alberta.
  - Guillaume Cliche-Rivard from Québec solidaire is elected in the 2023 Saint-Henri—Sainte-Anne provincial by-election.
  - A pickup truck hit eleven pedestrians in Amqui, Quebec, killing three and injuring eight. The driver was arrested after attempting to flee the scene.
- March 16 – A fire kills seven people in Old Montreal. The fire prompts a crackdown on illegal short-term housing rentals in Quebec.
- March 26 – Janine Gibson wins the 2023 Green Party of Manitoba leadership election.

=== April ===
- April 3 – The 2023 Prince Edward Island general election is held. The Progressive Conservative Party under Dennis King won a majority government.
- April 5–16 – The 2023 IIHF Women's World Championship is held in Brampton, Ontario.
- April 5
  - 2023 Canada ice storm: Two people are killed and over a million people are without power after an ice storm strikes Ontario and Quebec.
  - Quebec Minister of Education Bernard Drainville announces plans to ban prayer rooms in all provincial public schools.
- April 9 – The 2023 Canadian Ringette Championships are held in Regina, Saskatchewan. National champions are decided in U16, U19, and National Ringette League divisions.
- April 17 – Over $20 million worth of gold and other high-value items are stolen at the Toronto Pearson International Airport.
- April 19–May 3 – 2023 Canadian federal worker strike.
- April 27 – The Online Streaming Act receives royal assent, officially amending the Broadcasting Act and other related acts.
- April 29 – The Toronto Maple Leafs win a playoff series for the first time since 2004.

=== May ===
- May 6 – Coronation of Charles III as King of Canada and the other Commonwealth realms.
- May 8 – Canada expels Zhao Wei, a Chinese diplomat based in Toronto, from Canada, after Wei was accused of intimidating a Canadian opposition legislator critical of Beijing. The legislator Wei was accused of intimidating was reported to be Conservative MP Michael Chong. In response to Canada's expulsion of Wei, China listed Jennifer Lynn Lalonde, Canadian Consul in Shanghai, as persona non grata, where she would be expelled by May 13.
- May 9 – Quebec's premier Francois Legault comes out opposed to a plan by Century Initiative lobby group which wants to increase immigration in Canada, saying that "it constitutes a threat to Quebec".
- May 24 – Canada and Saudi Arabia agree to restore full diplomatic relations after a breakdown in relations in 2018 over the assassination of Jamal Khashoggi.
- May 29
  - The 2023 Alberta general election is held, with Danielle Smith and the United Conservative Party retaining a reduced majority government.
  - Paul Bernardo is transferred from Millhaven Institution, a maximum security prison in Ontario, to La Macaza Institution, a medium security prison in Quebec. The transfer caused controversy.

=== June ===
- June 6 – Out-of-control wildfires burn in nearly every single province and territory. By the end of the season, which began early and ended late, 184,493 square kilometres burned in Canada, the equivalent of nearly 1.5 times the size of the Maritime Provinces.
- June 8 – Smoke from several wildfires in Ontario and Québec cause an eery orange sky in New York City sparking "Eh!POCALYPSE NOW" and "BLAME CANADA!" headlines on the cover of the New York Post.
- June 11 – Nick Taylor becomes the first Canadian citizen to win the Canadian Open since 1954.
- June 15 – A vehicle collision between a handi-transit bus and a semi-truck occurs on the Trans-Canada Highway near Carberry, Manitoba, killing 17 seniors and injuring 8 others.
- June 18
  - Titan, a submersible carrying five people, goes missing in the North Atlantic Ocean off the coast of Newfoundland. The submersible imploded, killing everyone in it.
  - Canada reaches the 2023 CONCACAF Nations League final, their first final in a CONCACAF tournament since the 2000 CONCACAF Gold Cup. However, they lose to the United States 2–0.
- June 19 – Federal by-elections are held in:
  - Notre-Dame-de-Grâce—Westmount
  - Oxford
  - Portage—Lisgar
  - Winnipeg South Centre
- June 24 – Provincial by-elections in British Columbia are held in:
  - Langford-Juan de Fuca
  - Vancouver-Mount Pleasant
- June 26 – Olivia Chow wins the 2023 Toronto mayoral by-election, becoming the first visible minority person and the first woman to lead the city post-amalgamation.
- June 28 – A professor and two students are stabbed during a gender issues philosophy class at the University of Waterloo.

=== July ===
- July 2 – A ban on the testing of cosmetic products on animals is imposed by the government.
- July 5 – The Royal Canadian Mounted Police arrests Patrick Gordon Macdonald, the chief propagandist for neo-Nazi group Atomwaffen Division, and charges him on three counts of terrorism.
- July 24 – 2023 Calgary Heritage federal by-election is held.
- July 27: Provincial by-elections in Ontario are held in:
  - Kanata-Carleton
  - Scarborough-Guildwood

=== August ===
- August 23 – Saskatchewan follows New Brunswick's Policy 713 changes and implements a policy that requires parental consent when students under 16 years old wish to change their gender pronouns.

=== September ===
- September 2 – Canadian Indian residential school gravesites: During four weeks over the summer of 2023, the Pine Creek First Nation team sent to the site performed an excavation of some of the anomalies, but found no human remains.
- September 7–17 – 2023 Toronto International Film Festival.
- September 9 – At the Conservative Party of Canada 2023 policy convention, delegates voted 69%-31% to ban under 18 year olds from having gender-affirming care such as surgical interventions.
- September 10 – Canada wins bronze after defeating the United States 127–118 in overtime at the 2023 FIBA Basketball World Cup, their first medal in the event.
- September 14–21 – 2023 Atlantic International Film Festival.
- September 16–24 – 2023 Cinéfest Sudbury International Film Festival.
- September 18 – 2023 India-Canada diplomatic crisis: The Canadian prime minister Justin Trudeau stated that Canadian intelligence has identified a credible link between the Hardeep Singh Nijjar murder and the Indian government and that he had brought this up to his counterpart Narendra Modi at the 2023 G20 New Delhi summit, calling on India to cooperate with Canada in investigating the murder. In response to the alleged killing, the Canadian foreign minister Mélanie Joly ordered the expulsion of a top Indian diplomat in Canada named Pavan Kumar Rai, who headed the operations of the Research and Analysis Wing, India's external intelligence agency, in Canada.
- September 20 – Ford Motor Company and the auto workers union Unifor reach a deal which averts a labor strike. The deal is predicted to influence the resolution of the American United Auto Workers' strike against the big three major American auto makers.
- September 21–October 1 – 2023 Calgary International Film Festival.
- September 22 – Yaroslav Hunka, a Ukrainian-Canadian World War II veteran of the 14th Waffen Grenadier Division of the SS (1st Galician), was in the House of Commons. He had been invited by Anthony Rota, the speaker of the House of Commons. Rota recognized Hunka's presence and praised him. Hunka received a standing ovation. Ukrainian president Volodymyr Zelenskyy was there and took part in the standing ovation. The event was controversial. Within the next several days, Rota apologized and resigned.
- September 28–October 8 – 2023 Vancouver International Film Festival.

=== October ===
- October 2 – 2023 Jean-Talon provincial by-election.
- October 3 – The 2023 Manitoba general election is held, resulting in Wab Kinew and the Manitoba New Democratic Party winning a majority government.
- October 13–15 – The 2023 Progressive Conservative Party of Newfoundland and Labrador leadership election was held. Tony Wakeham is chosen leader, on the second ballot.
- October 19 – Canada withdraws 41 diplomats from India due to India's decision to revoke the diplomats' immunity following the death of Sikh separatist leader Hardeep Singh Nijjar.
- October 29 – In Ottawa, a pro-Palestinian protest is held calling for the Canadian government to help push for a ceasefire to the Gaza war.
- October 31 – Joan Kingston, Rodger Cuzner, Réjean Aucoin, Krista Ann Ross, John M. McNair are appointed to the Senate of Canada.

=== November ===
- November 14 – The 2023 Northwest Territories general election is held.
- November 19 – The 110th Grey Cup in Hamilton, Ontario, was won by the Montreal Alouettes, 28–24, against the Winnipeg Blue Bombers.
- November 21 – The first of a series of province-wide strikes during the 2023 Quebec public sector strikes.
- November 22 – A single car crashed and exploded approaching the Rainbow Bridge border crossing in Niagara Falls, New York, killing its two occupants. Canada–United States border and related security was briefly heightened. Contrary to some initial public concerns about terrorism, investigation soon determined the likely cause was driver recklessness.

=== December ===
- December 2 – Bonnie Crombie wins the 2023 Ontario Liberal Party leadership election.
- December 7 – Cindy Woodhouse is elected as national chief of the Assembly of First Nations (AFN).
- December 28 – Mary Simon announces 78 new appointments to the Order of Canada.

== Deaths ==
=== January ===
- January 1 – Bobby Rivard, ice hockey player (b. 1939)
- January 5
  - Martin Fabi, Hungarian-born football player (b. 1942)
  - Michael Snow, filmmaker and artist (b. 1928)
- January 8 – Harold Martens, rancher, farmer, and politician (b. 1941)
- January 9 – George S. Zimbel, American-Canadian documentary photographer (b. 1929)
- January 12
  - Robbie Bachman, drummer (b. 1953)
  - Mike Cardinal, member of the Legislative Assembly of Alberta (b. 1941)
- January 13 – Peter W. Hutchins, lawyer (b. 1945)
- January 14 – David Onley, broadcaster, author, and the 28th lieutenant governor of Ontario (b. 1950)
- January 15 – Gino Odjick, ice hockey player (b. 1970)
- January 16
  - Ann Thomas Callahan, nurse (b. 1935)
  - Alan Glass, multidisciplinary artist and teacher (b. 1932)
- January 17
  - Leon Dubinsky, actor, theatre director, and composer (b. 1950)
  - Robert Simmonds, police officer and commissioner of the Royal Canadian Mounted Police (b. 1926)
- January 18 – William Frank, politician (b. 1923)
- January 19 – Illya Woloshyn, actor (b. 1979)
- January 20 – Marvin Nash, Olympic sprinter (b. 1953)
- January 21
  - David Howard, Olympic sailor (b. 1918)
  - René Laurin, politician (b. 1940)
- January 25
  - Noah Cowan, executive director of SFFILM and artistic director of TIFF Bell Lightbox (b. 1967)
  - Pamela Anne Gordon, model (b. 1943)
- January 27
  - Bob Chrystal, ice hockey player (b. 1930)
  - David Rimmer, filmmaker (b. 1942)
  - Floyd Sneed, drummer (b. 1942)
- January 28
  - Eva Kushner, Czechoslovak-born academic (b. 1929)
  - Viola Léger, American-born actress and politician (b. 1930)
  - Landon Pearson, politician and children's rights advocate (b. 1930)
- January 29
  - Hazel McCallion, businesswoman, politician, and Mayor of Mississauga (b. 1921)
  - George R. Robertson, actor (b. 1933)
- January 30 – Bobby Hull, ice hockey player (b. 1939)

=== February ===
- February 1 – Terence Dickinson, astrophotographer and amateur astronomer (b. 1943)
- February 2
  - Fred, groundhog whose behaviour was used to predict weather on Groundhog Day (Note: Found dead on this date.)
  - Trevor Boys, race car driver (b. 1957)
  - Lanny Poffo, American-Canadian professional wrestler, motivational speaker, poet, and actor (b. 1954)
- February 5
  - Roslyn Swartzman, printmaker, painter, and sculptor (b. 1931)
  - Kaye Vaughan, American-born football player (b. 1931)
- February 6 – Carole Laganière, documentary filmmaker (b, 1959)
- February 7 – Mendelson Joe, singer-songwriter, guitarist, painter, and political activist (b. 1944)
- February 10 – Ben Steinberg, composer, conductor, and music educator (b. 1930)
- February 12 – Billy Two Rivers, professional wrestler, actor, and chief of the Mohawks of Kahnawà:ke (b. 1935)
- February 13
  - Guido Basso, jazz musician (b. 1937)
  - Nadine Girault, politician (b. 1959)
- February 15 – Paul Jerrard, ice hockey player and coach (b. 1965)
- February 16 – Helen Fogwill Porter, writer, educator, and activist (b. 1930)
- February 17 – Don Blackburn, ice hockey player (b. 1938)
- February 18 – Peter Herrndorf, Dutch-born lawyer and media businessman (b. 1940)
- February 23 – Andrée Desautels, musician, musicologist, and music educator (b. 1923)
- February 25 – Gordon Pinsent, actor (b. 1930)

=== March ===
- March 1 – Wally Fawkes, British-Canadian jazz clarinettist and satirical cartoonist (b. 1924)
- March 6 – Ken Money, astronaut, scientist, and Olympic high jumper (b. 1935)
- March 7 – J. A. W. Gunn, political philosopher (b. 1937)
- March 8 – Richard A. N. Bonnycastle, businessman (b. 1934)
- March 10 – William R. C. Blundell, businessman (b. 1927)
- March 13
  - Terry Grier, politician, lecturer, and university administrator (b. 1936)
  - Glen Weir, football player (b. 1951)
- March 14 – Louisette Dussault, actress and writer (b. 1940)
- March 16
  - Sharon Acker, actress and model (b. 1935)
  - Claude Fournier, filmmaker (b. 1931)
  - Helen Vari, Czechoslovak-born philanthropist (b. 1931)
- March 17 – Pierre Michaud, lawyer and judge (b. 1936)
- March 20
  - Dave Gardner, ice hockey player (b. 1952)
  - Al Horning, politician (b. 1939)
- March 21 – Charles E. Bastien, animation director (b. 1962)
- March 24
  - Bruce Sinclair, politician and Mayor of Etobicoke (b. 1928)
  - Mel Semenko, football player (b. 1937)
  - William D. Coleman, political scientist (b. 1950)
- March 26 – Paul Schmidt, homicide victim (b. 1986 or 1985)
- March 27 – Jocelyn Morlock, composer and music educator (b. 1969)

=== April ===
- April 1
  - Ken Girard, ice hockey player (b. 1936)
  - Red Robinson, disc jockey (b. 1937)
- April 2 – Greg Francis, Olympic basketball player and coach (b. 1974)
- April 8 – Matt Baldwin, curler (b. 1926)
- April 10 – Raymond Sawada, ice hockey player (b. 1985)
- April 11 – Alan Herbert, politician and activist (b. 1944)
- April 14 – Marilyn Ruth Take, figure skater (b. 1928)
- April 19 – Luc Portelance, police officer and civil servant (b. 1960)
- April 22 – Ron Cahute, musician (b. 1955)
- April 24 – Tarek Fatah, Pakistani-Canadian journalist and author (b. 1949)
- April 26 – Michel Biron, politician (b. 1934)
- April 28 – Tim Bachman, musician (b. 1951)

=== May ===
- May 1 – Gordon Lightfoot, musician (b. 1938)
- May 5
  - Bruce McCall, author and illustrator (b. 1935)
  - Brian McKenna, documentary film director (b. 1945)
- May 6 – Marc Lalonde, politician (b. 1929)
- May 7
  - Byrna Barclay, writer and editor (b. 1940)
  - Vic Stasiuk, ice hockey player and coach (b. 1929)
- May 8 – Robert L. Peters, graphic designer and educator (b. 1954)
- May 9 – Eric McCormack, Scottish-born author (b. 1938)
- May 10
  - Mike Feldman, politician (b. 1927)
  - Ian Hacking, philosopher (b. 1936)
- May 12 – Gerry Hart, ice hockey player (b. 1948)
- May 14 – Samantha Weinstein, actress (b. 1995)
- May 15
  - Deborra Hope, journalist, anchor, and producer for CHAN-DT (b. 1955)
  - Ron Northcott, curler (b. 1935)
- May 16
  - Frédéric Bastien, author, historian, and journalist (b. 1969 or 1970)
  - Dorothy Knowles, visual artist (b. 1927)
- May 18 – Albert Bregman, academic and psychologist (b. 1936)
- May 20 – Marv Edwards, ice hockey player (b. 1934)
- May 21 – C. Donald Bateman, electrical engineer and the inventor of the ground proximity warning system (b. 1932)
- May 22 – Daniel Brooks, theatre director, actor, and playwright (b. 1958)
- May 25 – Robert William Bradford, aviation artist (b. 1923)
- May 29 – Michel Côté, actor (b. 1950)
- May 30 – Lou Marcon, ice hockey player (b. 1935)

=== June ===
- June 2
  - Willie Marshall, ice hockey player (b. 1931)
  - Reno Salvail, artist, photographer, and author (b. 1947)
- June 8 – Louis LeBel, jurist (b. 1939)
- June 9 – Floyd Martin, ice hockey player (b. 1929)
- June 10 – Eric Kokish, bridge player, writer, and coach (b. 1947)
- June 11 – Rob Young, sound engineer (b. 1946 or 1947)
- June 15 – Patrick Guzman, Canadian-Filipino actor (b. 1967)
- June 18
  - Sheldon Bergstrom, actor (b. 1971)
  - Hardeep Singh Nijjar, Indian-born activist and advocate for the creation of a separate Sikh state out of India's Punjab region (b. 1977)
- June 22 – Marion Reid, politician and lieutenant governor of Prince Edward Island (b. 1929)
- June 23 – Omer Léger, American-born merchant and politician (b. 1931)
- June 24 – Dahrran Diedrick, Jamaican-born football player (b. 1979)
- June 26 – Tom Beynon, football player (b. 1941)
- June 27 – Daniel N. Paul, Miꞌkmaq elder, author, columnist, and human rights activist (b. 1938)
- June 28
  - Sue Johanson, sex educator, public speaker, and registered nurse (b. 1930)
  - William Marshall, lawyer, judge, and politician (b. 1935)
- June 29 – Stephen Owen, lawyer, administrator, and politician (b. 1948)
- June 30 – Kirk Howard, book publisher and founder and president of Dundurn Press (b. 1942)

=== July ===
- July 1 – Paul David Manson, Canadian Forces officer, fighter pilot, and businessman (b. 1934)
- July 3 – Nicole Demers, politician, MP (b. 1950).
- July 4 – Denise Bombardier, journalist, essayist, novelist, and media personality (b. 1941)
- July 5 – Martin Stevens, pop singer (b. 1953)
- July 6 – Beverley Salmon, activist and politician (b. 1930)
- July 7 – Anne Klinck, British-born academic and writer (b. 1943)
- July 8 – Gordon Reid, businessman and the founder of Giant Tiger (b. 1933)
- July 9
  - Michel Dupuy, French-born diplomat, journalist, academic, and politician (b. 1930)
  - Mel Wakabayashi, Canadian-Japanese ice hockey player (b. 1943)
- July 12 – Daniel Goldberg, film producer and screenwriter (b. 1949)
- July 14 – Gerda Hnatyshyn, viceregal consort of Canada (b. 1935)
- July 15
  - Billy MacMillan, ice hockey player and coach (b. 1943)
  - Lew Morrison, ice hockey player (b. 1948)
- July 21
  - Monte Kwinter, politician (b. 1931)
  - Brian O'Neill, sports executive (b. 1929)
- July 23 – Howard Adelman, philosopher and university professor (b. 1938)
- July 25
  - Pat Carney, politician (b. 1935)
  - Joe Kowal, ice hockey player (b. 1956)
- July 27 – Pierre Collin, actor (b. 1938)
- July 29 – Danny Grossman, dancer and choreographer (b. 1942)

=== August ===
- August 3 – Bob Murdoch, ice hockey player and coach (b. 1946)
- August 4 – Arthur Mauro, lawyer and businessman (b. 1927)
- August 5 – Gilles Gilbert, ice hockey player (b. 1949)
- August 7 – Zenon Andrusyshyn, German-Canadian football player (b. 1947)
- August 9
  - Robbie Robertson, musician (b. 1943)
  - Hugh Segal, political strategist, author, commentator, academic, and senator (b. 1950)
- August 11 – Chris Axworthy, English-born politician and academic (b. 1947)
- August 13 – Rachel Laurin, organist, composer, and music educator (b. 1961)
- August 14
  - James Bartleman, diplomat, author, lieutenant governor of Ontario, and chancellor of OCAD University (b. 1939)
  - Bobby Baun, ice hockey player (b. 1936)
- August 17 – Rick Jeanneret, television and radio personality (b. 1942)
- August 20
  - Isabel Crook, British-Canadian anthropologist, political prisoner, and professor at Beijing Foreign Studies University (b. 1915)
  - Bobby Taylor, English-born football player (b. 1939)
- August 22 – Alexandra Paul, competitive ice dancer (b. 1991)
- August 24 – Keith Spicer, academic, public servant, journalist, and writer (b. 1934)
- August 26 – Yvon Pedneault, sports journalist and television and radio broadcaster (b. 1946)
- August 27 – Doug Kyle, long-distance runner (b. 1932)

=== September ===
- September 1
  - Charles Joseph Knight, Surgeon General (b. 1931)
  - Raymond Moriyama, architect (b. 1929)
- September 2 – Adrien Ouellette, politician (b. 1940)
- September 3 – Brad Maxwell, ice hockey player (b. 1957)
- September 4 – Alex McIntosh, politician (b. 1934)
- September 5
  - Pierre Camu, geographer, civil servant, academic, and transport executive (b. 1923)
  - Adam Exner, bishop of the Catholic Church (b. 1928)
  - Bruce Guthro, musician (b. 1961)
  - Richard Laviolette, musician (b. 1982)
- September 6 – John Winston Foran, politician and police officer (b. 1952)
- September 7 – Peter C. Newman, Austrian-born journalist, editor, and author (b. 1929)
- September 8 – Monique Bégin, academic and politician (b. 1936)
- September 10 – Lloyd Hines, politician (b. 1951)
- September 11
  - Bruce Stavert, Anglican prelate (b. 1940)
  - Endel Tulving, Estonian-born experimental psychologist and cognitive neuroscientist (b. 1927)
- September 15 – Claude Cormier, landscape architect (b. 1960)
- September 17 – Emile Duprée, professional wrestler and promoter (b. 1936)
- September 20 – Renée Hudon, radio-television journalist and academic (b. 1942)
- September 22
  - Stan Klees, music industry businessman (b. 1932)
  - Selwyn Romilly, Trinbagonian-born judge (b. 1939 or 1940)
- September 23 – John S. Saul, political economist and activist (b. 1938)
- September 26 – Raynald Blais, politician (b. 1954)
- September 28 – Eric Hammill, farmer and politician (b. 1932)
- September 29 – Roy Boudreau, teacher and politician (b. 1946)
- September 30 – Chris Snow, ice hockey executive (b. 1981)

=== October ===
- October 2
  - Mel Fitzgerald, Paralympic athlete (b. 1953)
  - Gord Wilson, ice hockey player (b. 1932)
- October 5 – Jon Beare, rower (b. 1974)
- October 6 – Bev Bentley, ice hockey player (b. 1927)
- October 7 – Vivian Silver, Canadian-Israeli peace activist and women's rights activist (b. 1949)
- October 8 – Maude Jacques, Paralympic wheelchair basketball player (b. 1992)
- October 10 – James Lee, politician and 26th premier of Prince Edward Island (b. 1937)
- October 13
  - Michel Lapierre, writer and journalist (b. 1953)
  - Hubert Reeves, astrophysicist and popularizer of science (b. 1932)
  - Glorianne Stromberg, commissioner of the Ontario Securities Commission and securities lawyer (b. 1939)
- October 14 – Roméo Savoie, artist (b. 1928)
- October 15 – Jim Larkin, politician and businessman (b. 1946)
- October 17 – George Baird, architect, scholar, and architectural educator (b. 1939)
- October 19 – Moe Amery, Lebanese-born politician (b. 1954)
- October 21
  - Corby Adams, ice hockey player (b. 1940)
  - Natalie Zemon Davis, Canadian-American historian (b. 1928)
- October 23 – Yves Beaumier, educator and politician (b. 1942)
- October 24 – Mike Lashuk, football player (b. 1938)
- October 25
  - Elizabeth Gray, radio broadcaster (b. 1937 or 1936)
  - Ed Sandford, ice hockey player (b. 1928)
  - Ian Shugart, politician, professor, and public servant (b. 1957)
- October 26 – Hélène Alarie, politician (b. 1941)
- October 27 – Denis Carufel, ice hockey player (b. 1954)
- October 28
  - Matthew Perry, Canadian-American actor (b. 1969)
  - Arthur Britton Smith, philanthropist, businessperson, historical writer, lawyer, and war veteran (b. 1920)
- October 30 – Barry McKinnon, poet (b. 1944)
- October 31 – Fabien Roy, politician (b. 1928)

=== November ===
- November 1 – Gerry Wiedel, German-born fencer (b. 1933)
- November 3 – Ian Ferrier, poet, musician, and choreographer (b. 1954)
- November 4 – Gord Smith, artist (b. 1937)
- November 5 – Donald Shebib, film and television director (b. 1938)
- November 6 – Sandy McGregor, ice hockey player (b. 1939)
- November 7 – Garfield McMahon, sports shooter (b. 1932)
- November 8
  - Peter Elzinga, politician (b. 1944)
  - Bernard Lemaire, businessman (b. 1936)
- November 9 – David Gauthier, philosopher (b. 1932)
- November 10 – Gordon Gibson, political columnist, author, and politician (b. 1937)
- November 11
  - Ron Anton, curler (b. 1941)
  - Peter J. Moore, music producer (b. 1956)
- November 15 – Karl Tremblay, lead singer of Les Cowboys Fringants (b. 1976)
- November 17 – Gregory Woolley, Haitian-born criminal associated with the Hells Angels (b. 1972)
- November 18 – Jerome Markson, architect (b. 1929)
- November 19 – Marcel Lessard, politician (b. 1926)
- November 21 – Chad Allan, founding member and original lead singer of The Guess Who (b. 1943)
- November 22 – Émile Martel, diplomat and writer (b. 1941)
- November 24 – George Cohon, American-born businessman and lawyer (b. 1937)
- November 25
  - Marty Krofft, television creator and puppeteer (b. 1937)
  - Alex J. Walling, sports analyst and broadcaster (b. 1946)
- November 26
  - Norris McDonald, journalist and member of the Canadian Motorsport Hall of Fame (b. 1942)
  - Don Tannas, politician (b. 1938)
- November 27 – Helen Lucas, artist (b. 1931)
- November 29 – Darcy McKeough, politician (b. 1933)

=== December ===
- December 1
  - Joanne Hewson, alpine skier (b. 1930)
  - Daniel Langlois, film director and animation software entrepreneur (b. 1957)
  - Charles Officer, film and television director, writer, and actor (b. 1975)
- December 3 – Myles Goodwyn, lead singer, guitarist, and principal songwriter of April Wine (b. 1948)
- December 4 – Gerald Comeau, politician (b. 1946)
- December 5 – John Rumble, equestrian (b. 1933)
- December 6 – Noël Kinsella, politician and Speaker of the Senate of Canada (b. 1939)
- December 7 – Alan Longhurst, British-born oceanographer (b. 1925)
- December 8 – David Gell, radio DJ and television presenter (b. 1929)
- December 9
  - Hartland Monahan, ice hockey player (b. 1951)
  - Mike Urquhart, ice hockey player, coach, and general manager (b. 1958)
- December 11 – Alain Chartrand, film director and screenwriter (b. 1946)
- December 13
  - Gene Carr, ice hockey player (b. 1951)
  - Peter Godsoe, businessman and CEO of Scotiabank (b. 1938)
- December 14
  - Qapik Attagutsiak, Inuk World War II contributor (b. 1920)
  - Ken MacKenzie, baseball player (b. 1934)
- December 17 – Gurdev Singh Gill, Indian-born physician, community leader, and activist (b. 1931)
- December 18 – John Godfrey, educator, journalist, and politician (b. 1942)
- December 21 – Roger Pomerleau, politician and carpenter (b. 1947)
- December 22 – Andy Brandt, politician (b. 1938)
- December 24
  - Harry Rosen, menswear mogul (b. 1931)
  - Reggie Savage, ice hockey player (b. 1970)
- December 27 – Bob Panasik, golfer (b. 1941)
- December 31 – Dale Hodges, politician (b. 1941)

== See also ==
- 2023 Canadian electoral calendar
- 2023 in Canadian soccer
- 2023 in Canadian music
- 2023 in Canadian television
