= List of hospitals in Quebec =

Following is a list of hospitals within the province of Quebec, Canada.

== Bas-Saint-Laurent ==
Health and social services in this region are covered by the Centre intégré de santé et de services sociaux du Bas-Saint-Laurent (CISSS du Bas-Saint-Laurent). There are currently seven hospitals in the Bas-Saint-Laurent region:

- Hôpital régional de Rimouski (Rimouski, Quebec)
- Centre hospitalier Trois-Pistoles (Trois-Pistoles, Quebec)
- Hôpital d'Amqui (Amqui)
- Hôpital Notre-Dame-de-Fatima (La Pocatière)
- Hôpital de Matane (Matane)
- Centre hospitalier régional du Grand-Portage (Rivière-du-Loup)
- Hôpital de Notre-Dame-du-Lac (Témiscouata-sur-le-Lac)
- Centre hospitalier de la Mitis (Mont-Joli)

== Saguenay–Lac-Saint-Jean ==
Health and social services in this region are covered by the Centre intégré universitaire de santé et de services sociaux du Saguenay–Lac-Saint-Jean (CIUSSS du Saguenay–Lac-Saint-Jean). There are currently six hospitals in the Saguenay–Lac-Saint-Jean region:

- Hôpital de Dolbeau-Mistassini (Dolbeau-Mistassini)
- Hôpital de Jonquière (Jonquière)
- Hôpital de Roberval (Roberval, Quebec)
- Hôpital de Chicoutimi (Chicoutimi)
- Hôpital d'Alma (Alma, Quebec)
- Hôpital de La Baie (La Baie)

== Capitale-Nationale ==
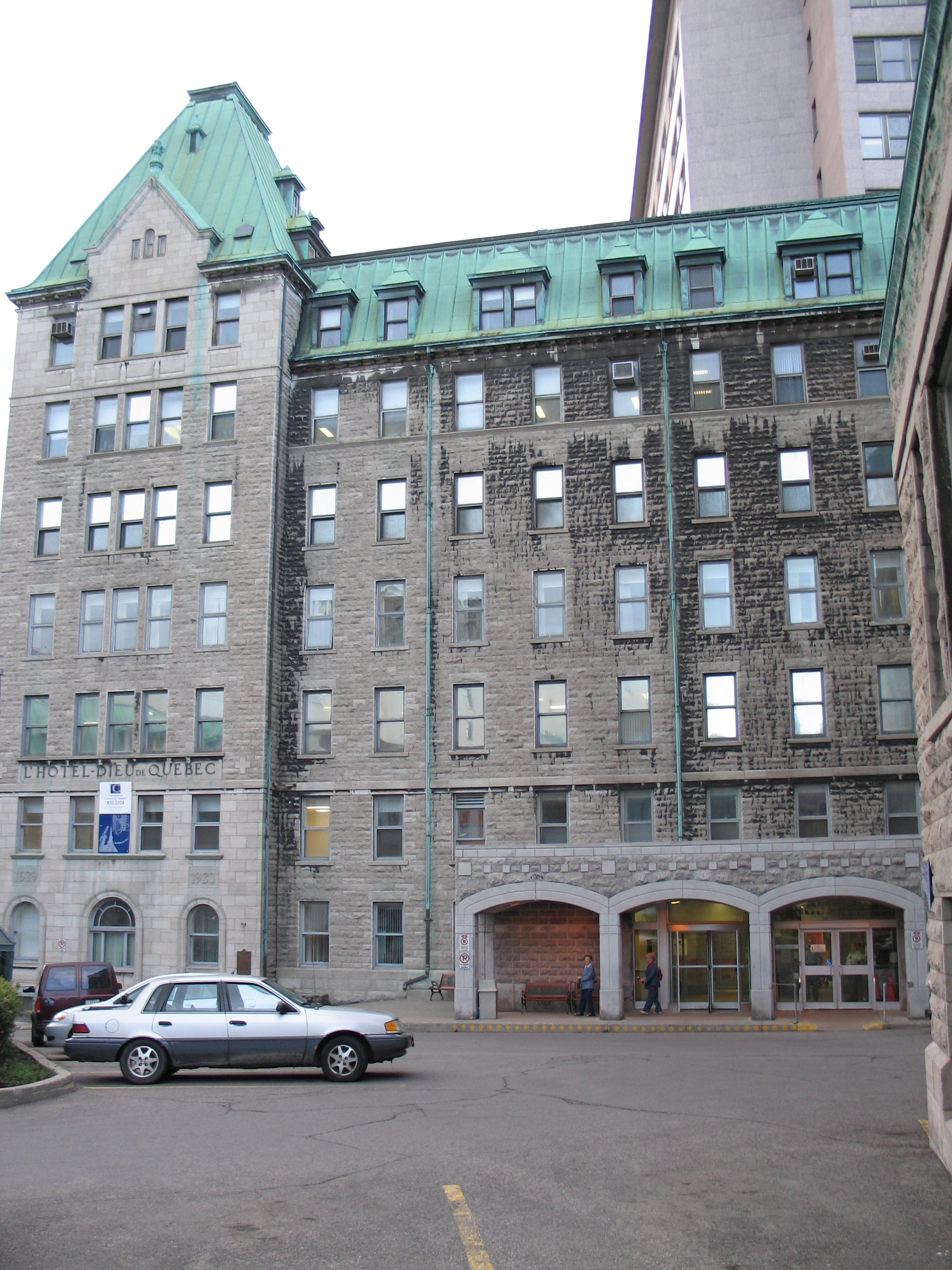
Hôtel-Dieu de Québec in 2007

Health and social services in this region are covered by the Centre intégré universitaire de santé et de services sociaux de la Capitale-Nationale (CIUSSS de la Capitale-Nationale). There are currently thirteen hospitals in the Capitale-Nationale region:

- CHU de Québec-Université Laval
  - Hôpital Saint-François d'Assise
  - Hôpital de l'Enfant-Jésus
  - Hôpital du Saint-Sacrement
  - Hôtel-Dieu de Québec
  - CHUL et Centre mère-enfant Soleil
- Hôpital Sainte-Anne-de-Beaupré (Sainte-Anne-de-Beaupré)
- Jeffrey Hale - St Brigid's Hospital
- Hôpital de Baie-Saint-Paul (Baie-Saint-Paul)
- Hôpital Chauveau (Québec, Quebec)
- Hôpital de La Malbaie (La Malbaie)
- Hôpital régional de Portneuf (Portneuf, Quebec)
- Institut universitaire en santé mentale de Québec
- Institut universitaire de cardiologie et de pneumologie de Québec

== Mauricie ==
Health and social services in this region are covered by the Centre intégré universitaire de santé et de services sociaux de la Mauricie-et-du-Centre-du-Québec (CIUSSS-MCQ). There are currently six hospitals in the Mauricie region:

- Hôpital du Centre-de-la-Mauricie (Shawinigan)
- Hôpital et Centre d'hébergement en santé mentale de la Mauricie-et-du-Centre-du-Québec (Shawinigan)
- Centre hospitalier affilié universitaire régional (CHAUR) (Trois-Rivières)
- Hôpital Sainte-Croix (Drummondville)
- Hôtel-Dieu d’Arthabaska (Victoriaville)
- Centre de services du Haut-Saint-Maurice (La Tuque, Quebec)

== Estrie ==
Health and social services in this region are covered by the Centre intégré universitaire de santé et de services sociaux de l'Estrie - Centre hospitalier universitaire de Sherbrooke (CIUSSS de l'Estrie - CHUS). There are currently ten hospitals in the Estrie region:

- Centre hospitalier universitaire de Sherbrooke (CHUS)
  - Hôpital Fleurimont
  - Hôtel-Dieu de Sherbrooke
- Centre de services ambulatoires Saint-Jacques (Granby, Quebec)
- Hôpital et centre d'hébergement D'Youville (Sherbrooke)
- Hôpital et centre d'hébergement Argyll (Sherbrooke)
- Hôpital, CLSC et centre d'hébergement d'Asbestos (Asbestos, Quebec)
- Hôpital Brome-Missisquoi-Perkins (Cowansville)
- Centre de santé et de services sociaux de la MRC-de-Coaticook (Coaticook)
- Centre de santé et services sociaux de Memphrémagog (Magog, Quebec)
- Centre de santé et de services sociaux du Granit (Lac-Mégantic, Quebec)

== Montreal ==
Health and social services in this region are covered by five chapters, namely the Centre intégré universitaire de santé et de services sociaux de l'Est-de-l'Île-de-Montréal (CIUSSS de l'Est-de-l'Île-de-Montréal), the Centre intégré universitaire de santé et de services sociaux de l'Ouest-de-l'Île-de-Montréal (CIUSSS de l'Ouest-de-l'Île-de-Montréal), the Centre intégré universitaire de santé et de services sociaux du Centre-Ouest-de-l'Île-de-Montréal (CIUSSS du Centre-Ouest-de-l'Île-de-Montréal), the Centre intégré universitaire de santé et de services sociaux du Centre-Sud-de-l'Île-de-Montréal (CIUSSS du Centre-Sud-de-l'Île-de-Montréal), and the Centre intégré universitaire de santé et de services sociaux du Nord-de-l'Île-de-Montréal (CIUSSS du Nord-de-l'Île-de-Montréal). Some hospitals are also academic centres affiliated with McGill University or the Université de Montréal. There are currently over thirty hospitals in the Montreal region:

- CIUSSS de l'Est-de-l'Île-de-Montréal
  - Hôpital Maisonneuve-Rosemont
  - Hôpital Santa Cabrini Ospedale
  - Institut universitaire en santé mentale de Montréal (previously known as Hôpital Louis-H. Lafontaine)

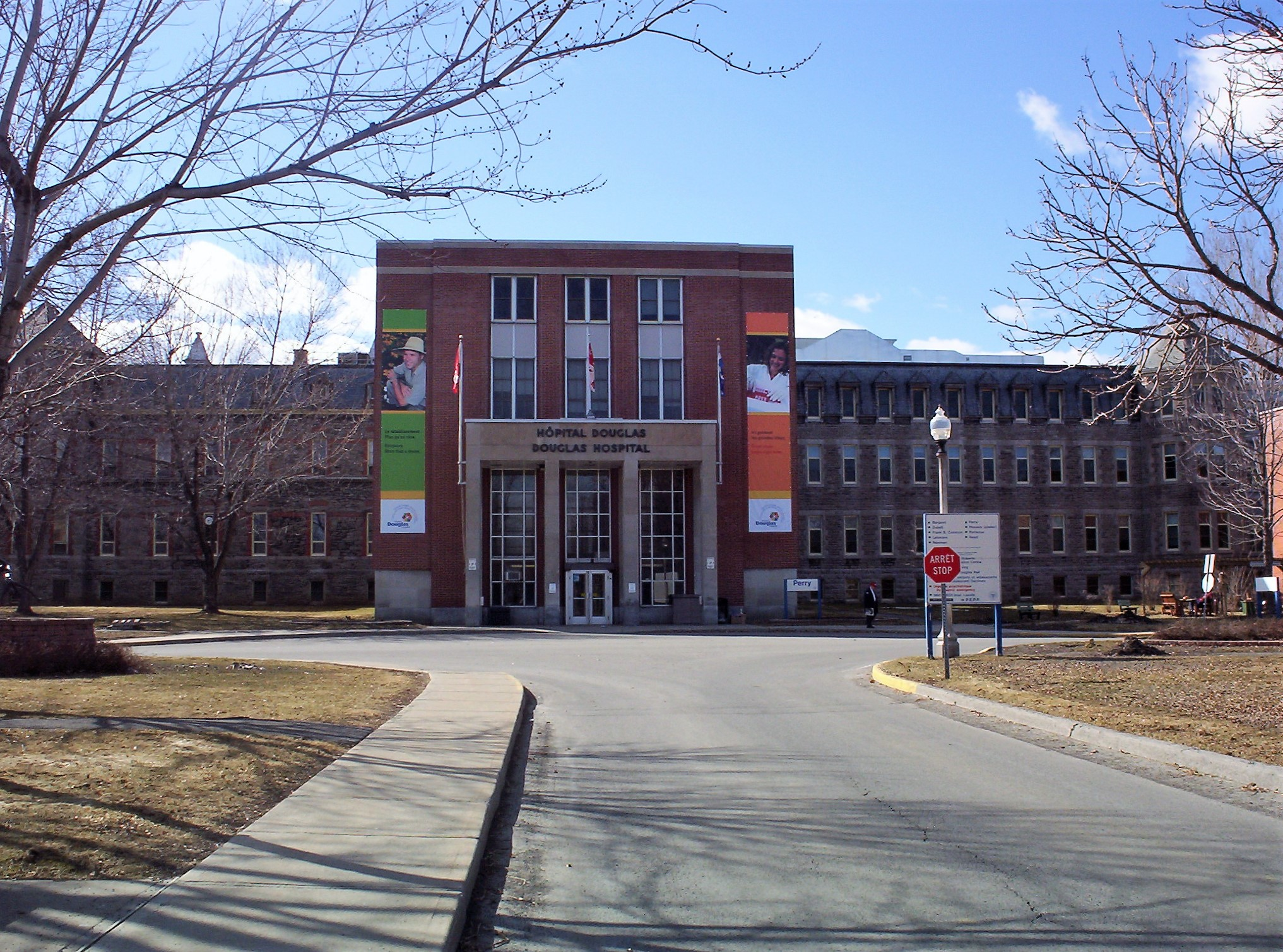
Douglas Mental Health University Institute in 2019

- CIUSSS de l'Ouest-de-l'Île-de-Montréal
  - St. Mary's Hospital
  - Hôpital de LaSalle
  - Lakeshore General Hospital
  - Douglas Mental Health University Institute
- CIUSSS du Centre-Ouest-de-l'Île-de-Montréal
  - Jewish General Hospital
  - Mount Sinai Hospital Montreal
  - Hôpital Richardson
  - Hôpital Catherine Booth
  - Donald Berman Maimonides Geriatric Centre
- CIUSSS du Centre-Sud-de-l'Île-de-Montréal
  - Hôpital Notre-Dame
  - Hôpital de Verdun
  - Montreal Chinese Hospital
  - Institut universitaire de gériatrie de Montréal
  - Institut de réadaptation Gingras-Lindsay de Montréal
- CIUSSS du Nord-de-l'Île-de-Montréal
  - Hôpital du Sacré-Cœur de Montréal
  - Hôpital Jean-Talon
  - Hôpital Fleury
  - Hôpital en santé mentale Rivière-des-Prairies
  - Hôpital en santé mentale Albert-Prévost
- McGill University Health Centre (MUHC)
  - Royal Victoria Hospital
    - Allan Memorial Institute
    - Montreal Chest Institute
  - Montreal General Hospital
  - Montreal Children's Hospital
  - Montreal Neurological Institute and Hospital
  - Hôpital de Lachine
- Shriners Hospital for Children
- Centre hospitalier de l'Université de Montréal (CHUM)

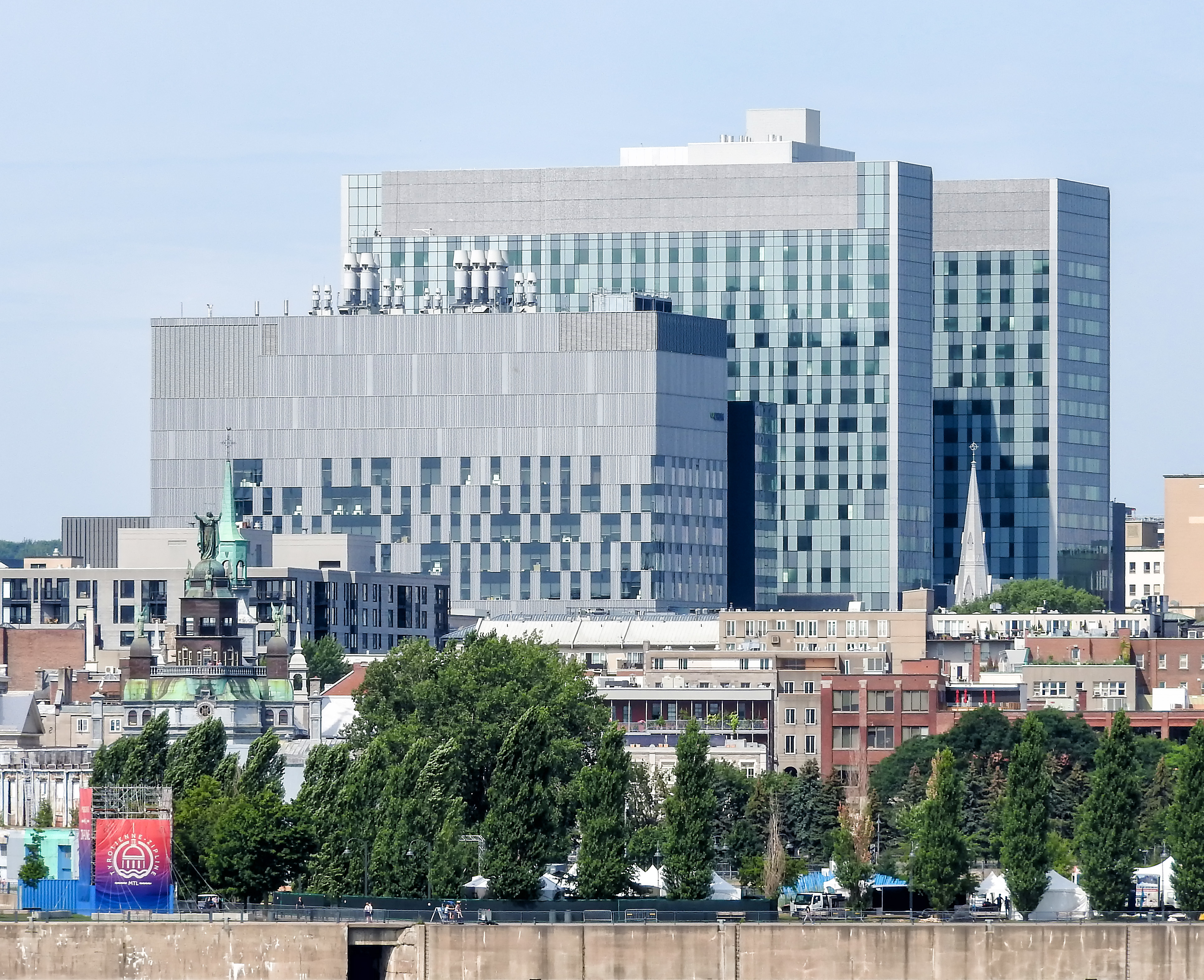
Centre hospitalier de l'Université de Montréal in 2017 on the previous site of the Hôpital Saint-Luc

- CHU Sainte-Justine - Centre hospitalier universitaire mère-enfant (affiliated to the Université de Montréal but independent from the Centre hospitalier de l'Université de Montréal)
  - Centre de réadaptation Marie Enfant
- Montreal Heart Institute
- Hôpital de réadaptation Villa Medica
- Institut Philippe-Pinel de Montréal
- Hôpital Sainte-Anne
- Hôpital Marie-Clarac

== Outaouais ==
Health and social services in this region are covered by the Centre intégré universitaire de santé et de services sociaux de l'Outaouais (CISSS de l'Outaouais). There are currently seven hospitals in the Outaouais region:

- Hôpital de Gatineau
- Hôpital de Hull
- Hôpital en santé mentale Pierre-Janet
- Hôpital et CHSLD de Papineau (Buckingham, Quebec)
- Wakefield Memorial Hospital (Wakefield, Quebec)
- Hôpital de Maniwaki (Maniwaki)
- Hôpital et CHSLD du Pontiac (Shawville, Quebec)

== Abitibi-Témiscamingue ==
Health and social services in this region are covered by the Centre intégré universitaire de santé et de services sociaux de l'Abitibi-Témiscamingue (CISSS de l'Abitibi-Témiscamingue). There are currently seven hospitals in the Abitibi-Témiscamingue region:

- Hôpital d'Amos
- Hôpital de La Sarre
- Hôpital de Rouyn-Noranda
- Hôpital de Ville-Marie
- Hôpital de Témiscaming-Kipawa
- Hôpital de Val-d'Or
- Hôpital en santé mentale de Malartic

== Côte-Nord ==
Health and social services in this region are covered by the Centre intégré de santé et de services sociaux de la Côte-Nord (CISSS de la Côte-Nord). There are currently nine hospitals in the Côte-Nord region:

- Centre multiservices de santé et de services sociaux des Escoumins
- Centre multiservices de santé et de services sociaux de Forestville
- Hôpital Le Royer
- Centre multiservices de santé et de services sociaux de Port-Cartier
- Hôpital de Sept-Îles
- Centre multiservices de santé et de services sociaux de Sept-Îles
- Centre multiservices de santé et de services sociaux de la Minganie
- Centre multiservices de santé et de services sociaux de la Basse-Côte-Nord
- Centre multiservices de santé et de services sociaux de Fermont

== Gaspésie–Îles-de-la-Madeleine ==
Health and social services in this region are covered by the Centre intégré de santé et de services sociaux de la Gaspésie (CISSS de la Gaspésie) and the Centre intégré de santé et de services sociaux des Îles (CISSS des Îles).

- CISSS de la Gaspésie
  - Hôpital de Gaspé
  - Hôpital de Chandler
  - Hôpital de Maria
  - Hôpital de Sainte-Anne-des-Monts
- CISSS des Îles
  - Hôpital de l'Archipel

== Chaudière-Appalaches ==
Health and social services in this region are covered by the Centre intégré de santé et de services sociaux de Chaudière-Appalaches (CISSS de Chaudière-Appalaches). There are currently eight hospitals in the Chaudière-Appalaches region:

- Hôtel-Dieu de Lévis
- Hôpital de Thetford Mines
- Hôpital de Saint-Georges
- Hôpital de Montmagny
- Hôpital de jour Le Cap
- Consultations externes de Lévis - Jean XXIII
- Centre Paul-Gilbert - CHSLD de Charny
- Centre de services ambulatoires en pédopsychiatrie de Lévis

== Laval ==
Health and social services in this region are covered by the Centre intégré de santé et de services sociaux de Laval (CISSS de Laval). There are currently two hospitals in Laval:

- Hôpital de la Cité-de-la-Santé
- Jewish Rehabilitation Hospital

== Lanaudière ==
Health and social services in this region are covered by the Centre intégré de santé et de services sociaux de Lanaudière (CISSS de Lanaudière). There are currently two hospitals in the Lanaudière region:

- Hôpital Pierre-Le Gardeur (Terrebonne, Quebec)
- Centre hospitalier De Lanaudière (Saint-Charles-Borromée, Quebec)

== Laurentides ==
Health and social services in this region are covered by the Centre intégré de santé et de services sociaux des Laurentides (CISSS des Laurentides). There are currently six hospitals in the Laurentides region:

- Centre multiservices de santé et de services sociaux d'Argenteuil
- Hôpital de Mont-Laurier
- Hôpital de Saint-Eustache
- Hôpital Laurentien
- Hôpital régional de Saint-Jérôme
- Centre de services de Rivière-Rouge

== Montérégie ==
Health and social services in this region are covered by the Centre intégré de santé et de services sociaux de la Montérégie-Centre (CISSS de la Montérégie-Centre), Centre intégré de santé et de services sociaux de la Montérégie-Est (CISSS de la Montérégie-Est), and Centre intégré de santé et de services sociaux de la Montérégie-Ouest (CISSS de la Montérégie-Ouest). There are currently nine hospitals in the Montérégie region:

- CISSS de la Montérégie-Centre
  - Hôpital du Haut-Richelieu
  - Hôpital Charles-LeMoyne
- CISSS de la Montérégie-Est
  - Hôpital Pierre-Boucher
  - Hôpital Honoré-Mercier
  - Hôtel-Dieu de Sorel
- CISSS de la Montérégie-Ouest
  - Hôpital du Suroît
  - Barrie Memorial Hospital
  - Hôpital Anna-Laberge
  - Centre Hospitalier Kateri-Memorial Tehsakotitsen : Tha

== See also ==
- List of hospitals in Canada
- CLSC
- Administrative regions of Quebec
- Healthcare in Canada
