= List of hospitals in Quebec City =

The following is a list of the hospitals in Quebec City, Quebec, Canada.

== Centre hospitalier universitaire de Québec ==
Centre hospitalier universitaire de Québec (CHUQ):

- Hôtel-Dieu de Québec
- Hôpital Saint-François d'Assise
- Saint Brigid's – Jeffery Hale Hospital
- Centre hospitalier de l'Université Laval (CHUL)

=== Affiliate institutions ===
- Foyer des vétérans - Located at the CHUL, shelter and permanent long-term care for veterans
- Centre mère-enfant - Located at the CHUL, care of newborns and their mothers, children and future mothers of the city
- Maison Paul-Triquet - Shelter for long-term care for veterans
- Centre de traitement en santé mentale dans la communauté - Located in Sillery, care of patients with psychiatric problems
- Centre de pédopsychiatrie - Located in the former building of the Hôtel-Dieu du Sacré-Cœur de Jésus, care of children (0-17) with psychiatric problems

== Institutions affiliated with University Laval ==
- Centre hospitalier affilié universitaire de Québec (CHA)
  - Hôpital de l'Enfant-Jésus
  - Hôpital du Saint-Sacrement
- Institut universitaire en santé mentale de Québec (Mental Health University Institute of Quebec) - Located in Beauport (formerly called Hôpital Robert-Giffard)
- Institut universitaire de cardiologie et de pneumologie de Québec (IUCPQ) - (formerly called Hôpital anti-syndical)

== See also ==
- List of hospitals in Canada
