= 2023 Amqui truck attack =

2023 fatal collision in Quebec, Canada

- 2023 Amqui truck attack (Eastern Quebec) 2023 Amqui truck attack (Canada)
- Location: Amqui, Quebec, Canada
- Date: March 13, 2023 ≈ 3:00 p.m. (EST, UTC−05:00)
- Target: Pedestrians
- Attack type: Vehicle-ramming attack
- Weapon: Pickup truck
- Deaths: 3
- Injuries: 8
- Motive: Under investigation
- Accused: Steeve Gagnon
- Charges: 3 first-degree murder; 9 attempted murder

On March 13, 2023, a pickup truck hit eleven pedestrians in Amqui, Quebec, Canada, killing three men and injuring eight others, including two children.

The incident had a large impact on the small, tightly knit town, with the Premier of Quebec leading a delegation to show his support for the grieving community.

The accused turned himself in to police shortly after allegedly fleeing the scene. Police investigators described the incident as premeditated and deliberate. On April 4, the accused was charged with three counts of first-degree murder, 9 counts of attempted murder, and 2 counts of dangerous driving. The trial began in May 2025. On June 21 2025, Gagnon was found guilty on three counts of first-degree murder and two counts of attempted murder using a motor vehicle.

== Incident ==
At 3:00 p.m. EST on March 13, 2023, in Amqui, a town 350 kilometers (220 miles) northeast of Quebec City in the Gaspésie region of Quebec, Canada, a man drove his pick up truck into groups of pedestrians walking along Saint-Benoît Boulevard, also known as Route 132. The driver fled the scene. A suspect turned himself to police shortly after the incident and was arrested. Investigators allege that the driver swerved between sides of the road in order to hit victims who were chosen at random and that it was a deliberate attack.

A witness said victims were spread over hundreds of metres. Police allege that the driver swerved from one side of the road to the other to strike pedestrians at random.

Eleven people were struck in the incident, including a nine-month-old baby in a stroller and a three-year-old. The children's injuries were serious but not life-threatening. Two elderly men, aged 65 and 73, were killed. Three victims were hospitalized with life-threatening injuries; one, aged 41, later died. Three victims remain in the hospital in critical condition.

Journal de Montréal sources report that SQ investigators have acquired surveillance video showing the accused's pick up truck moving slowly on the grounds of his old high school minutes before moving on to the attack scene; they are investigating whether he intended to attack students at the school.

== Victims ==
In the hours after the incident, the Sûreté du Québec (SQ) confirmed two dead at the scene and nine injured, with three people facing life-threatening injuries. On March 19, a third victim, aged 41, died from his crash-related injuries at the Centre hospitalier de l'Université Laval (CHUL) in Quebec City. Originally from the Gaspé, Simon-Guillaume Bourget had been living in Amqui for a year, working at a local garden centre. The news hit those working at this business particularly hard as they'd already lost a coworker to this attack. His family announced that he donated his organs for transplant.

The injured were rushed to the Amqui Hospital and a code orange was declared, indicating a high casualty incident. Five patients with critical injuries were transferred to hospitals in Quebec City, four to the children's hospital at l'Hôpital de l'Enfant-Jesus and one adult to the Centre hospitalier universitaire de Québec; the two young children were released from hospital the following day Three patients remained in hospital in stable condition by March 19, including the mother of the two children released from care the day after the incident.

== Aftermath ==
The SQ also announced that the incident was deliberate and that the driver acted alone. Senior government officials unofficially confirmed with the media that it was not a terrorist attack.

On March 15, the town reopened the road of the crash site and declared that the town hall would observe a period of mourning until March 20, flying flags at half mast and ringing the church bells at 3:05 pm, the time of the incident. Four patients remained in hospital, three in critical condition. Police appealed to the public for video of the crash to help with the investigation. On March 16, a candlelight vigil was held outside the town's church to commemorate the victims. The evening of March 17, a mass at the Saint-Benoit-Joseph-Labre church in Amqui honored the victims.

Daily life in the close-knit community, local government, and local school had returned to normal within three months, but by the end of the year citizens still struggled to deal with the tragedy, particularly the fact that the attack had come from someone within the community.

== Accused ==
The driver was Steeve Gagnon, 38, of Amqui. He grew up in Saint-Léon-le-Grand in the Bas-Saint-Laurent region of Quebec. In 2006, he pleaded guilty to drunk driving charges for a fine of $600. In August 2022, he quit his job of one year driving trucks for a transport company in Mont-Joli to take medical leave. Neighbors and employer describe an isolated man with few friends. The accused was known to police, having sent them a letter within a few weeks of the attack. Friends who spoke with him in the weeks before the incident said he was experiencing "hard times" and suffered from poor mental health. In the weeks leading up to the incident, the accused posted increasingly incoherent videos involving conspiracy theories on TikTok, including one several hours before the attack.

== Legal proceedings ==
The accused turned himself in to the Sûreté du Québec (SQ) shortly after fleeing the scene. Police arrested him for a hit and run causing death.

Gagnon appeared at the Amqui courthouse to be charged on March 14, heckled by onlookers as he was led in by police. The Crown attorney charged him with two counts of dangerous driving causing death, and announced that further charges will likely be laid once all witnesses were interviewed. The Crown argued that there was evidence that the accused had planned the attack and should remain in custody during the trial. The defending attorney said that his client understood the charges against him, waived the right to a bail hearing, and entered no plea. Gagnon was remanded into custody.

In his second hearing at the Amqui courthouse on April 4, Gagnon was charged with 3 counts of first-degree murder and 9 counts of attempted murder. The Crown declared that investigation into the incident were continuing. The defense claimed they were waiting for investigation to finish before requesting a possible psychiatric assessment, but would opt for a jury trial. The defendant remained silent during the proceedings. The judge set the next pre-trial hearing for June 20, 2023.

On June 20, 2023, the accused appeared briefly before the court in Amqui where the judge set September 5–8 as dates for a preliminary inquiry.

On August 30, 2023, the defense attorney's request to have the preliminary hearing delayed from September 5, 2023, until Jan. 15, 2024 was granted.

On January 15, 2024, the preliminary hearing to determine if there was enough evidence to proceed to trial began, but under a publication ban. The preliminary inquiry was scheduled to last five days but the hearing ended January 17 with the consent of both parties. The judge initially scheduled the trial for June 2024, but it did not begin until May 15, 2025, in Rimouski.

During the trial, Gagnon admitted to driving the vehicle, but the defence argued he dropped something on to the floor of his truck before reaching down to retrieve it when he struck the pedestrians, therefore not meeting the criteria for a premeditated, first-degree murder.

On June 21, 2025, Gagnon was found guilty on three counts of first-degree murder and two counts of attempted murder using a motor vehicle. He was immediately sentenced life in prison without the possibility of parole for 25 years on the murder charges and 10 years for each of the attempted murder charges, to be served concurrently.

== Response ==
Quebec Premier François Legault offered his support to residents of Amqui after conversing with the town's mayor. Prime Minister Justin Trudeau also expressed his concern to the town, stating "My heart is with the people of Amqui, Quebec today. As we learn more about the tragic events that have taken place, I'm keeping everyone affected in my thoughts."

On March 17, Premier François Legault led a delegation of provincial party leaders to Amqui to walk along the street where people were struck by the truck and support the people of the town. He promised that his government would do more to fund mental health programs to prevent incidents like this in the spring 2023 budget.

This incident is part of a number of violent crimes involving mental health issues covered by the media in 2023 leading to political leaders commenting on the need for better mental health treatment in Quebec. Legal and mental health professionals have expressed concern that this could lead to the unwarranted stigmatization of those with mental illnesses.

== See also ==
- Laval daycare bus crash
