= Bones of Belonging =

2023 non-fiction book by Annahid Dashtgard

Bones of Belonging: Finding Wholeness in a White World
- Author: Annahid Dashtgard
- Subject: Racism
- Genre: Non-fiction
- Publisher: Dundurn Press
- Publication date: 2023
- Pages: 216
- ISBN: 9781459750623

Bones of Belonging: Finding Wholeness in a White World is a 2023 non-fiction book by Annahid Dashtgard.

The book presents a collection of essays on the theme of racism. It was met with positive critical reviews.

== Publication ==
The 216-page book was written by Annahid Dashtgard and published by Dundurn Press in 2023.

== Synopsis ==
In Bones of Belonging, Dashtgard writes about her experiences as "a Brown woman working for change in a white world." The book is a collection of essays about author's experiences of racism in England and Canada and incorporates humour as well as poignancy.

== Critical reception ==
The book was recommended by CBC Books and Ms. magazine. Hamilton Review of Books described the book as deft and praised the author for writing "with wisdom, honesty, and a wry humour".

== See also ==
- Breaking the Ocean (by the same author)
