= Beynon =

Beynon may refer to:

places:

- Beynon, Alberta, Canada

people with the surname Beynon:

- Ben Beynon (1894–1969), Welsh international rugby player and professional football player
- Bill Beynon (1891–1932), British and Empire bantamweight champion boxer
- David Beynon, rugby league footballer of the 1900s for Wales, and Oldham
- Granville Beynon (1914–1996), Welsh physicist
- Kate Beynon, Australian artist
- John Beynon, pseudonym of John Wyndham (1903–1969), science fiction writer
- Sir John Beynon, 1st Baronet (1864–1944), Welsh steel and coal owner
- John Beynon (b. 1939), Welsh academic and former principal of King's College London
- Thomas Beynon (disambiguation)
- William Beynon (1888–1958), Tsimshian historian and translator
- William Addison Beynon (1877–1968), Canadian politician
