= Breaking the Ocean =

2019 memoir by Annahid Dashtgard

- Author: Annahid Dashtgard
- Genre: Non-fiction, memoir
- Publisher: House of Anansi Press
- Publication date: 2019
- ISBN: 978-1-48700-647-1

Breaking the Ocean: A Memoir of Race, Rebellion, and Reconciliation is a 2019 book by Annahid Dashtgard.

The book recounts the author's time in Iran, England and Canada. As a child she was on the receiving end of racism in both her new countries before becoming an activist.

== Publication ==
Breaking the Ocean is a 280-page memoir, published by House of Anansi Press in 2019. It was written by Annahid Dashtgard.

== Synopsis ==
Breaking the Ocean recounts Dashtgard's early years in Tehran, before the Islamic Revolution forced her family to move to Skellingthorpe, England when she was aged seven and later move to Canada. The book describes the author's experiences of racism in Canada and England and her motivations to take up anti-corporate globalisation activism.

== Critical reception ==
Shazia Hafiz Ramji reviewing the book for Quill & Quire praised the author's candour and "straightforward honesty". Ramji described the book as unique and "deeply felt and striking in its clarity and relevance."

Karla J. Strand, writing for Ms. Magazine described the book as "brave and vulnerable, soft and sharp".

== See also ==
- Bones of Belonging (by the same author)
