= Laval daycare bus crash =

2023 fatal crash in Quebec, Canada

- Laval daycare bus crash (Montreal) Laval daycare bus crash (Canada)
- Location: Sainte-Rose, Laval, Quebec, Canada
- Date: February 8, 2023; 8:30 am EST (Eastern Time Zone)
- Target: Children attending the daycare and teachers working there
- Attack type: Vehicle-ramming attack
- Weapon: Bus
- Deaths: 2
- Injuries: 6
- Motive: Under investigation
- Accused: Pierre Ny St-Amand

On February 8, 2023, bus driver Pierre Ny St-Amand deliberately crashed Société de transport de Laval (STL) bus into a daycare in Laval, Quebec, Canada, killing two children and injuring six others. St-Amand was quickly subdued by bystanders and arrested. Trauma support was provided to affected families and residents. Quebec Premier François Legault and Canadian Prime Minister Justin Trudeau visited the area to pay respects in the days following the incident.

St-Amand, a father of two with no prior criminal record, was arrested on eight charges. A Quebec Superior Court ordered a psychiatric evaluation to assess his mental state during the crash. In March 2024, the court ruled there was sufficient evidence for trial, and St-Amand remained detained at the Philippe-Pinel Institute pending trial. The trial began April 7, 2025, and concluded 22 days later with the judge determining that St-Amand was not criminally responsible due to temporary psychosis at the time of the incident.

== Incident ==
On the morning of Wednesday, February 8, 2023, parents were dropping off their children at the Garderie Éducative de Sainte-Rose daycare on Terrasse Dufferin, a cul-de-sac in the Sainte-Rose district of Laval. Buses for the Société de Transport de Laval operate regularly on this road, turning around in the roundabout at the end of the road and stopping near the daycare.

At around 8:30 am EST, witnesses reported hearing a bus operated by driver Pierre Ny St-Amand rev its engine. The vehicle turned sharply into the daycare's driveway and accelerated toward the section of the building where preschoolers were gathered. It plowed through the exterior wall, causing significant structural damage and destabilizing parts of the roof.

St-Amand exited the bus and began to remove his clothing while shouting. Witnesses and parents quickly subdued St-Amand, while others rushed to rescue children from the debris and falling ceiling fragments. Emergency responders arrived within moments. St-Amand was restrained and loaded into a police vehicle. Witnesses described him as not in his right mind. The damaged bus was towed from the scene late in the evening.

== Victims ==
At noon, police announced that one child had been pronounced dead at the scene, while another had died in hospital. Funerals and memorials for the two children were held at the Sainte-Rose-de-Lima Church February 15 and 25, respectively.

Two boys and two girls were taken to Sainte-Justine children's hospital in Montreal; three others were taken to Cité-de-la-Santé hospital in Laval. Two of four children aged three to five years old taken in by Sainte-Justine Hospital were released the following day.

== Aftermath ==
Uninjured children were taken to a nearby elementary school where police and daycare workers calmed the children. Panicked parents that showed up at the blocked-off crash site were directed towards the school and had to wait two hours as identities were confirmed. Parents of injured children were taken out of the room and informed of their children's status, and the remaining parents told their children were safe.

By the evening, bereaved local residents had set up a spontaneous memorial with flowers and stuffed toys. Police and social services set up a command post to offer mental health support to visitors. Residents gathered in the evening to console each other at the Sainte-Rose-de-Lima parish church.

The following morning, Quebec Premier François Legault and leaders of provincial opposition parties laid flowers and expressed condolences at the scene. A moment of silence was observed at the provincial legislature in Quebec City and at the Canadian House of Commons in Ottawa. Daycares all over Quebec flew white flags in solidarity with the crash victims. In the evening, Canadian Prime Minister Justin Trudeau and Laval mayor Stéphane Boyer paid their respects at the vigil with dozens of people gathered in front of the church. On February 15, bus drivers in Laval and Montreal paused operations for a moment of silence to reflect and to pay their respects one week after the crash.

Funerals and memorials for the two children killed in the crash were held later in the month at the Sainte-Rose-de-Lima parish church.

== Response ==
The day after the crash, Quebec minister of social services Lionel Carmant announced that the driver was not on waiting lists for mental health services. Several legal experts questioned the legality of the Minister accessing and publicizing private health records. The incident was one of several violent tragedies in Quebec involving mental health issues that prompted Canadian legal and mental health experts to warn of the media stigmatizing those with mental health problems.

The City of Laval suspended bus service on the dead-end street in front of the daycare and scheduled a return for June 10, 2023. The city delayed the opening of the bus route until September at the request of parents worried that the return of busses could aggravate traumatized children.

The crash prompted calls from parents groups for stronger safety measures to control speed around schools and daycares with more bollards and speed bumps.

In December 2023, friends of some of the victims' families, frustrated with the lack of access to mental health treatment, launched a petition to have the provincial government revise its 2021 reform of the province's program for Compensation for Victims of Criminal Acts.

On the anniversary of the incident, families of the victims gathered in a park near the daycare and released balloons to remember their loved ones.

== Accused ==
The bus driver was identified as 51-year-old Pierre Ny St-Amand. Born in Cambodia, he arrived in Canada in 1983 in the aftermath of the Cambodian genocide and was adopted as an orphan by a Québécois family originally from New Brunswick. He grew up in Sept-Îles, in the Côte-Nord region. He changed his given name from Ny to Pierre Ny in 1991.

In the late 1990s, he attended and graduated from Collège Montmorency in Laval. College officials say he had a difficult childhood and was often rejected by others, but received considerable support from the college, remained active in alumni activities, and was a quiet and kind person. He had worked for the STL for 10 years and had no previous criminal convictions.

St-Amand lived in Laval in a detached house with his partner since 2014. Neighbours described a doting father of two and expressed disbelief that a father could have committed such a crime. He and his partner have been living together in a traditional Cambodian marriage for 10 years. This marriage has no legal status in Quebec, and they had been scheduled to be legally married in front of a notary on March 11, 2023. Family friends say their marriage had no financial or obvious marital problems, and that their children do well in school.

The Quebec association representing private daycares confirmed that he had no link to the daycare. According to health authorities, St-Amand was not on a waiting list for mental health services. He has no criminal record.

== Legal proceedings ==
St-Amand was arrested on the scene and was charged with two counts of first-degree murder, attempted murder, two counts of aggravated assault, and four counts of assault with a weapon causing bodily harm.

Police handcuffed and arrested the accused on arrival, dragging him naked to the police car. Witnesses said St-Amand was screaming unintelligibly with his eyes bulging, that he "wasn’t in his right mind", and "was in a different world". He was taken to Sacré-Cœur Hospital in Montreal to treat his injuries.

In the evening, St-Amand appeared before a judge from his hospital bed via videoconference under police supervision, refusing to speak. He was ordered to undergo psychiatric evaluation. St-Amand allegedly hit a police officer during the hearing.

On 17 February, Quebec Superior Court Justice Carol Richer ordered another psychiatric evaluation by the Philippe-Pinel institute to see if the accused could understand the proceedings and was fit to stand trial. St-Amand appeared dishevelled at the Laval courthouse, accompanied by four special constables who held down his arms during proceedings. His defence lawyer, Julien Lespérance Hudon, claimed that he was only occasionally able to speak with his client as he would lapse into an incommunicative state.

On 24 February, the accused was found fit to stand trial. St-Amand was much more alert and responsive than at the previous hearing. However, while both the prosecution and defence agreed that the psychiatric report indicated that St-Amand was able to understand the proceedings, they also noted evidence in the report justifying another psychiatric evaluation to determine if he had suffered a mental disorder at the time of the crash. Judge Marc-André Dagenais ordered a second psychiatric evaluation to determine if the accused had been criminally responsible at the time of the crash and ordered the psychiatric report sealed.

On March 28, psychiatrists asked the court for more time to complete the evaluation as additional tests were requested, adding that the accused was cooperating fully with the evaluation. Psychiatrists submitted their 22-page report to the court on April 26, and the court gave the prosecution and defence until a new hearing date on June 13 to examine the assessment. The accused appeared by video conference from the Philippe-Pinel Psychiatric Institute where he remained in custody for treatment and assessment while awaiting trial.

On June 13, the accused's assessment hearing was delayed to August 22 to allow the prosecution more time to disclose evidence. It was again postponed on that date to September 26.

On September 26, 2023, the defence counsel appeared at a preliminary hearing to announce that it had received all the evidence from the prosecution and was continuing to prepare a defence. Counsel commented that it hoped to make its case for avoiding a trial at a weeklong preliminary hearing in March or April 2024.

On November 29, 2023, the court set March 25, 2024 as the date for the preliminary hearing to determine whether there was enough evidence to proceed to trial. The defence announced that it would challenge the first two charges of first-degree murder. The prosecutor said that they would call several civilian witnesses, psychiatrists and psychologists to testify on issues of criminal responsibility, plus family members of the accused. All parties agreed to schedule the hearing for St-Jérôme, Quebec instead of Laval to help speed up the legal process.

On March 25, 2024, the preliminary hearing began in St.-Jérôme under a publication ban on the names of the young victims and any evidence to be presented during the week of the hearing. The defence attorney asked for the ban so as not to prejudice the selection of a jury should the case go to trial. The terms of the publication ban allow reporting on the condition of the accused and procedural matters. The defendant sat handcuffed on the prisoner's dock and calmly took notes on a clipboard. More than 13 witnesses, including police, testified during the four days of testimony. On March 28, 2024, the judge ordered the accused to stand trial before a jury on the original charges of first-degree murder, attempted murder, and aggravated assault. The prosecution was satisfied with the decision, indicating that it showed there was evidence that the alleged murders were premeditated and planned. Families of the victims were emotional during the hearings as for many it was their first time hearing details of the incident.

Two psychiatrists, engaged by the prosecution and the defence respectively, both concluded that St-Amand had likely been in a state of psychosis at the time of the crash and had not been able to tell right from wrong; in response to these reports, the prosecution and the defence informed the court in February 2025 that they would make a joint presentation of the facts of the case and recommend a verdict of not criminally responsible. The trial would be a non-jury trial to determine whether the defendant was criminally responsible. The trial began on April 7, 2025, in Laval. During its first two days, the two psychiatrists presented their expert testimony. The trial concluded with the judge ruling on April 29, 2025, that St-Amand was not criminally responsible for his actions owing to a temporary psychosis that psychiatrists believed he had been suffering on the day of the incident at the daycare. The judge, however, made it clear that the ruling does not acquit or absolve St-Amand. Victim impact statements were set to be heard on May 1.

== See also ==
- 2023 Amqui truck attack
