= Val-d'Espoir =

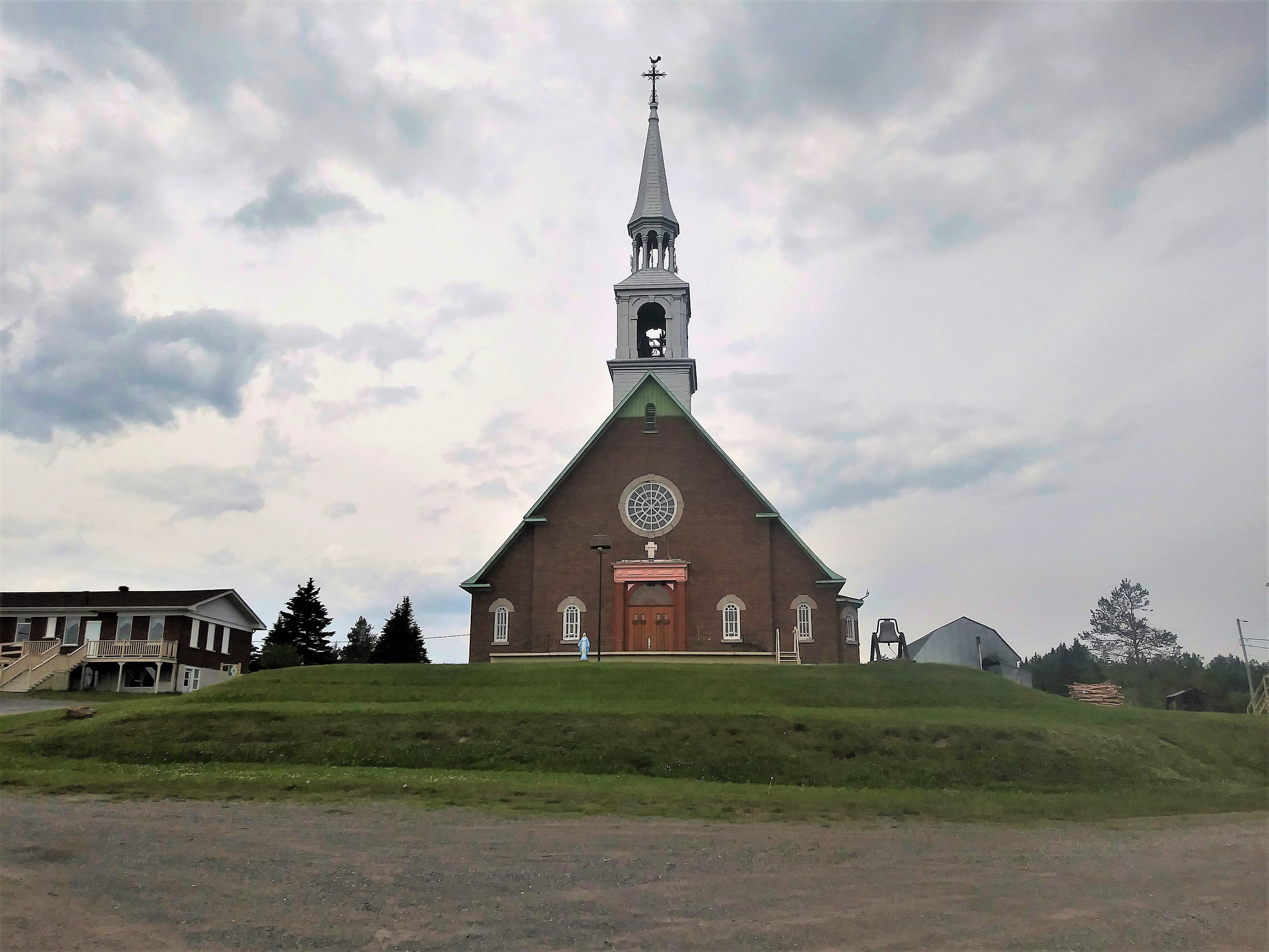
- Church of Saint-François-de-Sales

- Location within Quebec Location within Canada
- Coordinates: 48°30′49″N 64°24′06″W
- Country: Canada
- Province: Quebec
- Administrative region: Gaspésie–Îles-de-la-Madeleine
- City: Percé
- Postal code: G0C 2L0
- Area codes: 418 and 581

Val-d'Espoir is a hamlet within the city of Percé, in the Gaspésie–Îles-de-la-Madeleine region, in eastern Quebec, Canada. It was an unorganized territory until 1971 when the territory was merged with the city of Percé.

== History ==
In the 1930s, an agricultural school was founded in Val-d'Espoir. It closed its doors in 1961.

In 2010, Val-d'Espoir became the site of the famous Groundhog Day where Fred, Quebec's official groundhog, makes his annual predictions of the arrival of spring. This tradition is temporarily interrupted in 2023 when the groundhog Fred had been found dead before making his predictions. In 2024, Groundhog Fred Junior is set to predict whether winter will drag on Friday, February 2 in Val D'Espoir. He's following in the footsteps of his father Fred, and his grandfather, Gros Fred.The hamlet is also the host of the winter carnival of the place, which would be the second oldest winter carnival in Quebec, after that of Quebec City.
