= Thomas Beynon =

Thomas or Tom Beynon may refer to:

- Thomas Beynon (archdeacon of Cardigan) (1744–1833), literary patron and Archdeacon of Cardigan
- Thomas Beynon (Independent minister) (died 1729), Welsh Independent minister from Pembrokeshire
- Tom Beynon (Presbyterian minister) (1886–1961), Presbyterian minister, author, and historian from Carmarthenshire
- Tom Beynon (Canadian football) (1941–2023), Canadian football player

== See also ==
- Thomas Benyon (born 1942), British politician and activist
