= Hôpital de l'Enfant-Jésus =

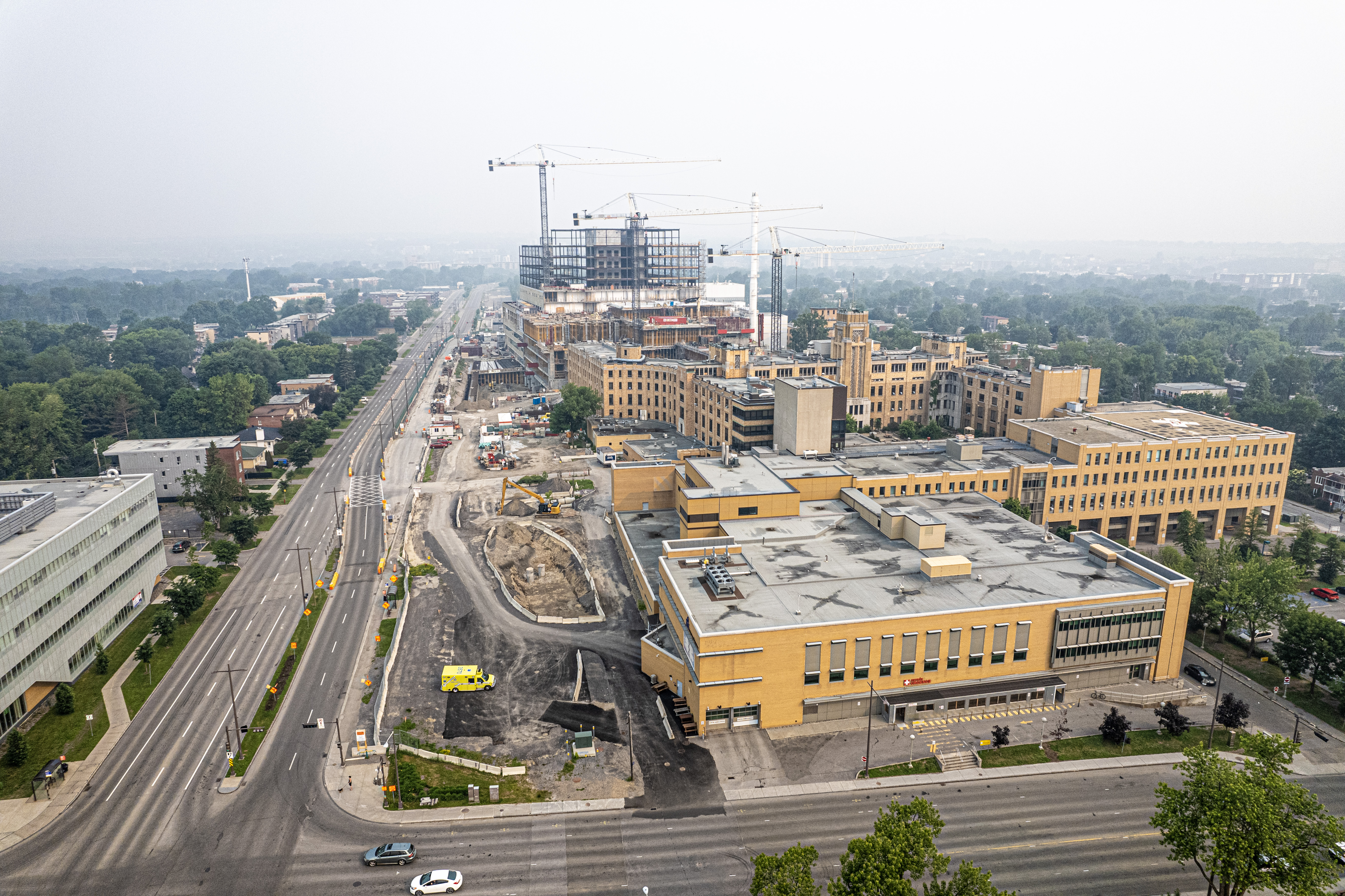

Geography
- Location: Quebec City, Quebec, Canada
- Coordinates: 46°50′15″N 71°13′35″W

Organization
- Care system: RAMQ (Quebec medicare)
- Type: Specialist

Services
- Emergency department: Level 1 Trauma Centre
- Beds: 525
- Speciality: Trauma, burn centre, Neurology

History
- Founded: January 1923

Links
- Website: www.chudequebec.ca
- Lists: Hospitals in Canada

The Hôpital de l'Enfant-Jésus (English: Hospital of the Child Jesus) is a hospital located in Maizerets, a neighborhood of the district of La Cité-Limoilou in Quebec City, Quebec, Canada. It is one of only 3 hospitals in the province with a Level 1 Trauma Centre.

== History ==
The hospital was founded in January 1923 by Dr. Irma Levasseur and his colleagues René Fortier, pediatrician, and Edward Samson, orthopedist. The objective Levasseur is the creation of a first pediatric hospital run by the laity in Quebec . The hospital received its first patient at 55 Grande Allée (Joseph-house Sheyhn). In May 1923, the corporation was created and a medical office was established. The Archdiocese of Quebec allowed the corporation to obtain the services of the Dominican Sisters of the Child Jesus. A nursing school was also established, which is affiliated to Laval University in 1928, then at Cégep Limoilou in 1968.

In October 1923, the hospital moved to the west of the district of Saint-Sauveur, near the Saint-Charles cemetery. On 14 March 1927, it settled definitively in the former juvenate of the Brothers of the Christian Schools, 395, chemin de la Canardière. It initially had 125 beds. Around 1930, the hospital began offering specialized care in areas other than paediatrics. In 1946, the corporation transferred ownership to the Dominican Sisters 2. In 1949, the wing of the Sacred Heart was inaugurated, bringing the number of beds to 525 beds. In the second half of the century, the hospital introduced new medical services, with subspecialties in neurology and traumatology.

In 1995, the hospital administratively merged with the Hospital of the Saint Sacrament to form the University Affiliated Hospital of Québec (CHA). The CHA merged in turn with Quebec University Hospital Centre in July 2012.

== See also ==
- Centre hospitalier universitaire de Québec
- Faculty of Medicine at Laval University - Hospital of the Child Jesus
- Centre hospitalier universitaire de Québec - Hospital of the Child Jesus
