= Annahid Dashtgard =

Iranian-British-Canadian author

- Born: Tehran
- Occupations: Consultant, author
- Organization: Anima Leadership
- Notable work: Breaking the Ocean (2019 book), Bones of Belonging (2023 book), and Fire and Silence: A Roadmap for BIPOC Leaders (2026 book)

Annahid Dashtgard is an Iranian-born Canadian author, activist and consultant. Her family fled Iran for England in 1980. She later moved to Alberta before settling in Toronto. Annahid is the author of three books: a 2019 self-published memoir Breaking the Ocean, a 2023 collection of essays Bones of Belonging, and a 2026 guide addressing leadership and workplace challenges for BIPOC Leaders Fire and Silence: A Roadmap for BIPOC Leaders.

== Early life ==
Dashtgard was born in Iran to an Iranian father and a British mother. When she was six years old, in 1980, the year after the Iranian Revolution, her family was exiled from Iran and moved to Skellingthorpe, England. Two years later, she moved to Edmonton and then to Toronto. Canada.

== Adult life ==
Dashtgard was a leader in anti–corporate globalization movement during the 1990s. Her filming of the 1999 Seattle WTO protests featured in Florence Pastour's art exhibition at the Old Strathcona Arts Barns in December 1999. She is a co-founder the consulting company Anima Leadership.

Her 2019 memoir Breaking the Ocean: A Memoir of Race, Rebellion, and Reconciliation deals with themes of depression, post-traumatic stress disorder, and racism. The book is divided into three sections titled Race, Rebellion, and Reconciliation. Her 2023 book Bones of Belonging: Finding Wholeness in a White World focusses on everyday racism. In 2026, Annahid released her third book Fire and Silence: A Roadmap for BIPOC Leaders.
