= Helen Lucas =

Canadian painter and writer (1931–2023)

- Born: Helen Geatros; 25 August 1931; Weyburn, Saskatchewan, Canada
- Died: 27 November 2023 (aged 92)
- Education: Ontario College of Art

Helen Lucas LL. D. (née Geatros; August 25, 1931 – November 27, 2023) was a Canadian artist whose work features Greek Orthodox icons, female sexuality, and flowers. Her career as an artist spanned over six decades.

== Early life ==
Helen Geatros was born on August 25, 1931. She was raised in Saskatoon, Saskatchewan, the eldest daughter of parents who had emigrated from Greece. When she was six weeks old her family moved to Saskatchewan to operate the Ritz Hotel. She was never encouraged by her family to do art as they were preoccupied with establishing a new life and a good living in Saskatchewan. The impact of traditional religious observance on her day-to-day life resulted in good manners. After high school Lucas studied pre-medicine for a year before moving to Toronto to study at the Ontario College of Art, where she began to paint. Her parents encouraged this, financially supporting her through college. Though her first show received some positive reviews, she says she was advised by the Greek Church to reduce her artistic endeavours in order to make time for her first love, her devotion to religious studies.

== Career ==
"I will always be drawn to the beauty and the courage of the flower. I am captivated by it. Flowers, more than anything else, are so life enforcing. I have come to truly believe in the healing powers of flowers and their colors in our lives and in our surroundings. I hope each of my paintings will be a continual reminder of the positive qualities that each flower represents."

— Helen Lucas,

Lucas taught at Sheridan College in Oakville, Ontario, as Drawing and Painting Master from 1973 to 1979. While there, she produced a series of political black and white pieces and worked alongside Shelagh Wilkinson, co-founder of Canadian Woman Studies.

Lucas' work is best known for large canvases devoted to colourful flowers, but earlier sketches and paintings explored icons of the Greek Orthodox Church, the Virgin Mary, and female sexuality. The dark nature reflected in Lucas' work during this period has been linked to her deep religious faith, the turmoil of learning to live away from her family in Saskatoon, her guilt at her parents’ financial sacrifice for her education, and the unhappiness she experienced during her 20-year marriage to her first husband. Lucas explains that during this period she "had no feeling for colour." The thematic transition of Lucas' work was chronicled in a film by Donna Davey, Helen Lucas: Her Journey -- Our Journey, which won the Gold Plaque for Best Documentary at the Chicago International Film Festival. The film included an interview with her friend, Margaret Laurence. Lucas's drawings were included in Laurence's book, A Christmas Birthday Story (New York and Toronto, 1980). Laurence described Lucas' contributions as "joyous, beautiful and wise."

In addition to delivering lectures on women in the arts, Lucas appeared on radio and television from the 1970s to the 1990s. She has exhibited her art in Canada, the United States, Europe, Africa, and Japan. Several works were acquired by public collections in Canada and by private international collections. Lucas has published drawings and text in several newspapers, magazines, and journals, and she has been an active participant in Canadian women studies projects.

Lucas lived in King Township, Ontario, where she lived with her second husband, Derek Fuller, until his death in 1996. She died on November 27, 2023, at the age of 92.

=== Awards and distinctions ===
In 2012, she was awarded the Queen Elizabeth II Diamond Jubilee Medal, and was the recipient of an Honorary Doctor of Letters degree by York University in 1991.

== Publications ==
Lucas authored Angelica. Toronto: Kakabeka Pub. Co. 1973. p. 71. OCLC 841465. As well as This is my beloved--sometimes. [Toronto]: Proclaim. 1981. ISBN 9780919415003. OCLC 15918307.
