= Kirk Howard =

Canadian book publisher (1942–2023)

Kirk Howard CM
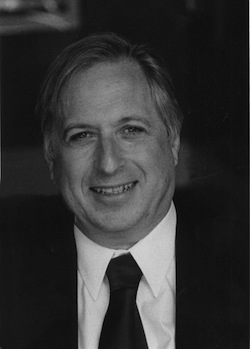
- Born: John Kirk Howard; December 3, 1942; Hamilton, Ontario, Canada
- Died: June 30, 2023 (aged 80); Newmarket, Ontario, Canada
- Occupation: President of Dundurn Press

John Kirk Howard CM (December 3, 1942 – June 30, 2023) was a Canadian book publisher and founder and president of Dundurn Press, one of the largest independently owned publishing houses in Canada. In 2012, Howard became a recipient of the Queen's Diamond Jubilee Medal "for publishing over decades a range of books on Canadian heritage."

== Biography ==
Born in Hamilton, Ontario, Howard began his professional career teaching at a community college in Sarnia. There he helped establish the first Canadian Studies program in Ontario. After attending a speech by Canadian publishing icon Jack McClelland, Howard, who had been frustrated by the lack of books on Canadian history, made the decision to venture into publishing.

Howard was president of the Organization of Book Publishers of Ontario from 2008-2011 where he developed a range of marketing initiatives for both print and ebooks, such as a marketing program to introduce Canadian ebooks to libraries and the development of a web site for the promotion of Canadian books called Open Book Ontario, subsequently established Open Book Ontario Foundation to carry out charitable activities.

From 2004 to 2006, Howard was president of the Association of Canadian Publishers. As president, he took a lead role in introducing ebook technology to Canadian publishers and encouraging member publishers to prepare for the ebook revolution.

Howard died from complications of Parkinson's disease on June 30, 2023, at the age of 80.

== Dundurn Press ==
Howard founded Dundurn Press in 1972. Originally a small press, Dundurn was established with the mandate to supply Canadian readers with books on Canadian history. He named the company after Dundurn Castle, which is located close to where he lived as a child.

Howard oversaw the company’s first major expansion in 1991, after Dundurn Press won a 46-volume contract from the Canadian government to publish the proceedings of the Royal Commission on Electoral Reform and Party Financing. Howard knew that to survive in the Canadian publishing landscape you need to have volume. After expanding his business to meet the contract Howard made a strategic decision to secure Dundurn using this base to purchase important Canadian publishers that were struggling to stay in business.. Over more than twenty five years Howard has increased the business and also preserved many Canadian works by purchasing the companies and keeping the titles actively in print.

In 2008, Howard purchased the Canadian Book Review annual as it struggled to move from annual hard copy books to a digital format. The Canadian Book Review Annual (CBRA) founded in 1975 provides the most comprehensive collection of authoritative reviews of English-language, Canadian-authored scholarly, reference, trade, and books for youths published in Canada. In 2012 after Howard invested in digitizing the reviews he donated it to the University of Toronto Library Services to make it available as an open source database.

Dundurn’s success in Canada's volatile book publishing industry, which in recent years has seen many independent houses closing, has been credited to Howard’s foresight that a publisher requires quantity and accessibility in order to survive.

In later years, Dundurn’s publishing program expanded its original publishing mandate to include illustrated biographies on Canadian art and artists (such as A.Y. Jackson, Lawren Harris, Frederick Varley, and the female artists of the Beaver Hall Group in Montreal), as well as works on important Canadian cultural institutions (such as the National Arts Centre, the Canadian Opera Company, the Stratford Festival, and the National Ballet of Canada). Dundurn has developed a fiction list for both adults and teens (Exile, Six Metres of Pavement, The Third Eye and many others) while still publishing books on facets of Canadian history.

== Canadian Royal Heritage Trust ==
In 2008 Howard was a founding trustee of the Canadian Royal Heritage Trust, a federally registered charity established to encourage the study of Canada’s royal and constitutional heritage. It operates a library and archives at three locations in the country, organizes conferences and talks, and sponsors the Eugene Forsey prize for the best student essay on some aspect of our history.

== Awards and honours ==
- 1984:Government of Ontario Bicentennial Award
- 1989:The President’s Award, Ontario Historical Society, honouring a corporation, business, or executive that has contributed to heritage conservation in the recent past.
- 2002:Queen’s Golden Jubilee Medal
- 2010:Received the inaugural Wilson Prize for Publishing Canadian History by the Wilson Institute at McMaster University.
- 2012:The President’s Award¸ Ontario Historical Society for contributions to Canada’s heritage.
- 2012: Queen’s Diamond Jubilee Medal
- 2015: Janice E. Handford Award (Ontario Book Publishers Organization)

== Commonwealth Book Publishers Association ==
Recently, Howard has undertaken a new initiative: to establish a Commonwealth Association of Book Publishers. He was actively working with the Commonwealth Foundation to create this organization, to facilitate sharing the knowledge of the Canadian publishing experience with other Commonwealth countries trying to establish an indigenous publishing program to preserve their cultural voice and identity.
