= J. A. W. Gunn =

Canadian political philosopher (1937–2023)

J. A. W. Gunn FRSC
- Born: John Alexander Wilson Gunn; 1937
- Died: March 7, 2023 (aged 85); Kingston, Ontario, Canada
- Other name: Jock Gunn

Academic background
- Education: University of Oxford
- Thesis: Interests and the Public Interest in English Social and Political Thought, 1640–1700 (1966)

Academic work
- Discipline: Philosophy
- Sub-discipline: Political philosophy
- Institutions: Queen's University

John Alexander Wilson "Jock" Gunn FRSC (1937 – March 7, 2023) was a Canadian political philosopher.

== Early life and education ==
Gunn earned a Bachelor of Arts in politics and history from Queen's University in 1959 and a Doctor of Philosophy degree from the University of Oxford.

== Academic career ==
Appointed full professor in 1970 at Queen's University, he was head of department 1975 to 1983 and was elected to the Royal Society of Canada in 1983. In 2001, Gunn retired after forty years of service to the university; he was then named the Sir Edward Peacock Professor Emeritus in the Queen's University Department of Political Studies.

His main academic interests included:

- History of thought (chiefly British and French)
- Social-science theories
- Political philosophy

== Death ==
Gunn died on March 7, 2023, at the age of 85.

== Selected bibliography ==
- Politics and the Public Interest in the Seventeenth Century (Routledge and Kegan Paul, 1969).
- Beyond Liberty and Property: The Process of Self-Recognition in Eighteenth-Century Political Thought (McGill-Queen's University Press, 1983).
- When the French Tried to Be British: Party, Opposition, and the Quest for Civil Disagreement, 1814–1848 (McGill-Queen's University Press, 2009).
