= Fred la marmotte =

Groundhog in Quebec, Canada, that celebrates Groundhog Day

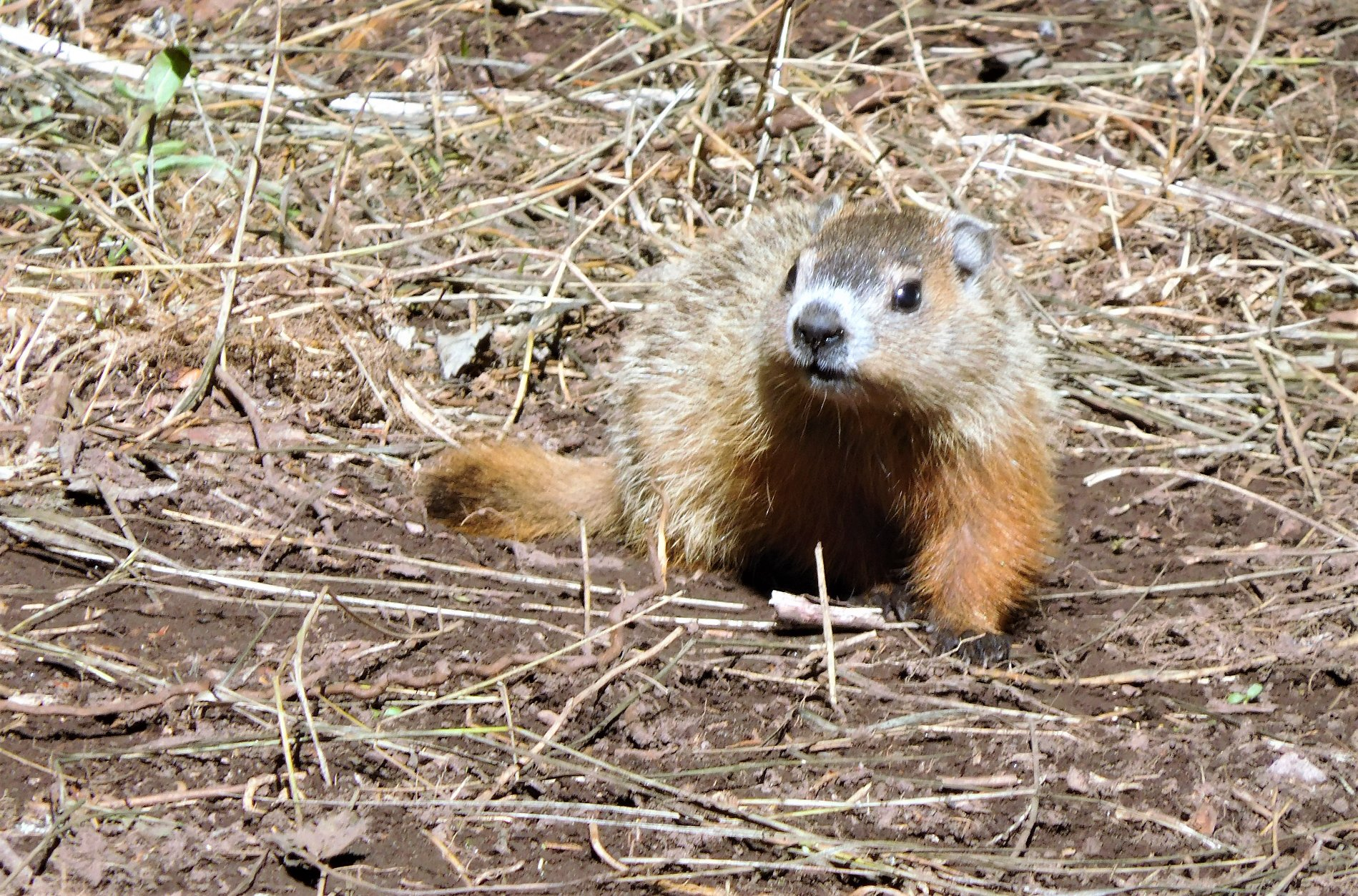
Fred la marmotte in 2020.

Fred la marmotte (French: Fred the Marmot, lit. 'Fred the Groundhog') is a groundhog located in Val-d'Espoir near Percé, Quebec, whose behaviour is used to predict weather on Groundhog Day. Fred is the official groundhog of Quebec for Groundhog Day predictions. The name "Fred la marmotte" is passed to a succession of groundhogs that are replaced as they retire or die.

== Usage of Fred ==
According to the tradition of Groundhog Day, if the enlisted groundhog sees its shadow, then spring will be delayed; if it does not see its shadow, then spring will be early.

Fred was the only groundhog located on a World Heritage Site to be used for Groundhog Day weather prediction.

== Succession of Freds ==
The original Fred, "Gros Fred" ("Big Fred"; also called "Fred Sénior"), was engaged from 2010 to 2017 and again in 2019; his son "Petit Fred" ("Little Fred") stood in for the 2018 event. The succeeding Fred, son of "Fred Sénior" ("Fred Senior", the original Fred) was found dead on February 2, 2023, coincidentally on Groundhog Day. The next year, a new Fred predicted an early spring.

== Past predictions ==
2010	"Late spring"
2011	"Late spring"
2012	"Late spring"
2013	"Long winter"
2014	"Early spring"
2015	"Long winter"
2016	"Late spring"
2017	"Early spring"
2018	"Early spring"
2019	"Late spring"
2020	"Early spring"
2021	"Early spring"
2022	"Late spring"
2023	"Long winter"
2024	"Early spring"
2025	“Long winter”
2026	"Early spring"

== See also ==
- Oracular animal
