= Reno Salvail =

Canadian artist and photographer (1947–2023)

- Born: 1947; Plessisville, Quebec, Canada
- Died: 2 June 2023 (aged 75); Quebec City, Quebec, Canada
- Education: École des beaux-arts de Québec; Aix-Marseille University
- Occupations: Artist, photographer

Reno Salvail (1947 – 2 June 2023) was a Canadian artist, photographer, and author.

== Biography ==
Born in Plessisville in 1947, Salvail studied at the École des beaux-arts de Québec. He then taught semiology at Cégep de Matane for several years, starting in 1972. He also taught at Cégep de Sainte-Foy from 1993 to 2013. In 2001, he earned a doctorate in plastic arts and art sciences from Aix-Marseille University with a thesis titled Processus narratifs et modes de l'art-fiction dans une démarche contemporaine en arts visuels : (installations et multi médias) ou l'aventure de la création.

Salvail practiced installation art, land art, photography, and videography. For more than 40 years, he was active in exhibiting his works now visible at the Musée national des beaux-arts du Québec. In his art, he found inspiration in the natural elements such as volcanic sites, particularly seen in Rivières de feu, in which he defended his ecological views.

Reno Salvail died in Quebec City on 2 June 2023, at the age of 75.

== Publications ==
- Le Passage de la Grande Ourse (2003)
- Je suis devenu le volcan (2024)

== Expositions ==
- Lumières-images, Galerie d'art de Matane, Matane, QC, Canada (1976)
- Extraordinaires spécimens, Galerie d'art de Matane, Matane, QC, Canada (1983)
- U-Topos, Galerie d'art de Matane, Matane, QC, Canada (1985)
- Les aventures de L'Œil de Poisson en Écosse : Reno Salvail : Les balises du sentier de Strathdon «Le chariot d'Arthur», L'Œil de Poisson, Québec, QC, Canada (1999)
- La Trace du lièvre, massif des Trois-Évêchés, Cairn centre d’art, Digne-les-bains, France (2005)
- Les rivières de feu, La bande vidéo, Québec, QC, Canada (2010)
- Les rivières de feu, Centre VU, Québec, QC, Canada (2008)

La constellation du pied dans le cadre de la Manif d’art 9 - Biennale de Québec, Québec, QC, Canada (2018) Renaud, Centre d’art le Carré 150, Victoriaville, QC, Canada (2022)
