= Bernard Lemaire =

Canadian businessman (1936–2023)

Bernard Lemaire OC
- Born: May 6, 1936; Drummondville, Quebec, Canada
- Died: November 8, 2023 (aged 87)
- Occupation: Businessman

Bernard Lemaire OC (May 6, 1936 – November 8, 2023) was a Canadian businessman. He was the Chairman of the Board of Cascades Inc., a Canadian manufacturer of packaging products, tissue products, and fine papers products.

== Biography ==
Born in Drummondville, Quebec, Lemaire studied civil engineering at the Université de Sherbrooke and McGill University. In 1960, he joined the family recycling business, Drummond Pulp & Fibre. In 1963, along with his father and brother, Laurent, he founded Papier Cascades Inc. (which later became Cascades Inc.). He was President and Chief Executive Officer of the company until 1992.

Under Lemaire's presidency Cascades grew from a small paper mill in Kingsey Falls, Quebec, into a multi-national company with 90 plants and 11,000 employees in Canada, the United States and France.

In 1987, he was made an Officer of the Order of Canada, the centrepiece of Canada's honours system which recognizes a lifetime of achievement and merit of a high degree, especially in service to Canada or to humanity at large. In 2002, he was awarded the Chevalier de l'Ordre national de la Légion d'honneur of France.

Upon his retirement from Cascades, Lemaire began a cattle ranch that quickly grew to 1,000 head of highland cattle. His natural, hormone-free cattle are still marketed at the local grocery stores, IGA, Avril Health Supermarkets, butchers and restaurants.

Lemaire died on November 8, 2023, at the age of 87.
