= William D. Coleman (scientist) =

Canadian political scientist (1950–2023)

- Born: 1950
- Died: March 24, 2023 (aged 72); Hamilton, Ontario, Canada

Academic background
- Education: Carleton University (BA); University of Chicago (MA, PhD)
- Thesis: A structural approach to the study of political change with a case study of the movement towards independence in Quebec since 1949 (1979)

Academic work
- Institutions: University of Waterloo; McMaster University

William D. Coleman (1950 – March 24, 2023) was a Canadian political scientist. Until his death, he was a professor University of Waterloo, having previously been the IGI Chair and University Distinguished Professor at McMaster University.

Coleman died on March 24, 2023, at the age of 72.
