= Roslyn Swartzman =

Canadian printmaker (1931–2023)

- Born: Roslyn Sheinfeld; August 18, 1931; Montreal, Quebec, Canada
- Died: February 5, 2023 (aged 91)
- Spouse: Monte Swartzman (m. 1950)

Roslyn Swartzman (née Sheinfeld; August 18, 1931 – February 5, 2023) was a Canadian printmaker, painter, and sculptor.

== Career ==
Swartzman studied at the Montreal Artists School with Ghitta Caiserman-Roth and Alfred Pinsky (1947–1948); at the Montreal Museum of Fine Arts with Arthur Lismer and Jacques de Tonnancour (1956–1957); and printmaking at the École des Beaux-Arts, Montreal, with Albert Dumouchel (1960–1964). Until 1950, she signed her work with her maiden name of Sheinfeld.

Swartzman exhibited her work nationally and internationally, in over 30 group exhibitions, and over 20 solo exhibitions beginning in 1959 and in 2006, the Saidye Bronfman Centre for the Arts, Montreal celebrated her career with an exhibition titled Roslyn Swartzman: Forty Year Retrospective: Prints, Sculptures and Drawings. Her public commissions in Montreal include Oiseau de feu (1991), a 22 metre long abstract sculpture with 81 pieces of brightly coloured painted aluminum that hangs on a wall in Place Bonaventure; others are installed at the Place Alexis Nihon, and at the Spanish and Portuguese and Chevra Kadisha synagogues. She was a member of the Canadian Society of Graphic Art, the Prints and Drawings Council of Canada, the Royal Canadian Academy of Arts and the Society of Canadian Painter-Etchers and Engravers. She also was a teacher and later director of the Graphics Art Department at the Saidye Bronfman Centre for the Arts, Montreal, from mid-1960s to its closing in 2006.

Swartzman died on February 5, 2023, at the age of 91.

== Selected collections ==
Swartzman's work is included in the permanent collections of the Musée national des beaux-arts du Québec and the National Gallery of Canada, among others.
