= Eric McCormack (writer) =

Scottish-born Canadian author (1938–2023)

- Born: Eric Patrick McCormack; 20 September 1938; Bellshill, Scotland
- Died: 9 May 2023 (aged 84); Kingston, Ontario, Canada
- Writing career
- Genres: Absurdist fiction, mystery fiction, Gothic
- Movement: Postmodernism

Eric Patrick McCormack (20 September 1938 – 9 May 2023) was a Scottish-born Canadian author. He was known for works blending absurdism, existentialism, crime fiction, gothic horror and the search for identity and personal meaning in works such as Inspecting the Vaults (1987), The Paradise Motel (1989), The Mysterium (1992), First Blast of the Trumpet Against the Monstrous Regiment of Women (1997) and The Dutch Wife (2002).

== Biography ==
McCormack was born in Bellshill, Scotland, an impoverished industrial community located 32 kilometres outside Glasgow where his father worked in a steel mill. McCormack took a master's degree in English literature from the University of Glasgow, then taught at a high school in Muirkirk, Scotland, a mining town. In 1966, he went to the University of Manitoba in Winnipeg, Manitoba, where he wrote his PhD on Robert Burton's Anatomy of Melancholy. He joined the English Department of St. Jerome's University in 1970, where he remained until his retirement.

McCormack wrote short stories in addition to his academic work, and in the 1980s published them in small literary journals such as Prism International, Malahat Review and The New Quarterly. His first book, Inspecting the Vaults, released in 1987, is a collection of these stories. One short story in particular, "Sad Stories in Patagonia", which describes a family tragedy, formed the basis of his next book, The Paradise Motel, which was published in 1989, and is mentioned in most of the other books that follow.

McCormack died on 9 May 2023, at the age of 84.

== Writing ==
As an academic, McCormack's writings tend to be informed by the types of 17th century works that have been his academic focus, but they also encompass shadowy worlds of criminality, violence (often family violence), natural and human-invented tragedy, and magic realism. He also favours telling the adventures of an individual by describing his or her roots (and that of his forefathers), and then traveling with him through life and its adventures.

Many of McCormack's books were set in Camberloo, Ontario, a fictional name for a town similar to Waterloo and Cambridge, Ontario.

=== Themes ===
There are several recurring themes in McCormack's books. Besides the recurring theme of "Sad Tales of Patagonia" and its tale of murder and mutilation, McCormack's heroes tend to have an academic/bookish bent, been born in Scotland, and have settled in the same part of Canada that he did. They also travel extensively, often by ship, and meet eccentric fellow travelers who relate to them their life stories and interests. Many of these travelers come to tragic ends themselves.

McCormack's reappearing subjects are:

- coincidence
- frequent portrayal of an ascetic life
- a sense of imminent disaster
- writing/story telling, metafiction
- intertextuality

== Works ==
=== Inspecting the Vaults (1987) ===
Inspecting the Vaults contains an introduction and 20 short stories. It was re-published in 1993 by Penguin in an edition that included the novel The Paradise Motel.

=== The Paradise Motel (1989) ===
The Paradise Motel is about Ezra Stevenson, who hears the tale of family murder and mutilation recounted in "Sad Stories of Patagonia" from his grandfather, Ezra Stevenson. He makes it his life mission to find out what happened to the four survivors of the tragedy, and the book follows his quest in four sections, each named for one of the survivors.

=== The Mysterium (1993) ===
The Mysterium is a "metafictional detective" or "anti-detective" story in the vein of Umberto Eco's The Name of the Rose.

=== First Blast of the Trumpet Against The Monstrous Regiment of Women (1997) ===
First Blast of the Trumpet Against the Monstrous Regiment of Women takes its inspiration from The First Blast of the Trumpet Against the Monstrous Regiment of Women by Scottish Reformer John Knox, which was published in 1558. The book concerns the birth, life and travels of an orphan, who encounters a bookish sailor who shows him Knox's book, among others. It also concerns the woman that the protagonist meets in the course of his life before he finally settles in Camberloo, Ontario.

=== The Dutch Wife (2002) ===
The Dutch Wife concerns a man whose mother married two men who bore the same name. He embarks on a journey across the world to discover the truth behind this unusual situation.

=== Cloud (2014) ===
McCormack's last novel Cloud was published in August 2014.

== Awards ==
- 1988 Commonwealth Writers Prize in the Canada Caribbean Region for Inspecting the Vaults
- 1990 Spring Book Award from the Scottish Arts Council for The Paradise Motel
- 1990 nominated for the People's Prize for Fiction
- 1997 nominated for the Governor General's Award for First Blast of the Trumpet Against the Monstrous Regiment of Women
- 1999 The Literacy Award at the K-W Arts Awards Ceremony

== Published works ==
=== Fiction ===
- Inspecting the Vaults (1987) (short stories)
- The Paradise Motel (1989) (fiction)
- The Mysterium (1993) (fiction)
- First Blast of the Trumpet Against the Monstrous Regiment of Women (1997)
- The Dutch Wife (2002)
- Cloud (2014)
