= Selwyn Romilly =

Canadian judge (1939/1940 – 2023)

The Honourable Selwyn Romilly

Justice of the Supreme Court of British Columbia
- In office November 1995 – 2015

Justice of the Provincial Court of British Columbia
- In office November 15, 1974 – 1978

Personal details
- Born: 1939/1940 Port-of-Spain, Trinidad and Tobago
- Died: 22 September 2023 (aged 83)
- Children: 2
- Education: University of British Columbia, (B.A.); Peter A. Allard School of Law, (LLB)
- Profession: Lawyer

Selwyn Romilly (1939/1940 – 22 September 2023) was a Canadian judge. He was appointed to the Supreme Court of British Columbia in November 1995, becoming the first black judge named to that court.

== Early life ==
Romilly was born in 1939 or 1940, in Trinidad and Tobago. He attended the Queen's Royal College in Port-of-Spain and shortly thereafter immigrated to Canada.

== Education ==
Romilly received a Bachelor of Arts from University of British Columbia (UBC) and entered law school in 1963, earning his LLB from the Peter A. Allard School of Law in 1966. At the time, Romilly was only the fourth Black student to have entered law at UBC.

== Law career ==
Following his education, Romilly practised as a lawyer from 1967 until 1974. He first worked in Kamloops, and then Prince Rupert. He eventually relocated to Smithers.

In 1972, Romilly was offered a seat on the bench of the provincial court of the province by Deputy Attorney General Dave Vickers but turned the offer down. Romilly was offered the position again and was then appointed a judge of the Provincial Court of British Columbia, effective 15 November 1974. He served until 1978. He was the first Black person to be appointed a judge at this level of court.

In November 1995, Romilly was appointed to the Supreme Court of British Columbia, becoming the first Black judge named to that court. He retired from the Supreme Court in 2015.

In August 2003, Romilly ordered the extradition of former SS guard Michael Seifert from Canada to Italy for a conviction of war crimes taking part at Bolzano Transit Camp during World War II.

== Racial profiling incident ==
On 14 May 2021, Romilly was wrongfully detained by officers of the Vancouver Police Department while out on a morning walk. The officers were looking for a "dark-skinned" suspect in his 40s or 50s.

Following the incident, Vancouver Mayor Kennedy Stewart apologized to Romilly, condemning systemic racism present in the police force.

Romilly, speaking with Global News, said:

I thought things had changed and they haven’t... I hate to say racial profiling, but I can’t help but think if it was an 81-year-old white man, regardless of the description, they wouldn’t have put him in handcuffs for ‘officer safety'.

== Personal life and death ==
Romilly moved to Smithers, British Columbia, where he married his wife Lorna. They had two children.

Selwyn Romilly died on 22 September 2023, at the age of 83.

== Awards and honours ==
- 1996 – Congress of Black Women of Canada, for public service
- 1997 – Canadian Association of Black Lawyers, award
- 2008 – Black Law Students Association of Canada, distinguished public service award
