= Peter W. Hutchins =

Canadian legal scholar (1945–2023)

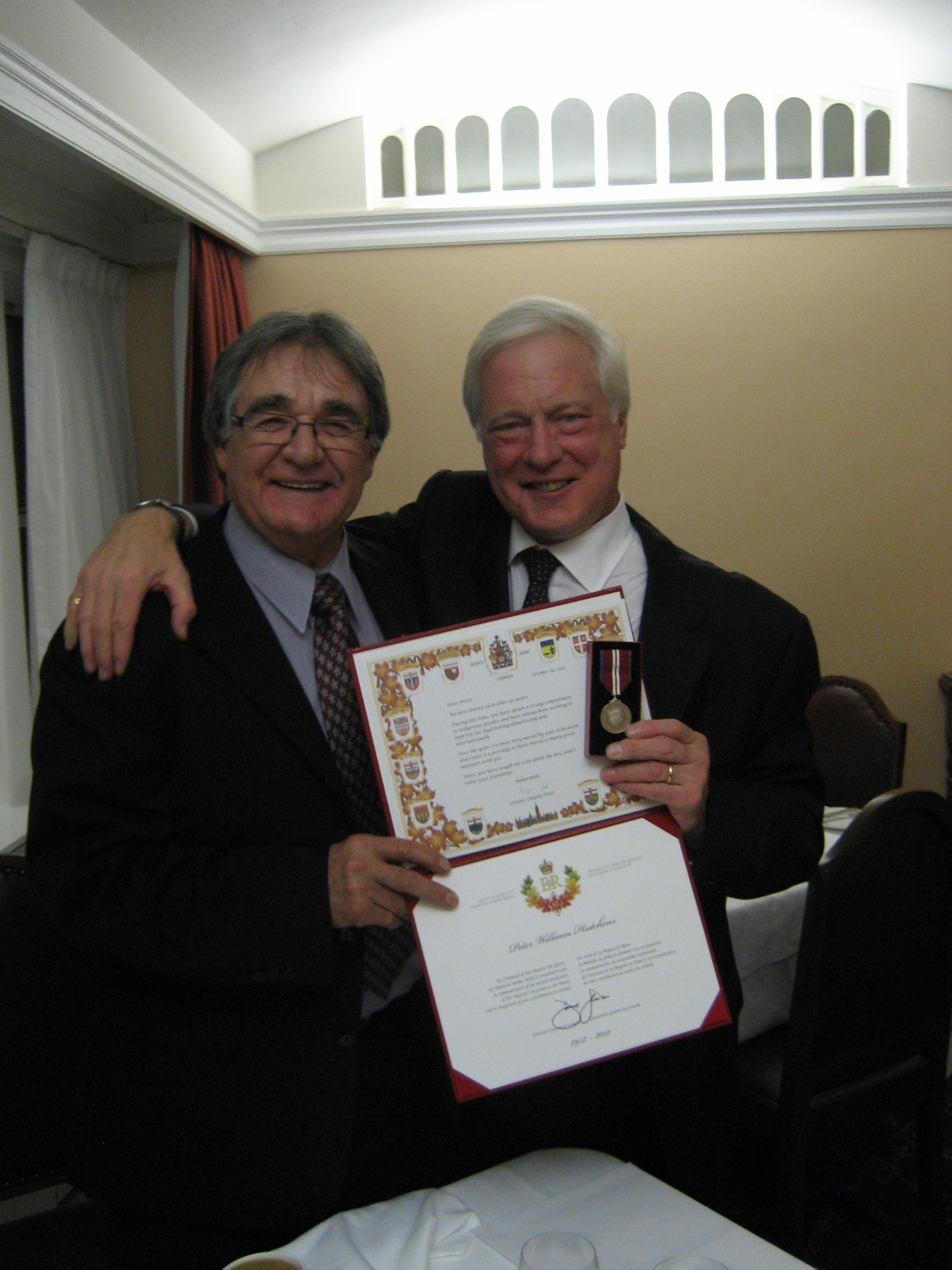
- Senator Charlie Watt (left) presenting Peter W. Hutchins (right) with the Queen Elizabeth II Diamond Jubilee Medal in 2012
- Born: Peter William Hutchins; November 6, 1945
- Died: January 13, 2023 (aged 77)
- Education: McGill University (BA); Université Laval (LL.L); London School of Economics (LL.M)
- Spouse: Alexandra Hutchins
- Children: 1

Peter William Hutchins (November 6, 1945 – January 13, 2023) was a Canadian lawyer specializing in Canadian Aboriginal law. He was "one of [Canada's] top litigators in aboriginal cases".

== Early life and academic career ==
Hutchins received a bachelor of arts at McGill University, followed then by his legal education at Université Laval in Quebec City where he obtained an LL.L and at the London School of Economics, University of London where he received an LL.M in international law. In 1980 he created for the Faculty of Law, McGill University, the course Aboriginal Peoples and the Law, which he continued to teach until 1996.

== Legal career ==
As a litigator, Hutchins appeared before the Supreme Court of Canada, the Federal Court of Canada, the courts of Quebec, Ontario, British Columbia, Manitoba, New Brunswick, Newfoundland, the Northwest Territories, as well as the United Nations Human Rights Committee and the Inter-American Commission on Human Rights. In addition to litigating, he worked to improve the litigation process, notably by advocating that expert witness be less partisan and more independent.

He was involved in negotiations concerning historic and contemporary treaties between First Nations and the Crown in right of Canada. Hutchins advised the Federal and Territorial governments on Aboriginal governance and treaty implementation issues. He lectured and wrote on the Inuit and arctic sovereignty.

=== James Bay and Northern Quebec Agreement ===
Hutchins acted for the Cree of northern Quebec during the negotiation of the James Bay and Northern Quebec Agreement, which upon its conclusion in 1975 became the first modern treaty between the Crown and a Canadian First Nation.

=== Supreme Court of Canada litigation ===
Hutchins appeared before the Supreme Court of Canada in numerous cases relating to Canadian Aboriginal law:

- R. v. Sioui (re confirmation of the validity of the Huron-British Treaty of 1760)
- Bear Island Foundation v. Attorney General for the Province of Ontario (re Aboriginal Rights, formation of treaties)
- Friends of the Oldman River Society v. The Queen (re Treaty Rights, application of federal environmental regimes, federal fiduciary duty)
- Adams v. Her Majesty the Queen (re Aboriginal Rights in Southern Quebec and the application of the Royal Proclamation of 1763)
- R. v. Nikal (re the Sparrow test and licensing of Aboriginal fishing, Aboriginal self-governance over fisheries)
- Reference Re: Secession of Quebec (re the position of Aboriginal peoples in the context of a Quebec unilateral secession)
- Mitchell v. M.N.R. (re the Aboriginal right to bring personal and community goods across the Canada-U.S. border without paying duties or taxes)
- David Beckman, in his capacity as Director, Agriculture Branch, Department of Energy, Mines and Resources, et al. v. Little Salmon/Carmacks First Nation, et al. (re whether there is a duty to consult and, where possible, accommodate First Nations’ concerns and interests in the context of a modern comprehensive land claims agreement)
- Succession Rolland Bastien v. Her Majesty the Queen (re Treaty rights and immunity from taxation of property situated on reserve)
- Rio Tinto Alcan Inc., et al. v. Carrier Sekani Tribal Council (re Constitutional law, Honour of Crown and Duty to consult and accommodate Aboriginal peoples prior to decisions that might adversely affect their Aboriginal rights and title claims)

== Memberships and Associations ==
Hutchins was a member of the Barreau du Quebec from 1970. He was a founding member and past-chair of the Canadian Bar Association National Aboriginal Law Section. He has been a member of the Federal Court Statutory Rules Committee since 2006 and its Sub-Committee on Expert Evidence. He was a member of the Canadian Bar Association, the American Bar Association, the International Bar Association, the Canadian Council on International Law, the American Society of International Law, the International Commission of Jurists and the International Law Association.

== Publications ==
Hutchins authored or co-authored numerous peer reviewed articles:

- “Holding the Mirror Up to Nature: Law, Social Science, and Professor Arthur Ray”, the introduction to Telling It to The Judge: Taking Native History to Court, by Arthur J. Ray, published in 2011 by UBC Press
- “Cede, Release and Surrender: Treaty-Making, the Aboriginal Perspective and the Great Juridical Oxymoron Or Let's Face it - It Didn't Happen”, Chapter 16 to Aboriginal Law Since Delgamuukw, ed. Maria Morellato, published in 2009 by Canada Law Book
- “Power and Principles: State-Indigenous Relations across Time and Space”, the conclusion to Aboriginal Title and Indigenous Peoples: Canada, Australia, and New Zealand, published in 2010 by UBC Press
- “From Calder to Mitchell: Should the Courts Patrol Cultural Borders” 16 Supreme Court Law Review (2d) (2002)
- “When Do Fiduciary Obligations to Aboriginal People Arise?” 59 Saskatchewan Law Review 97 (1995)
- “The Aboriginal Right to Self-Government and the Canadian Constitution: the Ghost in the Machine” 29 University of British Columbia Law Review 251 (1995)

== Awards ==
In 2012, Hutchins was awarded the Queen Elizabeth II Diamond Jubilee Medal by Senator Charlie Watt for his career dedicated to advancing the rights of aboriginal people.

Hutchins was repeatedly listed as a leading practitioner in Aboriginal Law by Best Lawyer and as "most frequently recommended" in The Canadian Legal Lexpert Directory.

== Personal life and death ==
Hutchins was married and had one child. He died on January 13, 2023.
