= Dundurn Press =

Canadian publishing company

- Founded: 1972
- Founder: Kirk Howard
- Country of origin: Canada
- Headquarters location: Toronto
- Distribution: UTP Distribution (Canada); Ingram Publisher Services (US); Lightning Source (UK)
- Key people: Meghan Macdonald (Publisher)
- Imprints: Dundurn, Rare Machines, Castle Street Mysteries, Hounslow, Simon and Pierre, Boardwalk Books, Sandcastle Books, Natural Heritage, Napoleon and Co., Blue Butterfly, Thomas Allen Publishers
- No. of employees: 20+
- Official website: www.dundurn.com

Dundurn Press is one of the largest Canadian-owned book publishing companies of adult fiction and non-fiction. The company publishes Canadian literature, history, biography, politics and arts. Dundurn has about 2500 books in print, and averages around fifty new titles each year. Dundurn Press was established in 1972 by Kirk Howard. In 2009, Dundurn forged a co-publishing partnership with the Ontario Genealogical Society, and in 2011, Dundurn purchased Napoleon & Company and Blue Butterfly Books. In 2013, Dundurn acquired Thomas Allen Publishers, the publishing branch of Thomas Allen & Son Limited.

Dundurn Press authors include Lincoln Alexander, Linda McQuaig, Ted Barris, Michael Coren, Xue Yiwei, and Austin Clarke.

In January 2019, Howard sold Dundurn Press to a consortium of Canadian technology investors. They hired Kwame Scott Fraser as publisher, and Howard became publisher emeritus. Acquiring editor Russell Smith launched a new imprint for literary fiction and memoir called Rare Machines.

Kirk Howard died of Parkinson's disease in June 2023.

In February 2024, Fraser changed roles within the firm, and Meghan Macdonald was named publisher.
