= Tom Beynon (Canadian football) =

Canadian football player (1941–2023)

Profile
- Positions: Guard, Tackle

Personal information
- Born: July 13, 1941; Kitchener, Ontario, Canada
- Died: June 26, 2023 (aged 81)
- Listed height: 6 ft 3 in (1.91 m)
- Listed weight: 240 lb (109 kg)

Career history
- 1966–1967: Saskatchewan Roughriders
- 1968–1970: Ottawa Rough Riders

Awards and highlights
- Grey Cup champion (1966, 1968, 1969)

Thomas Dwyer Beynon (July 13, 1941 – June 26, 2023) was a Canadian professional football player who played for the Saskatchewan Roughriders and Ottawa Rough Riders. He won the Grey Cup with Saskatchewan in 1966 and with Ottawa in 1968 and 1969. He previously played football and studied at Queen's University. After his football career he became a lawyer in Waterloo, Ontario.

Beynon died on June 26, 2023, at the age of 81.
