= Hôpital Saint-François d'Assise =

- Centre hospitalier universitaire de Québec
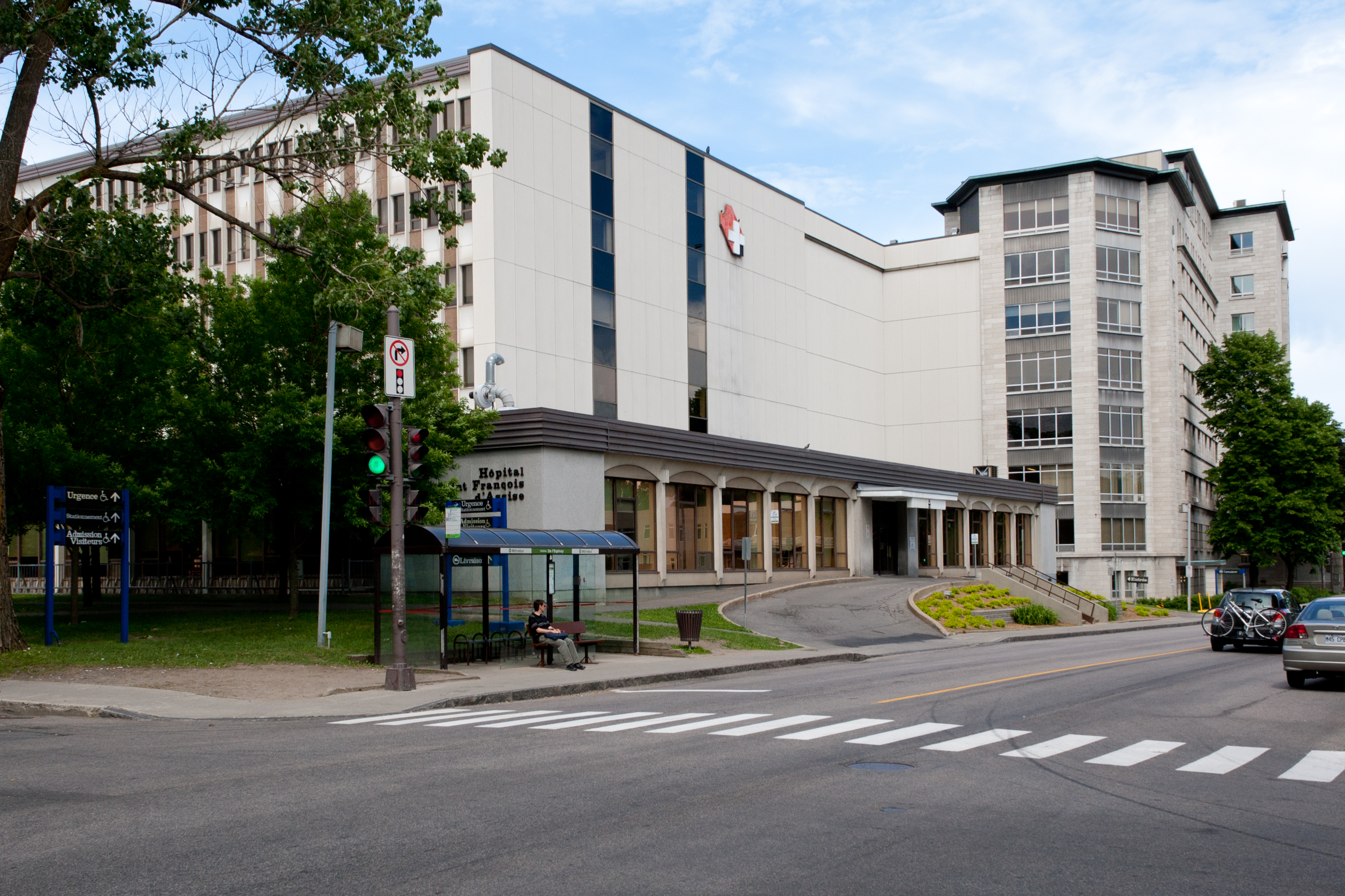

Geography
- Location: Quebec City, Quebec, Canada
- Coordinates: 46.8279°N 71.2366°W

Organization
- Care system: Public Medicare (Canada)
- Type: Teaching
- Affiliated university: Laval University

Services
- Emergency department: Yes

History
- Founded: 1912
- Closed: December 1995 merged into Centre hospitalier universitaire de Québec

Links
- Website: www.chuq.qc.ca/fr/le_chuq/nos_etablissements/hsfa/
- Lists: Hospitals in Canada

Hôpital Saint-François d'Assise (French pronunciation: [opital sɛ̃ fʁɑ̃swa dasiz]) is one three teaching hospitals affiliated with the medical school of Université Laval and several specialized institutions in Quebec City, Quebec, Canada.

The hospital merged in December 1995 with two other teaching hospitals to form Centre hospitalier universitaire de Québec:

- Hôtel-Dieu de Québec
- Centre hospitalier de l'Université Laval
