= Institut Philippe-Pinel de Montréal =

Institut national de psychiatrie légale Philippe-Pinel
- Université de Montréal Faculty of Medicine
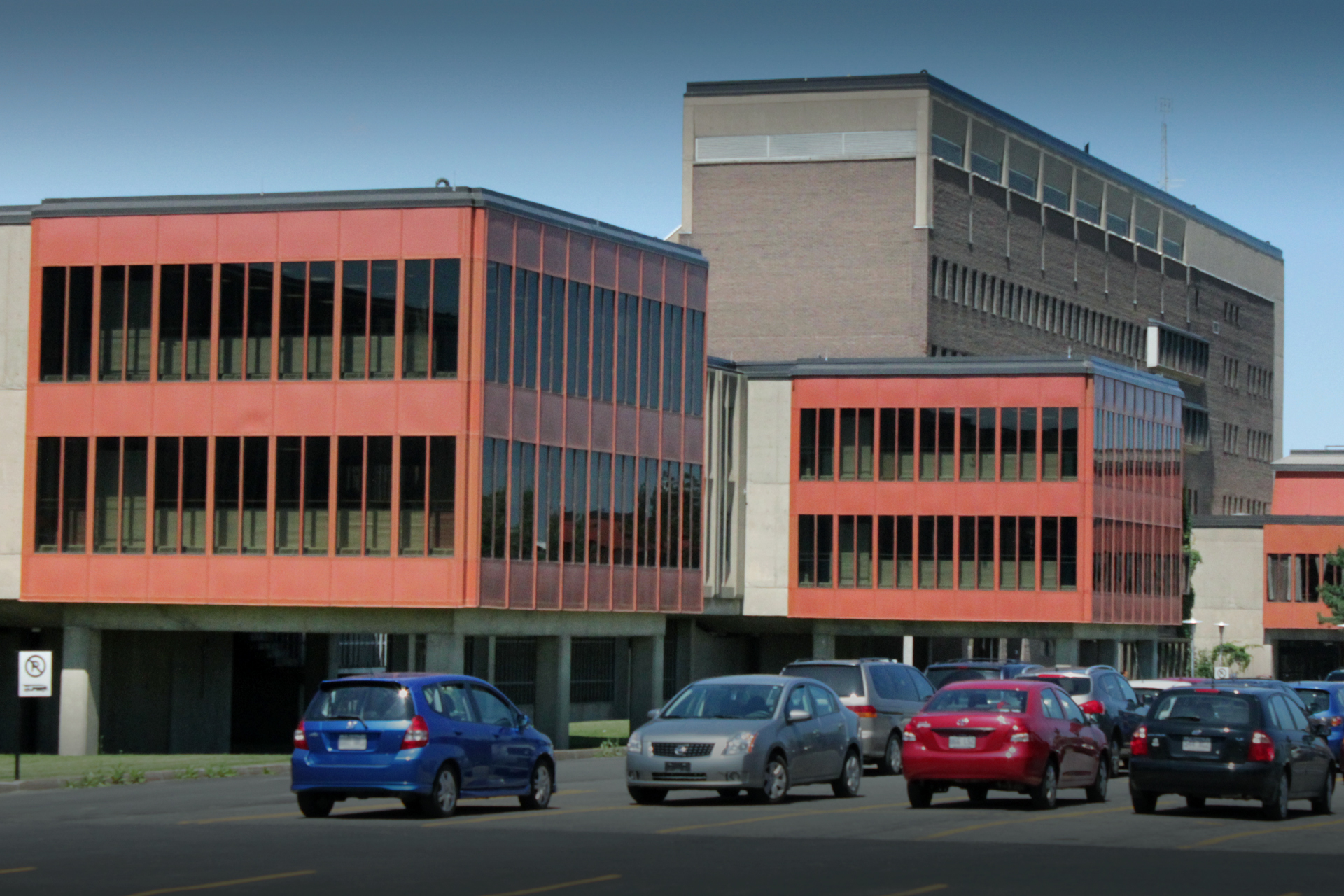

- Location within Montreal

Geography
- Location: 10905 Henri-Bourassa Blvd. East, Montreal, Quebec, Canada
- Coordinates: 45.655833°N 73.533889°W

Organization
- Care system: RAMQ (Quebec medicare)
- Type: Teaching
- Affiliated university: Université de Montréal Faculty of Medicine

Services
- Speciality: Psychiatric hospital

History
- Founded: 1970

Links
- Website: pinel.qc.ca
- Lists: Hospitals in Canada

The Institut national de psychiatrie légale Philippe-Pinel is a psychiatric hospital located in Montreal, Quebec, for individuals accused of crimes and found to be not criminally responsible due to mental disorder. It is located at 10905 Henri Bourassa Blvd. East in the borough of Rivière-des-Prairies–Pointe-aux-Trembles.

== History ==
The institute was founded in 1970, a time when legal psychiatry was a new science and the government was searching for new methods of managing psychiatric cases that were difficult to treat.

In March 2009, a class action lawsuit against the hospital was settled out of court for $1 million.

== Overview ==
The Pinel Institute rehabilitates patients with both psychiatric and judicial problems. It is affiliated with Université de Montréal and several colleges.

The institute offers external clinical services as well as a program for sexual delinquents. Both men and women are admitted, but men make up a much larger percentage of the total population at the hospital. The danger posed by the patients is determined by consultations with clinician. Over 3,000 books are conserved in its documentation services.

== Missions ==
The four parts of the Pinel Institute's Mission:

- Evaluation of patients
- Education of medical residents and students
- Psychological and biological research on the causes of violence
- Prevention of violence
