= Centre hospitalier de l'Université Laval =

Coordinates: 46.7684°N 71.2824°W

- Centre hospitalier universitaire de Québec
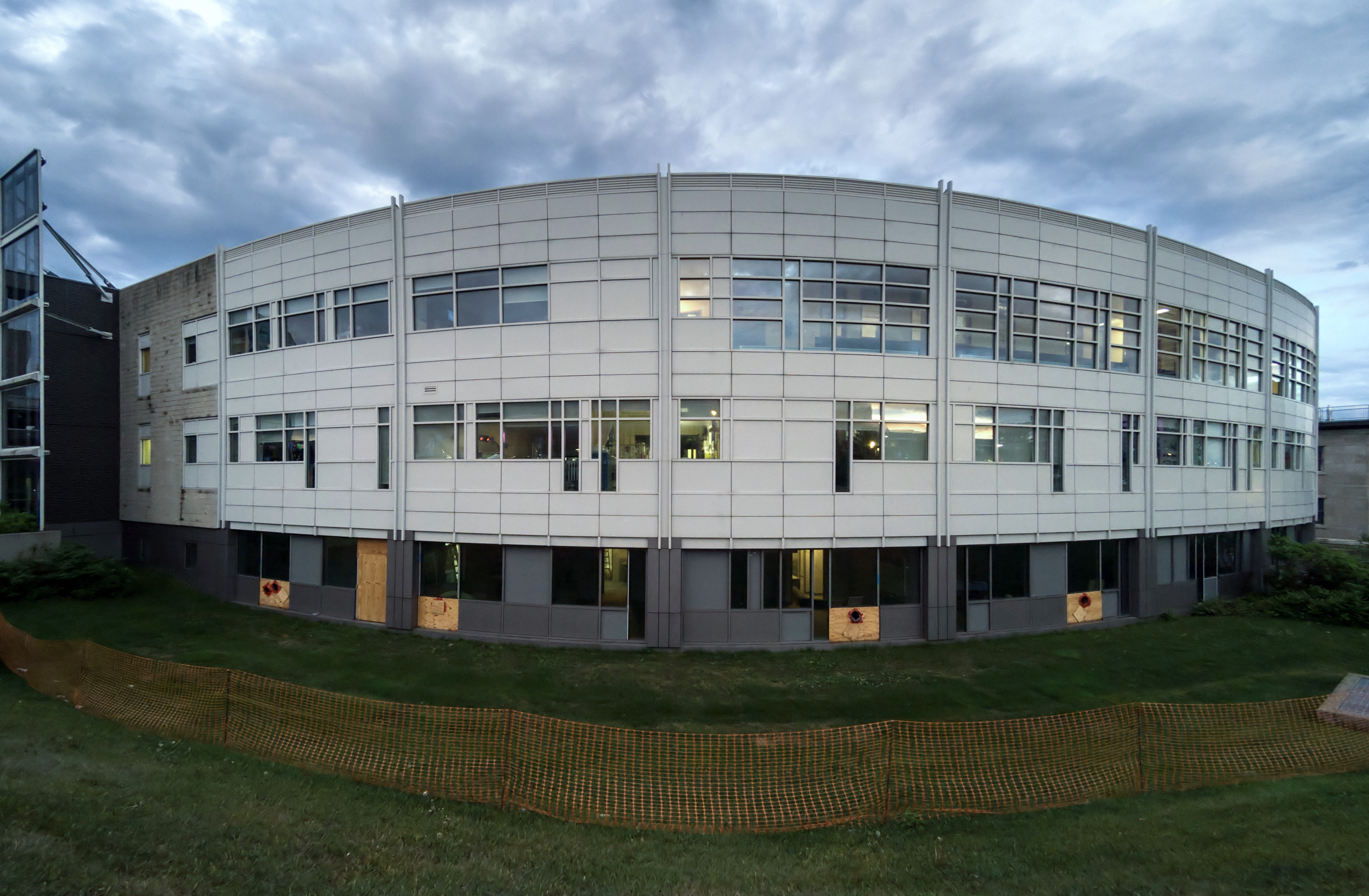

Geography
- Location: Quebec City, Quebec, Canada

Organisation
- Care system: Medicare
- Type: Teaching
- Affiliated university: Laval University

Services
- Emergency department: Level II trauma centre
- Speciality: pediatrics, emergency medicine

History
- Founded: 1951

Links
- Website: http://www.chuq.qc.ca/fr/le_chuq/nos_etablissements/chul/

Centre hospitalier de l'Université Laval (French pronunciation: [sɑ̃tʁ ɔspitalje də lynivɛʁsite laval]) merged in December 1995 with two other teaching hospitals to form Centre hospitalier universitaire de Québec:

- Hôtel-Dieu de Québec
- Hôpital Saint-François d'Assise
