= Centre hospitalier universitaire de Québec =

Geography
- Location: Quebec City, Quebec, Canada

Organization
- Care system: Public Medicare (Canada)
- Type: Teaching
- Affiliated university: Laval University

Services
- Emergency department: Level II trauma centre (Hôtel-Dieu de Québec, CHUL, adults), Level I trauma centre (CHUL, pediatrics)
- Speciality: Pediatric hospital

History
- Founded: 1995

Links
- Website: www.chuq.qc.ca
- Lists: Hospitals in Canada

Centre Hospitalier Universitaire de Québec (French pronunciation: [sɑ̃tʁ ɔspitalje ynivɛʁsitɛːʁ də kebɛk]; CHUQ) is a network of three teaching hospitals affiliated with the medical school of Université Laval and several specialized institutions in Quebec City, Canada. It was created by the merger in December 1995 of three large teaching hospitals:

- Hôtel-Dieu de Québec
- Hôpital Saint-François d'Assise
- Centre hospitalier de l'Université Laval (CHUL)

It also includes:

- Maison Paul-Triquet
- Centre de l'ouïe et de la parole (Hearing and Speech Centre)
- Centre de traitement dans la communauté (Community Treatment Centre)
- Centre de pédopsychiatrie (Child and Youth Psychiatry Centre)
- Foyer des vétérans (Veterans' Home)

The Centre hospitalier de l'Université Laval site offers extensive and specialized pediatric services.

The CHU de Québec Research Center houses a Biosafety level 3 laboratory for pathogens of human and animal provenance.

CHUQ is the largest institutional employer in Quebec City: its staff includes 672 specialist doctors, 237 family doctors, 2659 nurses, 96 pharmacists, 19 dentists, and 1492 other health care professionals and technicians.
