= Almonaster (disambiguation) =

Almonaster or Almonester may refer to:

- Almonaster la Real, town in Spain
- Don Andres Almonaster y Rojas
- Micaela Almonester, Baroness de Pontalba
- Almonaster Avenue, in New Orleans, Louisiana, U.S.
  - Almonaster Avenue Bridge
