= Hilary Griffiths =

British conductor

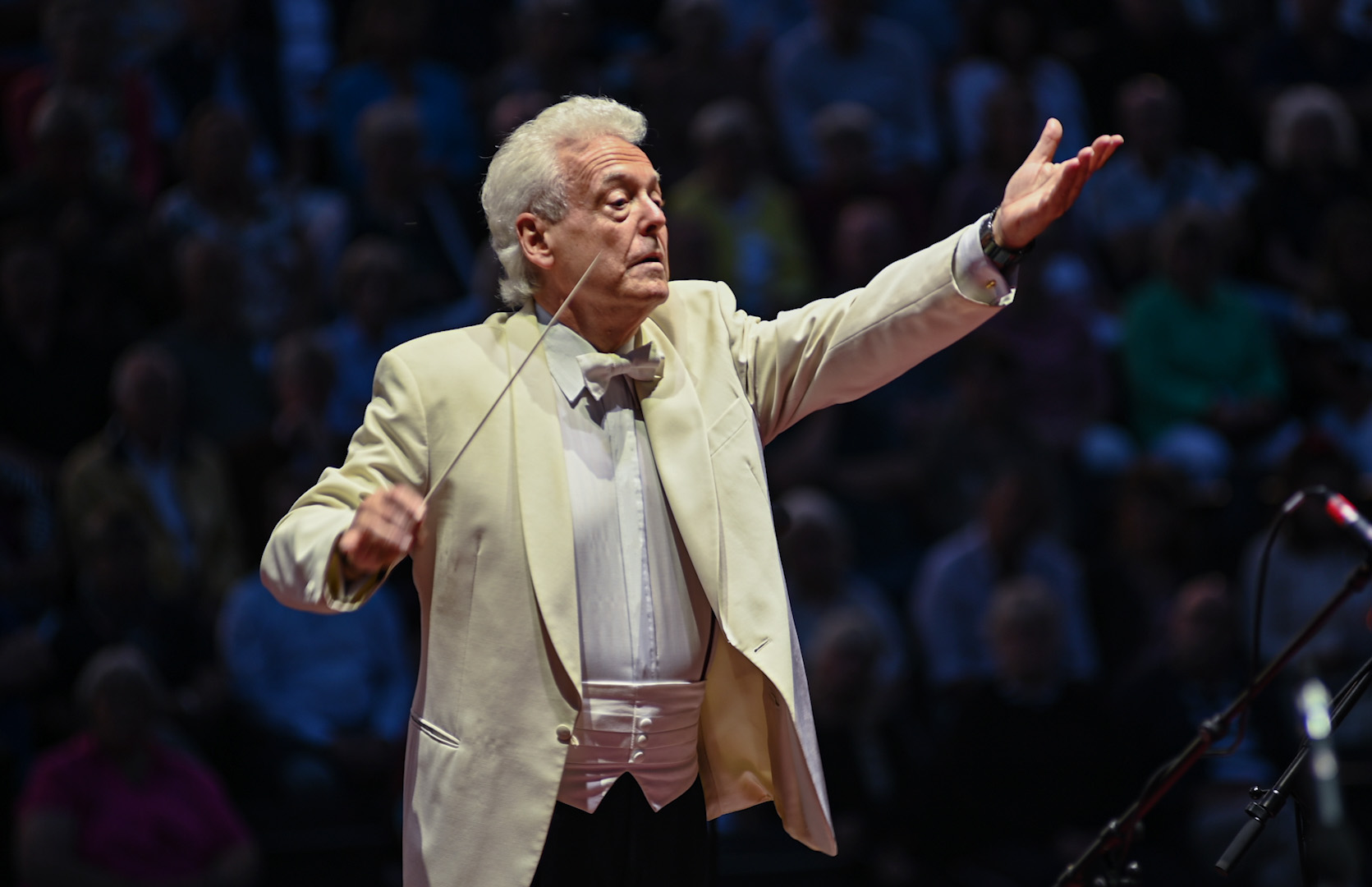
- Griffiths performing at the Eutiner Festspiele in 2024
- Born: Leamington Spa, England
- Occupation: Conductor

Hilary Griffiths is a British conductor based in Germany. He has served as chief conductor of the Theater Oberhausen, the Theater Regensburg, the Eutiner Festspiele, the State Opera Prague, and the Wuppertal Opera.

He has performed world premieres of contemporary operatic works by Salvatore Sciarrino and Thea Musgrave. Hilary Griffiths is notable for his preference to conduct operas entirely from memory, as "it allows one to concentrate better on the orchestra and the stage".

As an opera instructor, Griffiths has taught and conducted student productions at the Hochschule für Musik und darstellende Kunst Mannheim, the University of Music and performing arts Graz (2022), and the University of Georgia (2025).

== Early life and education ==
Hilary Griffiths was born in Leamington Spa, England. He studied mathematics at the University of Oxford and music at the Royal Academy of Music, the London Opera Centre, the Accademia Chigiana in Siena and Conservatorio Giuseppe Verdi in Milan.

== Career ==
His first engagement as a conductor in Germany was at the Cologne Opera, where he later became director of the opera studio. In 1981, he performed the Scottish premiere of Thea Musgrave's The Voice of Ariadne at the Edinburgh International Festival with members of the Cologne opera studio. In 1990, he conducted the world premiere of Jochen Ulrich's ballet production Lulu in Cologne. By 1999, Griffiths had conducted more than 300 performances at the Cologne Opera, and returned in 2019 to perform My Fair Lady.

In 1986, Hilary Griffiths conducted Michael Hampe's Olivier Award winning production of Il matrimonio segreto at the Schwetzingen Festival in Germany, featuring singers Carlos Feller, Georgine Resick, Barbara Daniels, Marta Szirmay, David Kuebler, and Claudio Nicolai. This production was recorded and published on video by EuroArts Music International, BR, and SWR.

From 1993 to 1997, he was general music director of the symphony orchestra and the opera at the Theater Regensburg, conducting productions of Der Rosenkavalier, Otello, Jenufa, Don Giovanni, Intermezzo, Simón Bolívar, Roméo et Juliette, La fanciulla del west, Peter Grimes, Falstaff, Eugen Onegin, and Wozzeck. He also performed symphonic works such as Mahler's 1st Symphony, The Planets (Holst), Turangalîla-Symphonie (Messiaen), and Bruckner's 9th Symphony. In 1995, he conducted the European premiere of Simón Bolivar in Regensburg, and also co-authored the German translation of its libretto.

From 1991 to 2006, Griffiths was chief conductor of the Eutiner Festspiele, performing Die Fledermaus, die Zauberflöte, Fidelio, Il trovatore, Der Freischütz, Zar und Zimmermann, Turandot, Carmen, Der fliegende Holländer, Der Vogelhändler, Die verkaufte Braut, Eine Nacht in Venedig, Madame Butterfly, Der Bettelstudent, Der Zigeunerbaron, Ein Maskenball, Die lustigen Weiber von Windsor, Nabucco, Cavalleria Rusticana, and Pagliacci.

At the State Opera Prague, he has conducted over 200 performances and has prepared 12 new productions since 1992, including Salome, Eine florentinische Tragödie, Der Zwerg, Die Zauberflöte, Erwartung, La bohème (Leoncavallo), Tiefland, I vespri siciliani, Death in Venice, and Tannhäuser. In 1996, Griffiths conducted the State Opera's production of Die Zauberflöte on a tour through 11 cities in Japan. With the Prague State Opera, he has performed La bohème at the "Bartók and Verismo" festival in Miskolc, Hungary in 2006, and Nabucco at the Smetanova Festival in Litomyšl in 2008.

He was chief conductor of the Wuppertal Opera from 2009 to 2012, conducting productions of Fidelio, L'elisir d'amore, Hänsel und Gretel, The Greek Passion, Idomeneo, La Bohème, Arabella, Eine florentinische Tragödie, Das schlaue Füchslein, Gianni Schicchi , Der fliegende Holländer, La porta della legge, and Bluthochzeit. In 2009, Hilary Griffiths conducted the world premiere of Salvatore Sciarrino's La porta delle legge in Wuppertal. This production was later performed at the Lincoln Center Festival in New York City in 2010, and at the Festival iberoamericano de Teatro in Bogotà, Colombia in 2012. In 2013, the Wuppertal production of Bluthochzeit was recorded and published on DVD by Wergo.

Griffiths has been a frequent guest conductor at the Ópera de Colombia in Bogotá, Colombia, performing Madama Butterfly, Le nozze di figaro, Il barbiere di Siviglia, Così fan tutte, Fidelio, and Otello between 2008 and 2017.

== World Premieres ==
- Michael Ende / Gerhard Konzelmann: Das Gauklermärchen - World Premiere: Cologne Opera, 1988
- Nino Rota / Jochen Ulrich: Lulu (Ballet) - World Premiere: Cologne Opera, 1990
- Salvatore Sciarrino: La Porta della legge - World Premiere: Wuppertal Opera, 2009

=== European Premieres ===
- Thea Musgrave: The Voice of Ariadne - Scottish Premiere: Edinburgh International Festival, 1981
- Thea Musgrave: A Christmas Carol - German Premiere: Theater Oberhausen, 1991
- Thea Musgrave: Simón Bolívar - European Premiere: Theater Regensburg, 1995
- Thea Musgrave: Concerto for Clarinet - German Premiere: Theater Regensburg, 1995

=== American Premieres ===
- Salvatore Sciarrino: La Porta della legge - American Premiere: Lincoln Center Festival, New York City, USA, 2010
- Thea Musgrave: Turbulent Landscapes - South American Premiere: Festival iberoamericano de Teatro, Bogotà, 2013

== Discography ==
=== As a conductor ===
- Cimarosa: Il Matrimonio Segreto (1986) - EuroArts Music International, BR, SWR
- Jommelli: Te Deum & Mass in D Major (2000) - Orfeo Music
- Fortner: Bluthochzeit (2013) - Wergo

=== As a pianist ===
- Weber: Klavierwerke zu vier Händen (2001) - Eutiner Festspiele EF2001
