= Mary, Queen of Scots (opera) =

1977 opera by Thea Musgrave

- Opera by Thea Musgrave
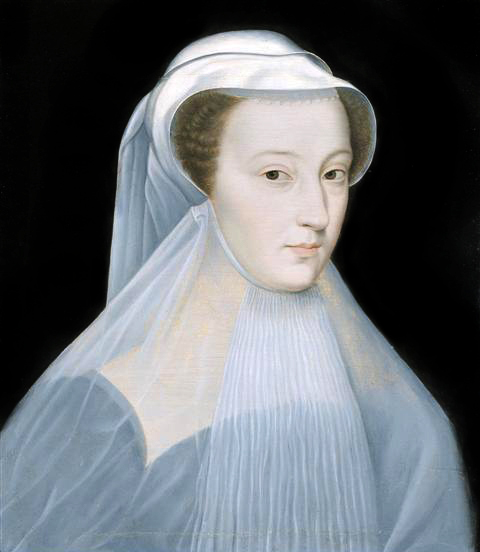
- Mary, Queen of Scots, the opera's protagonist
- Librettist: Thea Musgrave
- Language: English
- Premiere: 6 September 1977; King's Theatre, Edinburgh

Mary, Queen of Scots is an opera in three acts composed by Thea Musgrave. Musgrave also wrote the libretto based on Peruvian writer Amalia Elguera's play Moray. It focuses on events in the life of Mary, Queen of Scots, from her return to Scotland in 1561 until 1568 when she was forced to flee to England. The opera premiered on 6 September 1977 at the King's Theatre in Edinburgh performed by Scottish Opera. It has subsequently had multiple performances in the UK, US, and Germany. A chamber version, produced by Musgrave in 2016, also exists.

== Background ==
Mary, Queen of Scots was the first of four operas on historical figures which Musgrave has composed. The others are Harriet, the Woman Called Moses (1985), Simón Bolívar (1995), and Pontalba (2003). It was also the first for which she wrote her own libretto, a practice which she continued with all her later operas. Musgrave's starting point for the libretto was Moray, an unpublished play by Amalia Elguera who had written the libretto for Musgrave's 1972 opera The Voice of Ariadne. According to Musgrave, she was re-writing the libretto right up to the time she finished composing the music. The opera's primary focus is on Mary's troubled relationships with her half-brother James Stewart, Earl of Moray; her husband Lord Darnley; and her seducer the Earl of Bothwell. These relationships are foreshadowed in her Act 1 aria "The Three Stars of my Firmament". The libretto takes some liberties with the actual historical facts. The character Lord Gordon is fictitious although partly based on Lord Huntly. The real Earl of Moray was murdered two years later than depicted in the opera. Another character in the opera, Cardinal Beaton, was already dead before the opera's action begins in 1561.

== Performance history ==
A commission from Scottish Opera, Mary, Queen of Scots was given its world premiere by the company at the Edinburgh Festival on 6 September 1977. The premiere production was directed by Colin Graham and conducted by Musgrave herself. Over the next two and a half years Scottish Opera took their production on tour to multiple UK cities and gave one performance in Germany at the Staatsoper Stuttgart in May 1978. The US premiere was performed by Virginia Opera on 29 March 1978 in a new production directed by David Farrar and conducted by Peter Mark. Mark was also the conductor at the opera's New York premiere in 1981 when it was performed by New York City Opera.

Other significant later performances have included its first performance in German in a new production at the Städtische Bühnen Oper in Bielefeld (1984) and performances conducted by Musgrave at the Curran Theatre in San Francisco performed by San Francisco Spring Opera (1979). Mary's arias also appear in Musgrave's 40-minute triptych, Three Women: Queen, Mistress, Slave, a narrated assemblage of scenes for the leading female characters from Mary, Queen of Scots and Musgrave's later operas, Simon Bolivar, and Harriet, the Woman Called Moses. The triptych had its world premiere in January 1999 at the Herbst Theatre in San Francisco with Amy Johnson singing all three heroines.

A live recording of Virginia Opera's performance of the US premiere with Ashley Putnam in the title role was released on CD by Novello Records in 1989. The opera made its ENO premiere in London on 15 February 2025, in a co-production with San Francisco Opera.

== Roles ==
Role	Voice type	Premiere cast, 6 September 1977 (Conductor: Thea Musgrave)
Mary, Queen of Scotland	soprano	Catherine Wilson
James Stewart, Earl of Moray, Mary's half-brother	baritone	Jake Gardner
Lord Darnley, Mary's husband from 1565	tenor	David Hillman
Earl of Bothwell	tenor	Gregory Dempsey
David Riccio, Mary's private secretary and advisor	bass	Stafford Dean
Cardinal Beaton	bass	Stafford Dean
Lord Gordon, an enemy of the Earl of Moray and supporter of Mary	bass	William McCue
Earl of Ruthven	tenor	John Robertson
Earl of Morton	bass	Ian Comboy
Mary Seton, Mary's lady-in-waiting	mezzo-soprano	Linda Ormiston
Mary Beaton, Mary's lady-in-waiting	soprano	Eryl Royle
Mary Livingston, Mary's lady-in-waiting	soprano	Una Buchanan
Mary Fleming, Mary's lady-in-waiting	mezzo-soprano	Barbara Barnes
Courtiers, Scottish lords, people of Scotland

== Synopsis ==
Setting: Scotland from 1561 to 1568

Act 1

The opera opens in 1561 with the arrival at the Port of Leith of Mary, the recently widowed Queen of France. The Lords of Scotland have invited her to assume the Scottish crown. Meanwhile, her half-brother James, Earl of Moray is scheming to take the throne himself. Enraged that Cardinal Beaton has exposed his ambitions and written to Mary telling her to place her trust not in James but in the Earl of Bothwell, James has the cardinal imprisoned and killed. A year passes. Scotland is following the Protestant faith but ruled by the Catholic Mary with James as her advisor. At a court ball organized by David Riccio, Mary first encounters her cousin Lord Darnley and is fascinated by him. Although they violently disagree with each other, both James and Bothwell mistrust Darnley's seeming influence on the young queen, especially Bothwell who is likewise attracted to Mary. She soliloquizes on the rivalry between the three men in her life—"The Three Stars of my Firmament". After an incident at the ball which Bothwell seeks to disrupt by insulting Darnley, Mary banishes Bothwell. James also leaves the court in disgust.

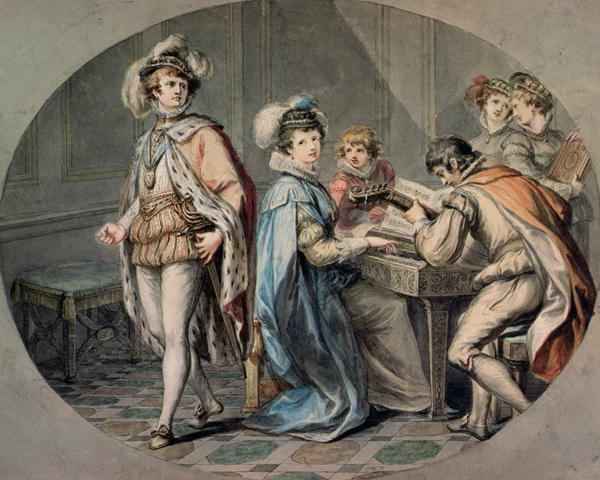
The Jealousy of Darnley by Cipriani

Act 2

It is now 1565 and Mary has married Lord Darnley. Darnley's friend David Riccio has been appointed as the Queen's secretary and has become her friend and advisor. The Lords of the Council strongly criticise the drunken Darnley's suitability as her consort while Mary, now pregnant, feels growing unease at Darnley's pressure for her to name him as her co-sovereign. Mary recalls James to the court to help her deal with the situation and appease the lords. Determined to assume even greater power over Mary, James again earns her mistrust and ultimate estrangement, made worse when she discovers that he was behind the murder of Cardinal Beaton. She decides that henceforth she will rely on her own strength, free of Darnley, Bothwell, and James—"Alone, Alone, I stand Alone". James then instigates a plot to goad Darnley into murdering Riccio by convincing him that he is the real father of Mary's child. In Mary's rooms, Riccio and her four ladies-in-waiting entertain her with music. Darnley, bursts into the room and murders Riccio before her eyes. As the council ponders whether to make James the Regent, they hear that Mary has fled the castle and that James is stirring up the Scottish people by accusing Mary of deserting them and conspiring with Darnley to murder Riccio. At one of his harangues, James is challenged by Mary's faithful supporter Lord Gordon. Mary appears in the crowd and accuses James of perfidy, including arranging Riccio's murder to discredit her. The crowd supports her, and she banishes James for life.

Act 3

Exhausted and ill after the birth of her son and with her resolve to "stand alone" now weakening, Mary hears from Lord Gordon that James has raised an army and is turning the people against her. Gordon urges Mary to take refuge in Stirling Castle. She refuses and instead sends for Bothwell asking him to protect her and her infant son, the future king James VI. Gordon is disturbed by this and urges her not to trust Bothwell. Mary and her lady-in-waiting Mary Seton sing a lullaby to Mary's son. When Bothwell eventually returns, he seduces Mary in exchange for his protection. Gordon arrives with the news that Darnley has been murdered and learns that Mary as now been hopelessly compromised by Bothwell's actions. Accompanied by their men, James and Bothwell confront each other. Bothwell is wounded and defeated. By now James has convinced the people of Scotland to demand Mary's abdication in favour of her son. She appeals to the people for support but to no avail. They are now accusing her of having murdered Darnley in addition to everything else. Gordon has sent her infant son to safety and Mary is tricked into fleeing to England alone. Her final soliloquy begins "Alas, alas! Oh dark treacherous night, what calamity awaits me?" As the city gates close behind her, Gordon murders James. Mary's son is proclaimed King of Scotland.
