= Harriet, the Woman Called Moses =

Opera by Thea Musgrave

- Opera by Thea Musgrave
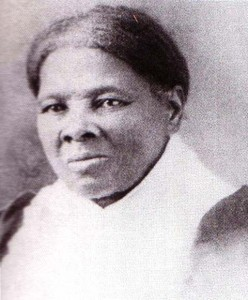
- Harriet Tubman, the opera's protagonist
- Librettist: Thea Musgrave
- Language: English
- Premiere: 1 March 1985; Center Theater, Norfolk, Virginia

Harriet, the Woman Called Moses is an opera in two acts composed by Thea Musgrave who also wrote the libretto which is loosely based on episodes in the life of the American abolitionist and former slave Harriet Tubman. The opera premiered on 1 March 1985 in Norfolk, Virginia, performed by Virginia Opera with subsequent broadcasts of the Virginia Opera production on National Public Radio and BBC Radio 3. Musgrave also wrote two shortened versions of the opera—The Story of Harriet Tubman (written 1990, premiered 1993) and the concert work Remembering Harriet (written 1984, premiered 2006).

== Background ==
Harriet, the Woman Called Moses is loosely based on episodes in the life of Harriet Tubman. Born into slavery in Dorchester County, Maryland, Tubman escaped in 1849. She subsequently returned to Maryland on multiple missions to rescue other enslaved families and friends, using the network of antislavery activists and safe houses known as the Underground Railroad. The abolitionist William Lloyd Garrison named her "Moses", alluding to the Biblical Moses who led the Hebrews to freedom from Egypt.

According to Musgrave, she first had the idea of composing an opera for black singers in 1980 when her husband, Peter Mark, the general director of Virginia Opera, was auditioning singers for a production of Porgy and Bess. She said that she chose Tubman as her subject because "Harriet is every woman who dared to defy injustice and tyranny—she is Joan of Arc, she is Susan B. Anthony, she is Anne Frank, she is Mother Teresa." As with her previous operas Mary, Queen of Scots (1977), A Christmas Carol (1979), and An Occurrence at Owl Creek Bridge (1981), Musgrave also wrote the libretto.

The opera was a joint commission from Virginia Opera and The Royal Opera in London and was written and composed in 1984 while Musgrave was on a Guggenheim Fellowship. She had originally planned the libretto as a straight linear narrative of Tubman's life as a slave and her subsequent rescue missions on the Underground Railroad. However, the opera's director Gordon Davidson later persuaded her to adopt a more free chronological structure, with a series of vignettes that move backward and forward in time and a chorus of slaves which remains on the stage throughout the opera. The chorus acts alternately as an observer and a participant in the stage action.

== Performance history ==
The opera had its world premiere on 1 March 1995 at the Center Theater (now known as the Harrison Opera House) in Norfolk, Virginia. The Virginia Opera orchestra was conducted by Peter Mark with the 22-member chorus drawn from local church choirs. Although Musgrave had originally envisioned period settings, Davidson and the opera's stage designer, Jeffrey Beecroft, eventually opted for a more abstract set with omnipresent "skeletal beams suggesting the ribs of a slave ship". Cynthia Haymon who sang the title role in the premiere had broken her ankle four days before the opening and had to perform on crutches. Her relative immobility and the steeply raked stage set necessitated bringing in the dancer Yvonne Erwin who acted as Harriet's alter ego in some sequences.

Harriet had an initial run of 8 performances in Norfolk, followed by two further performances in Richmond, Virginia. The premiere was recorded and later broadcast in the US on National Public Radio and in the UK on BBC Radio 3 (5 March 1985). Performances of scenes from the opera with piano accompaniment have been given at Garrett's Meetinghouse in Wilmington performed by Opera Delaware (1988), the Skylight Opera Theatre in Milwaukee (1990), and the Southbank Centre in London (2012). Despite having been a co-commission with the Royal Opera House, it has received no performances there.

Musgrave subsequently revised the opera to make its production easier for smaller opera companies. The new version, The Story of Harriet Tubman, was re-orchestrated from a full orchestra to an 8-piece chamber orchestra with the chorus reduced from 22 to 8 members. The libretto was shortened to one act with the running time halved from nearly three hours to one and a half hours. The number of singing roles was reduced to six, and a narrator was introduced. This version was premiered by Mobile Opera on 15 January 1993. In 2006 Musgrave produced yet another version of the opera titled Remembering Harriet. This version is a structured and narrated series of excerpts from the original opera using the full orchestration and chorus but featuring only the characters of Harriet, Rit, and Josiah. Remembering Harriet was premiered on 13 May 2006 by the Brooklyn Philharmonic and the Total Praise Choir of Emmanuel Baptist Church conducted by Chelsea Tipton II. Cynthia Haymon reprised the role of Harriet. The narrator was Vinson Cole.

Harriet's arias also appear in Musgrave's 40-minute triptych, Three Women: Queen, Mistress, Slave, a narrated assemblage of scenes for the leading female characters from her operas Mary, Queen of Scots, Simon Bolivar, and Harriet, the Woman Called Moses. Three Women had its world premiere in January 1999 at the Herbst Theatre in San Francisco. Apo Hsu conducted the Women's Philharmonic with Amy Johnson singing all three heroines.

== Roles ==
| Role | Voice type | Premiere cast, 1 March 1985 (Conductor: Peter Mark) |
|---|---|---|
| Harriet (Harriet Tubman) | soprano | Cynthia Haymon |
| Rit, Harriet's mother | mezzo-soprano | Alteouise De Vaughn |
| Benji, Harriet's brother | tenor | Damon Evans |
| Josiah, Harriet's fiancé | baritone | Ben Holt |
| Mr. Garrett (the abolitionist Thomas Garrett) | baritone | Peter Van Derick |
| Preston, a slave owner | tenor | Barry Craft |
| Old Master, Preston's father | bass | Jay Willoughby |
| Ben, Harriet's father | bass | Raymond Bazemore |
| Mr. McLeod, the plantation overseer | tenor | Michael Muziko |
| Edward Covey, leader of the slave patrol | bass | Anthony Zbrzezny |
Chorus of Harriet's siblings, field hand slaves, house slaves, and freed slaves

The opera also has several spoken roles: Cato (a teenage slave), Sue Ellen (Preston's wife), two bounty hunters, the jail keeper, and a police sergeant.

== Synopsis ==
Setting: Delaware, Maryland, and the Canadian border in the 1850s

Act 1

Escaped slave Harriet is now being sheltered in the house of Thomas Garrett in Delaware. In a dream she hears the slaves who were left behind in Maryland calling, "Moses! Moses! Lead us out of bondage!" She is transported back in time and relives the experiences on the plantation which led to her escape, including the attempt by Preston, the plantation owner's son, to seduce her, and her love for fellow slave Josiah. When she awakens, she vows to return to the South and help free her people.

Act 2

As the act opens Harriet is now an experienced conductor on the Underground Railroad and has led numerous slaves to freedom. In Maryland she is suspected of being the man named "Moses" who had helped so many slaves escape to the North. Despite Garret's warning of the danger she now faces and the pleas of Josiah with whom she has been reunited, she vows to return for a last mission to rescue her parents and siblings. After many vicissitudes Harriet, her family, and Josiah escape to the North and then make their way to Canada pursued by Preston. As they are about to cross the bridge into Canada, Preston attempts to shoot Harriet. The bullet misses her and hits Josiah who dies in her arms.
