= An Occurrence at Owl Creek Bridge (opera) =

1982 radio opera by Thea Musgrave

- Radio opera by Thea Musgrave
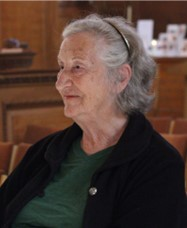
- Thea Musgrave (2017)
- Librettist: Musgrave
- Language: English
- Based on: "An Occurrence at Owl Creek Bridge" by Ambrose Bierce (1890)
- Premiere: 14 September 1982; BBC Radio 3, London

An Occurrence at Owl Creek Bridge is a one-act radio opera by Scottish composer Thea Musgrave. Musgrave also wrote the libretto, based on the 1890 short story of the same name by American writer Ambrose Bierce. The opera, commissioned by the BBC, premiered on BBC Radio 3 in 1982. The first staged performance was in 1988.

Musgrave, who has lived in the United States since 1972, said that she would not have been able to write the opera without having lived in the Southern United States and becoming familiar with its dialects. Musgrave dedicated the opera to her husband, violist and conductor Peter Mark, who was artistic director of the Virginia Opera for thirty-five years.

== Synopsis ==
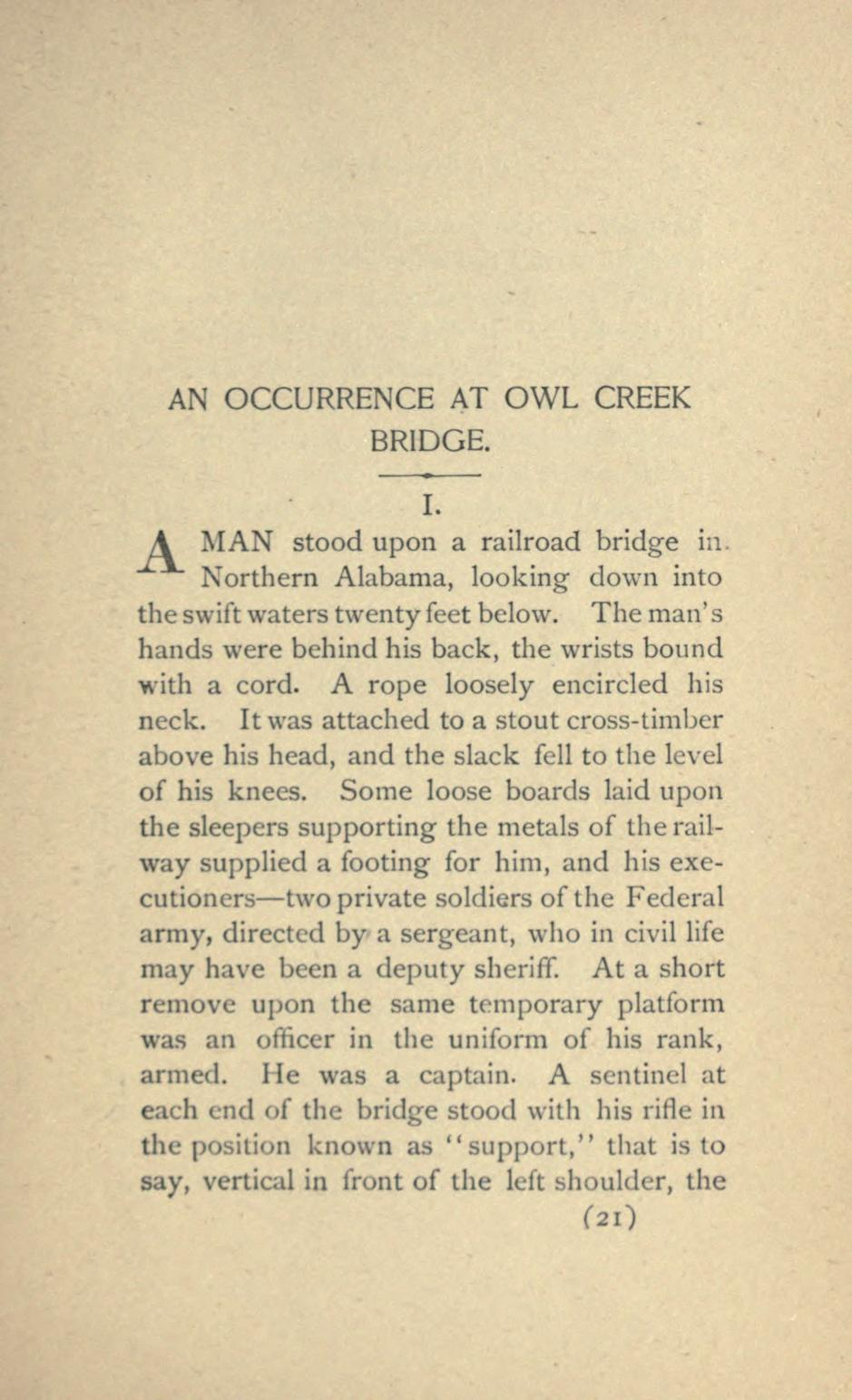
First page of Ambrose Bierce's short story as published in Tales of Soldiers and Civilians (1891)

Peyton Farquhar (baritone) is a Southern plantation owner in Alabama, then part of the Confederate States of America, during the American Civil War. Farquhar is to be hanged from the Owl Creek railroad bridge in northern Alabama by the Union army for trying to burn it down. As he is dropped from the bridge, the rope breaks; he escapes and returns home. However, the escape is ultimately revealed as a fantasy of Farquhar's dying moments.

Farquhar is the only singing part; the narrator speaks rather than sings.

== Performances ==
Musgrave conducted the London Sinfonietta in the premiere on BBC Radio 3. The broadcast, on 14 September 1982, featured Jake Gardner as Farquhar and Gayle Hunnicutt as the narrator. (Gardner had created the role of James Stewart in the original production of Musgrave's Mary, Queen of Scots in 1977.) David Healy and Ed Bishop also had speaking parts. The original production included a pre-recorded track of nature sounds. The broadcast was released on compact disc by NMC Recordings in 2011.

The first staged production was on 23 June 1988 at South Hill Park in Bracknell, Berkshire, England, during the Wilde Festival of Music. The opera was presented on a double bill with William Walton's The Bear. George Badacsonyi conducted the production by his Thameside Opera and Dominic Barber directed. Brian Rayner Cook played Farquhar and Sarah Connolly was his wife. The recorded nature sounds were omitted from this production. The same year, the Cheltenham Music Festival also presented Thameside Opera's production with Cook.

The American premiere in an unstaged performance was on 18 January 1986 by the University of Cincinnati – College-Conservatory of Music Wind Symphony. The first staged American performance was on 1 December 2001 in New York City, presented by Operaworks.

== Reception ==
The New Grove Dictionary of Opera deemed Occurrence "a true radio opera, evolving its own narrative modes and taking imaginative account of the limitations and potentialities of the medium." Brian Morton said of the staged production that "Musgrave's scoring for baritone, speakers, tape, and orchestra is as daring a use for voice in Britain this century and the equal of anything done by Benjamin Britten." MusicWeb International's review said that "the sung passages of this remarkable work achieve real lyricism, expressiveness and a most moving intensity," and that Gardner in the lead role was "transformed, both by the music and by his own remarkable talent, into an eloquent, passionate man whose character we can believe in and whose story moves and inspires us."

In contrast, Philip Clark of Gramophone likened it to "a 12-tone revival of Bonanza being interpreted by the cast and crew of The Archers" and wrote that "much of Musgrave's music is 'incidental' in the worst possible sense: chords have no function other than as scene-setting prompts; dialogue is underpinned with pointless ostinatos. And that no one shows much awareness of how ridiculous the caricatured American accents sound, or what a twee and hollow response this is to Bierce's text, is unforgivable."

== Roles ==
Roles, voice types, BBC premiere, Wilde Festival
Role	Voice type	BBC premiere, 1982 Conductor: Thea Musgrave	Wilde Festival, 1988 Conductor: George Badacsonyi
Peyton Farquhar	baritone	Jake Gardner	Brian Rayner Cook
Narrator (Farquhar's wife)	spoken	Gayle Hunnicutt	Sarah Connolly

== See also ==
- Christopher Whelen, who wrote the opera Incident at Owl Creek, based on the same source material.
