= Versailles, Louisiana =

Versailles
- Unincorporated community
- Location of Versailles in Louisiana
- Coordinates: 29°56′54″N 89°57′39″W
- Country: United States
- State: Louisiana
- Parish: St. Bernard Parish
- Time zone: UTC-6 (CST)
  - Summer (DST): UTC-5 (CDT)

Versailles is an unincorporated community in St. Bernard Parish, Louisiana, United States. It is located along the East Bank of the Mississippi River, approximately 3.5 miles below the lower limit of New Orleans. The community, for governmental and postal address purposes, is considered part of Chalmette and by some designations, part of neighboring Meraux. As a place designation, the name "Versailles" continues in local use.

== History ==
Versailles was founded by Major-General Pierre Denis de la Ronde (1762–1824), one of Louisiana's wealthiest plantation owners and a descendant of French Canadian judge and poet, René-Louis Chartier de Lotbinière, of Maison Lotbinière, poet Alain Chartier and, traditionally, the explorer Jehan Denys, though this is unproven and is likely entirely the confabulation of Frederick Gilman Forsyth, the self-styled, so-called "Forsyth de Fronsac," who published falsified lineages.

In 1802, Denis de La Ronde was appointed to Louisiana (New Spain)'s governing authority, the Cabildo, at the behest of his late brother-in-law, Andrés Almonaster y Rojas, to succeed him as Regidor Perpetuo, Councilman for Life. (Spanish bureaucratic offices were a form of property, purchased from the Crown, and could be inherited.) In 1805, during the U.S. territorial period, along with other local investors, he made plans to build Versailles along the Mississippi River and to then cut a barge canal through some dozen miles of swamp to the shore of Lake Pontchartrain, where they planned to build another town, to be called "Paris." The intended communities were named after Paris and Versailles in France and were meant to recreate the French style. Denis de La Ronde envisioned that this Versailles would overtake New Orleans in size and popularity.

However, development was waylaid by political unrest, culminating in the War of 1812. In 1814–15, then-Colonel de La Ronde commanded the Louisiana militia's Third Regiment at the Battle of New Orleans, which was fought both at his plantation (December 23, 1814, Night Battle) and at the neighboring Chalmette plantation, belonging to his maternal half-brother, Ignace Martin de Lino de Chalmette (1755–1815).

Like de La Ronde, de Lino was a descendant of the Chartier family, through his paternal grandmother. Their mutual niece, Micaela Almonester, Baroness de Pontalba, later constructed the Pontalba Buildings in New Orleans, during the 1840s, then, in 1855, completed the Hôtel de Pontalba in Paris. All three are descendants of the famed French architect Ignace François Broutin.

Versailles remained a small town for the rest of the 19th century, with no navigable canal linking the River and the Lake until the Industrial Canal was built in New Orleans during the 20th century. Denis de La Ronde's path through the swamps fared better, eventually developing into a major artery. Paris Road remains the farthest downriver route connecting the River to the Lake in Greater New Orleans.

In 1903, executives of the St. Louis–San Francisco Railway (known more commonly as the "Frisco Railroad") engaged in negotiations to purchase large tracts of land in St. Bernard Parish "up to the Orleans Parish line" as part of their plans of "gigantic scope" to further the expansion of the company's rail lines and operations facilities across Louisiana. As part of this plan, they proposed relocating the residents of the nearby village of Fazendeville, a historically Black community, to Versailles, which was described in one newspaper report as a "settlement consist[ing] merely of a row of very small properties along a public road running at right angles from the river to the railroad track." Although some Fazendeville residents agreed to the relocation, many refused the railway's financial offers.

== La Ronde Plantation ==
The house was considered the most stylish plantation home in that part of Louisiana at the time, and the name Versailles is mistakenly distributed by various authors and in reports—largely from the misnaming of the La Ronde plantation in Old Families of Louisiana. Evidence has yet to materialize, however, that this mansion was ever referred to as "Versailles" in its time, or by its owners. The plantation was affectionately known as "Parnassus" to the family, a home "where lavish hospitality was dispensed."

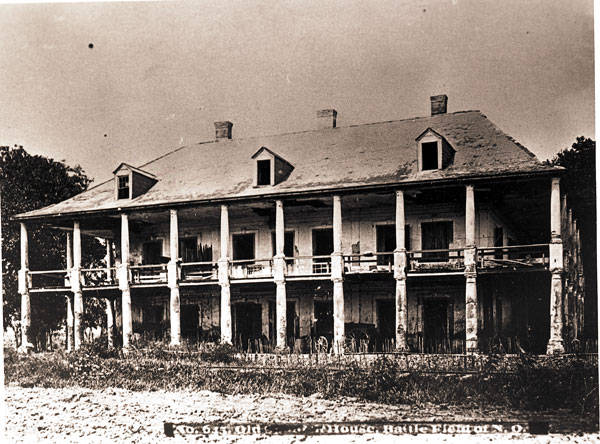
Denis de la Ronde House c.1866

Pierre Denis de La Ronde purchased the property in 1783. Then, to commemorate his 21st birthday, he had slaves plant an avenue of now-famous oak trees. The allée still stands, largely intact, as the La Ronde Oaks—though the trees, like the mansion they once led to from the Mississippi, are also widely mislabeled as "Versailles Oaks" or "Pakenham's Oaks" (the latter since General Edward Pakenham met his fatal end from battlefield injuries among Denis de La Ronde's oaks).

On December 23, 1814, General Andrew Jackson learned of the advances and position of the British encampment from Colonel Pierre Denys de La Ronde and his son-in-law, Major Gabriel Villeré. The Night Attack of the Battle of New Orleans was subsequently fought on the La Ronde plantation. Major Villeré was the son of Louisiana's future first Creole Governor, Jacques Villeré.

The La Ronde mansion was looted and heavily damaged by the British during the fateful Night Attack of December 23, 1814, which effectively launched the Battle of New Orleans, then further ruined when commandeered by the British as a field hospital. The house then burned about 70 years later, though most of the walls remained standing until the hurricane of 1915. A few ruins remain visible along Highway 46 in St. Bernard Parish, as does the southern live oak allée that once graced the path from the Mississippi River landing to the manor house.

== Sources ==
- Arthur, Stanley Clisby (1915), The story of the Battle of New Orleans, New Orleans: Louisiana Historical Society, OCLC 493033588
- Fraiser, Jim (2003), The French Quarter of New Orleans, Jackson, Miss.: University Press of Mississippi, OCLC 869070660
