= Andres Almonaster y Rojas =

Spanish politician and philanthropist

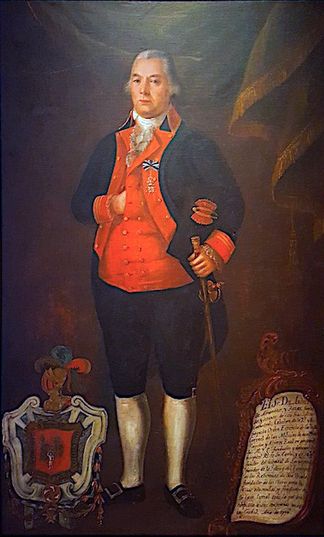
Almonester, formal portrait with trappings of office, c. 1796

Don Andrés Almonaster y Roxas de Estrada (June 19, 1724 in Mairena del Alcor, Spain – April 26, 1798 in New Orleans, Luisiana) was a Spanish civil servant and philanthropist of New Orleans, today chiefly remembered for his numerous charitable benefactions made to the city of New Orleans.

== Biography ==
Born of a noble Andalusian family, as the son of Don Miguel José de Almonester and Maria Juana Roxas de Estrada, Almonester married, first, Maria Paula Rita del Rosario Martinez, in 1748, Paula died shortly after delivering their first child, who had not survived birth.

Almonester arrived to Louisiana in 1769, during its early days of Spanish rule, appointed escribano publico or notary public, which Grace King described as "an office rich in salary, perquisites, and business opportunities. He soon acquired wealth in it, or through it." Among his investments was a large tract of land downtown, purchased from Governor O'Reilly on perpetual lease. Once in New Orleans, Andres Almonaster obtained the position of notary under the orders of the governor Luis de Unzaga. After the fire of April 1771, then Almonaster with the positions of secretary, accountant and recorder of Governor Unzaga, would both have to re-plan part of this city urbanistically and constructing the main buildings of what will be the capital of Louisiana. Almonester became an alcalde or city councilman for Louisiana (New Spain)'s governing authority, the Cabildo, and afterwards bought the office of Alferez Real or royal standard bearer. He was made Knight of the Royal and Distinguished Spanish Order of Carlos III in 1796.

His nearest allies appear to have been Governor Esteban Rodríguez Miró, Père Antoine (Antonio de Sedella), and the de La Ronde family, to which he later joined through marriage.

== Marriage ==
Approaching his 60th birthday, Almonester wed Marie-Louise Denis de La Ronde (1758 - 1825), a renowned Creole beauty, fully half his age, in the parish church, Iglesia San Luis, in 1787 — the year before it was destroyed by fire. In the author's introduction to their daughter's Pulitzer Prize-nominated biography, Intimate Enemies, Christina Vella describes Louise as "a poor French Creole, famed for marrying her father," yet while noting the status quo in Chapter One: "The French and Spanish oligarchs of the colony... dividing the lucrative offices among themselves and circulating their wealth within careful limits by intermarriage." Family fortunes declined with the death of her father, Hardly a pauper; Louise, in fact, was the eldest child of an ennobled family of no little import whose marriage had been arranged to formalize alliances between Don Almonester and an aristocratic family transitioning from France to Nouvelle-France to French Louisiana, and then to Spanish Louisiana.

Louise was the well-connected eldest child of French-Canadian Naval Officer Pierre Denys de La Ronde (1726-1772), who had been reassigned from Nouvelle-France to Nouvelle-Orleans by his godfather, future French Louisiana Governor, Pierre de Rigaud, Marquis de Vaudreuil-Cavagnial, and was distinguished in the French and Indian Wars. Through her father, Louise was the great-granddaughter of Judge and celebrated French poet René-Louis Chartier de Lotbinière of Maison Lotbinière; great-great niece of Simon-Pierre Denys de Bonaventure; and a great-niece, through his wife, Charlotte Denys de La Ronde, of Claude de Ramezay, Governor of Trois-Rivières, then of Montreal. Louise's only brother, Pierre Denis de La Ronde (1762 - 1824), was, like his predecessor, enabled to wealth when he succeeded Almonester on the Cabildo, becoming the wealthiest of Louisiana plantation owners. He would later distinguish himself in the Battle of New Orleans, and is now remembered for his since misnamed Versailles, Louisiana plantation's legacy: a magnificent allée of southern live oaks, still leading from the Mississippi River to the ruins of his former mansion.

Through her mother, Louise was also the granddaughter of a powerful military officer best remembered for his years as Louisiana's esteemed royal architect and engineer, Ignace François Broutin. Louise's mother's sister, the similarly named Marie-Marguerite Madeleine Broutin, had, most unfortunately, married, in 1754, the Baron Jean-Joseph François Delfau de Pontalba; their son, Joseph-Xavier Delfau de Pontalba would later solicit the Denys family to join his only son, Célestin, in marriage to Louise and Almonester's only daughter, the future Micaela Almonester, Baroness de Pontalba. The unstable Baron would exert himself tormenting young Micaela for her fortune. Decades of misery later– despite many efforts made to separate her from his control –in the wake of her protective mother's demise, he finally attempted to murder Micaela, but succeeded only in taking his own misspent life and thus, with the tragic twist of irony, transferring the title Baroness to the indomitable daughter-in-law whose riches he had so diligently sought for his own. The murderous Baron Pontalba was wed to Louise Marie-Anne Françoise Le Breton des Chapelles, first cousin of the notorious Marie-Delphine de Macarty, better known today as Delphine LaLaurie.

Following the death of Don Almonester, his widow, Louise, became well known as "a superbly competent businesswoman who had greatly increased the inheritance since Almonester's death." (Six years after Almonester's death, Louise then married Jean-Baptiste Victor Castillon. The newlywed couple are reported to have been subjected to a mob's riotous three-day Charivari in response to the youth of the bridegroom who was, contrary to the much younger ages widely reported, a mere seven years her junior, then deemed scandalous.)

== Legacy ==
After the Great New Orleans Fire (1788), Don Almonester funded a public school for the city, as well as a house for the use of the clergy and the charity hospital at the then-considerable cost of $114,000. He rebuilt the buildings on either side of the cathedral, the hospital, the boys' school, a chapel for the Ursulines; and he founded the leper hospital.

Almonester funded the building of New Orleans' parish church, in which he is buried. The Church of Saint Louis was dedicated in 1794, becoming a cathedral the following year, and was never pulled down as some sources may say. In 1849 the cathedral was badly damaged due to the removal of supports which led to the collapse of the center tower. This led to the 1850s remodeled structure as we know it today. Don Andres' remains still lie in the cathedral, entombed in the floor with one of his two daughters, four-year-old Andrea.

New Orleans' Almonaster Avenue is named in his honor, posthumously editing the spelling of his surname from Almonester to Almonaster.
