= Simón Bolívar (opera) =

1995 opera by Thea Musgrave

- Opera by Thea Musgrave
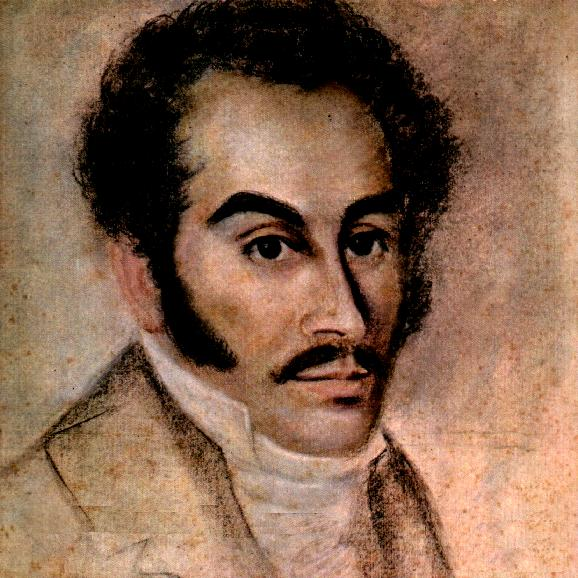
- Simón Bolívar, the opera's protagonist
- Librettist: Thea Musgrave
- Language: English
- Premiere: 20 January 1995; Harrison Opera House, Norfolk, Virginia

Simón Bolívar is an opera in two acts composed by Thea Musgrave who also wrote the libretto. It is loosely based on episodes in the life of Simón Bolívar, the military and political leader who played a leading role in freeing Latin American countries from Spanish rule. The opera premiered on 20 January 1995 performed by Virginia Opera at the Harrison Opera House in Norfolk, Virginia. Although the libretto is written in English, the opera was performed at the premiere in Spanish translation. Musgrave extracted a suite from the opera Remembering Bolívar in 1994 and wrote a shortened version of the opera in 2013.

== Background ==
Musgrave wrote the libretto for Simón Bolívar from 1989 to 1992 and composed the score from 1992 to 1993. It was her eighth opera, and the third to take an historical figure as its protagonist. The previous two were Mary, Queen of Scots (based on the life of Mary, Queen of Scots) and Harriet, the Woman Called Moses (based on the life of Harriet Tubman). According to Musgrave, the idea for the opera began in 1986 after talking with a friend who had just returned from Colombia where Bolívar is revered as a national hero. After reading Emil Ludwig's biography of Bolívar, she became convinced of the operatic potential in his life story. During the summer of 1989, she carried out further research in Mexico City on Bolívar's life and writings as well as Latin American musical styles of the era, some of which are incorporated into the score. The libretto contains some of Bolívar's writings, including "Letter to His People," which he wrote shortly before his death in 1830.

The opera was originally a co-commission from Los Angeles Opera and Scottish Opera. The General Director of Los Angeles Opera at the time, Peter Hemmings, was planning to cast Plácido Domingo as Simón Bolívar and requested a libretto in Spanish for the Los Angeles production. Musgrave, who does not speak Spanish, brought in Lillian Garrett-Groag, a native of Argentina who had directed Virginia Opera's production of Tosca in 1993, to produce the Spanish version. When financial problems at both Los Angeles Opera and Scottish Opera led the companies to cancel the production of Bolívar, Peter Mark, Musgrave's husband and General Director of Virginia Opera, decided to stage the premiere in Virginia. It was the company's biggest project to date. The opera's two acts are divided into 14 scenes spanning a time period from Bolívar's boyhood to 100 years after his death. It is scored for a full orchestra, large chorus and 15 solo singers. The production also involved numerous actors and special effects which included a wind machine, fireworks, and simulated battles.

== Performance history ==
The world premiere of Simón Bolívar on 20 January 1995 at the Harrison Opera House in Norfolk was conducted by Peter Mark. The production, using the Spanish version of the libretto with English surtitles was directed by Lillian Garrett-Groag with sets by John Conklin, costumes by David Murin, and lighting by Mark Stanley. The opera ran for five performances in Norfolk and then moved to Richmond, Virginia for a further two performances. The premiere production was also recorded for later broadcast on National Public Radio and the BBC

In March 1995, Simón Bolívar had its European premiere when it was performed in a new production sung in German at the Theater Regensburg in Germany. Musgrave also devised a concert version of key scenes from the opera under the title Suite from Simón Bolívar (later re-titled Remembering Bolívar). This was performed at the BBC Proms in August 1995 with Peter Mark conducting the BBC Scottish Symphony Orchestra. The three singers were from the original Virginia Opera cast—Amy Johnson as Manuela Sáenz, Stephen Guggenheim as Bolívar, and Douglas Nagel as General Santander.

Manuela Sáenz's arias also appear in Musgrave's 40-minute triptych, Three Women: Queen, Mistress, Slave, a narrated assemblage of scenes for the lead female characters from her operas Mary, Queen of Scots, Simon Bolivar, and Harriet, the Woman Called Moses. Three Women had its world premiere in January 1999 at the Herbst Theatre in San Francisco. Apo Hsu conducted the Women's Philharmonic with Amy Johnson singing all three heroines.

== Roles ==
Role	Voice type	Premiere cast, 20 January 1995 (Conductor: Peter Mark)
Simón Bolívar	tenor	Stephen Guggenheim
Manuela Sáenz, Bolívar's mistress	soprano	Amy Johnson
General Sucre	tenor	Michael Lynn Galanter
General Santander	baritone	Douglas Nagle
General Páez	bass-baritone	Russell Cusick
Rodríguez, Bolívar's tutor / El Sereno, nightwatchman	bass	Richard Lewis
Daniel O'Leary	baritone	Bill Sinclair
Hipólita, young Bolívar's black nanny	soprano	Patricia Saunders Nixon
Pepe Palacios, Hipólita's son and Bolívar's valet	bass	Frank Ward
Pedro, a captain in Bolívar’s army	tenor	Tobin Jones
Pablo, soldier and later aide to Santander	baritone	Randall Gregoire
Young Bolívar	treble	Sean Petersen
Police officer / Santander's aide	bass	David Pratt
Jonatás, Manuela's black servant	?	Tonia Ebanks
Conspirator	bass	Morry Reynolds
Soldiers, crowds, police

== Synopsis ==
Setting: The area of Latin America once known as Gran Colombia in the first half of the 19th century

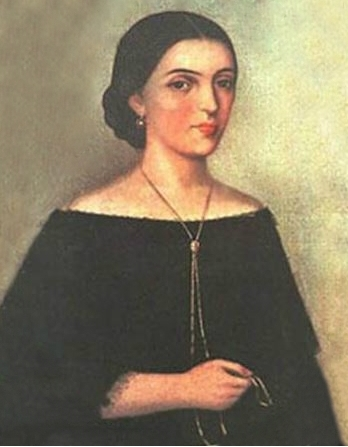
Manuela Sáenz, Bolívar's mistress

Act 1

The opera opens with the sounds of a battle but then flashes back to Bolívar's boyhood with his tutor Rodríguez explaining the concept of the rights of man. The sounds of battle return and bring Bolívar back to the present. A series of six more connected scenes traces the fight for independence from Spain led by Bolívar and the formation of the united republic, Gran Colombia with Bolívar ultimately appointed as its first president and General Santander as its vice-president. Tensions develop with Santander over Bolívar's plan to liberate southern Peru and Venezuela and join them to Gran Colombia. At a ball in the penultimate scene, Bolívar meets Manuela Sáenz and they fall in love. In the act's final scene Bolívar is acclaimed in Peru after the liberation army's victory over the Spanish. The people sing the "Hymn to the Sun" in Quechuan. Downstage, Santander is furious at the turn of events and Manuela has a premonition of Bolívar's death.

Act 2

Two years later, Gran Colombia, the model republic Bolívar had struggled to build has begun to disintegrate. Signs of the debilitating illness which will ultimately kill him begin to appear. His generals Santander and Páez have built up their own power bases and are feuding with him and each other. Manuela saves Bolívar from an assassination attempt but they are eventually driven into exile and although still loved by the common people, he dies in official disgrace. In the final scene 12 years have passed. General O'Leary, Bolívar's faithful aide-de-camp, visits Manuela who is living in poverty in Peru. He tells her that Bolívar's body will finally be returned to Caracas and given a state funeral. With the sound of a crowd praising Bolívar heard in the distance, O'Leary and Manuela recall his life and dreams.

In a coda to the final scene, the action shifts to the 20th century. Crowds in a Latin American country are gathered around a large marble statue of Bolívar and demonstrating against their country's military dictatorship. Police arrive, begin shooting at the crowd and arrest the modern-day Rodríguez who had been distributing anti-government pamphlets. Suddenly the Spirit of Bolívar appears and walks slowly amongst the protestors. Remembering his words from the distant past, they regain their courage and resist the police.
