= Daniel Truhitte =

American actor (born 1943)

- Born: September 10, 1943 (age 83); Sacramento, California, U.S..
- Years active: 1965–present
- Spouses: Gabriele E Hennig (m. 1966, divorced); Mary Michelle Miller (m. 1987, divorced); Tarealia Haney (m. 1992)
- Children: 3, including Thomas Rolf Truhitte

Daniel Truhitte (born September 10, 1943) is an American actor, singer, actor, dancer, and performance teacher best known for his portrayal of Rolf Gruber, the young Austrian telegram delivery boy in The Sound of Music (1965).

== Biography and career ==
Truhitte began dance training at age six and began taking voice lessons at age 10. When he was 15, Truhitte received a scholarship to The Sacramento Ballet. After high school, he received a scholarship to the Pasadena Playhouse. Truhitte also attended Ambassador College in Pasadena, California.

=== The Sound of Music ===
Truhitte was the last person who was cast in The Sound of Music and obtained the role after going through multiple auditions, including audition with choreographers.

After filming The Sound of Music, Truhitte joined the U.S. Marine Corps during the Vietnam War. In 1969, he moved to Weddington, North Carolina, and then finally to Concord, North Carolina, where he began teaching young performers. Truhitte appeared in an episode of Entertainment Tonight titled "A Day in the Life of Dan Truhitte" on September 10, 1993, after The Old Courthouse Theatre of Concord, North Carolina asked him to play Captain von Trapp in their production of The Sound of Music. Truhitte portrayed Captain von Trapp once again in the Hudson, North Carolina Dinner Theatre Production of The Sound of Music in October 2013. He also appeared in gala concert performance of The Sound of Music at New York's Carnegie Hall as Baron Elberfeld, a guest at a party.

== Personal life ==
Truhitte has been married three times. He married his co-star Charmian Carr's understudy, German actress Gabrielle Hennig, in 1966. They dated while filming The Sound of Music and got married two years later. The marriage ended in divorce. Truhitte married Mary Miller in 1987, which also ended in divorce. He later married Tarealia Hanney in 1992.

Truhitte has three sons, one of whom is opera singer Thomas Rolf Truhitte.
