= The Castle Theatre, Wellingborough =

Theatre in Wellingborough, England

Castle Theatre Wellingborough
- Interactive map of Castle Theatre Wellingborough
- Address: 10 Castle Way; Wellingborough, Northamptonshire; England UK
- Coordinates: 52.300°N 0.688°W
- Owner: Borough Council of Wellingborough
- Capacity: 503 (Main House)
- Type: Multi-functional Community Theatre and Arts Centre
- Current use: Received work/produced work/functions venue/conference centre/community centre

Construction
- Opened: 1995
- Years active: 1995 to present

Website
- https://www.parkwoodtheatres.co.uk/castle-theatre

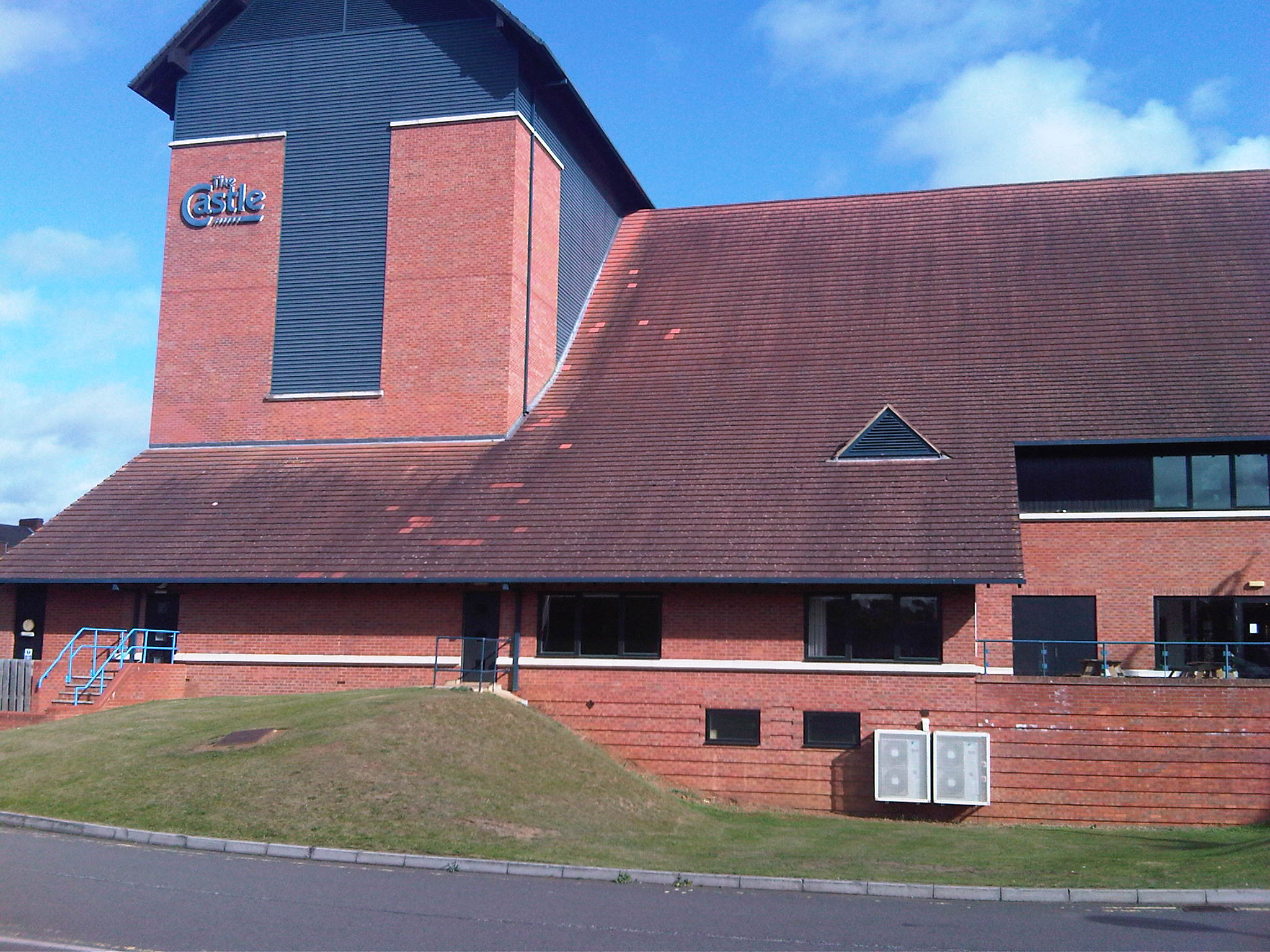
Castle Theatre Wellingborough

Castle Theatre Wellingborough is located in the town of Wellingborough, Northamptonshire, England. The Castle was opened in 1995 as a community resource organisation on the site of Wellingborough's Old Cattle Market.

Facilities include:

- Main House Theatre with 503 seats. Can have variable seating formats
- Main House can be 'flat-floored' for standing concerts with a capacity of up to 700. It can also be in Cabaret format for approx 150
- 84-seat Studio Theatre. 120 in Cabaret format
- Dance studio
- Rehearsal Room used for workshops and meetings
- Art gallery
- Separate exhibition wall

The bar and restaurant facilities are currently operated by Castle Theatre/Parkwood Leisure

Spaces are also available for business meetings and functions, wedding receptions, lectures, conferences, Christmas parties, dinners, talks, workshops, classes, and seminars,

Programming is a balanced mix of professional work, hires, community theatre, film, live satellite streaming from the National Theatre, Royal Opera House and Royal Shakespeare Company, as well as a professional Christmas show.

In June 2016 Castle Theatre Wellingborough was closed, but was re-opened in August 2016. It is currently operated by Parkwood Leisure.

== Artistic directors ==
Former artistic directors.

- 1994-1998 Dominic Barber
- 1999-2001 Daniel Austin (now the Director, joint Executive and Artistic, at Jersey Arts Centre)
- 2001-2004 David Bown (Chief Executive of Harrogate Theatre)
- 2004-2007 Bart Lee
- 2007-2008 Karl Wallace (now Chief Executive and Creative Director National Folk Theatre of Ireland)
- 2009–2011 Nik Ashton

The role of artistic director has now ended at the Castle Theatre after Nik Ashton left the theatre in 2011.
