= Christina Vella =

- Born: March 14, 1942
- Died: March 22, 2017 (aged 75)

Academic background
- Education: Louisiana State University (BA); Tulane University (PhD)
- Thesis: The Baroness Pontalba (1990)
- Doctoral advisor: Radomir Luza
- Other advisor: Lawrence Powell

Academic work
- Discipline: Historian
- Sub-discipline: European history
- Institutions: Tulane University

Christina Vella (March 14, 1942 – March 22, 2017) was an American writer, historian of modern Europe, and adjunct professor at Tulane University in New Orleans.

== Biography ==
Vella received her Ph.D. in European and U.S. history from Tulane University in New Orleans.

Her first book, Intimate Enemies: The Two Worlds of the Baroness de Pontalba, was entered for the Pulitzer Prize and the National Book Award. It was published by Louisiana State University Press in 1997 and was chosen as one of the best books of the year by the New York Times Book Review, Publishers Weekly, and The Times-Picayune. It chronicles the life and career of Micaela Almonester, the woman responsible for building the Embassy of the United States in Paris and the Pontalba Buildings in New Orleans. In 2003, Intimate Enemies was adapted by Thea Musgrave as the opera Pontalba, which premiered in New Orleans in October of that year.

Vella's later books include The Hitler Kiss: A Memoir of the Czech Resistance (2002), co-authored with Radomir Luza, and Indecent Secrets - The Infamous Murri Murder Affair (2006), a history of the Murri murder trial which took place in Bologna, Italy in 1905.

Her biography of George Washington Carver, George Washington Carver: A Life, was published in 2015.

== Awards and honors ==
She received the 2010 Preservation Award from the Foundation for Historical Louisiana.
