= Ignace François Broutin =

French architect

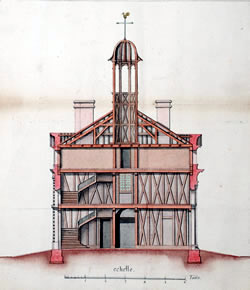
Old Ursuline Convent, New Orleans, 1733

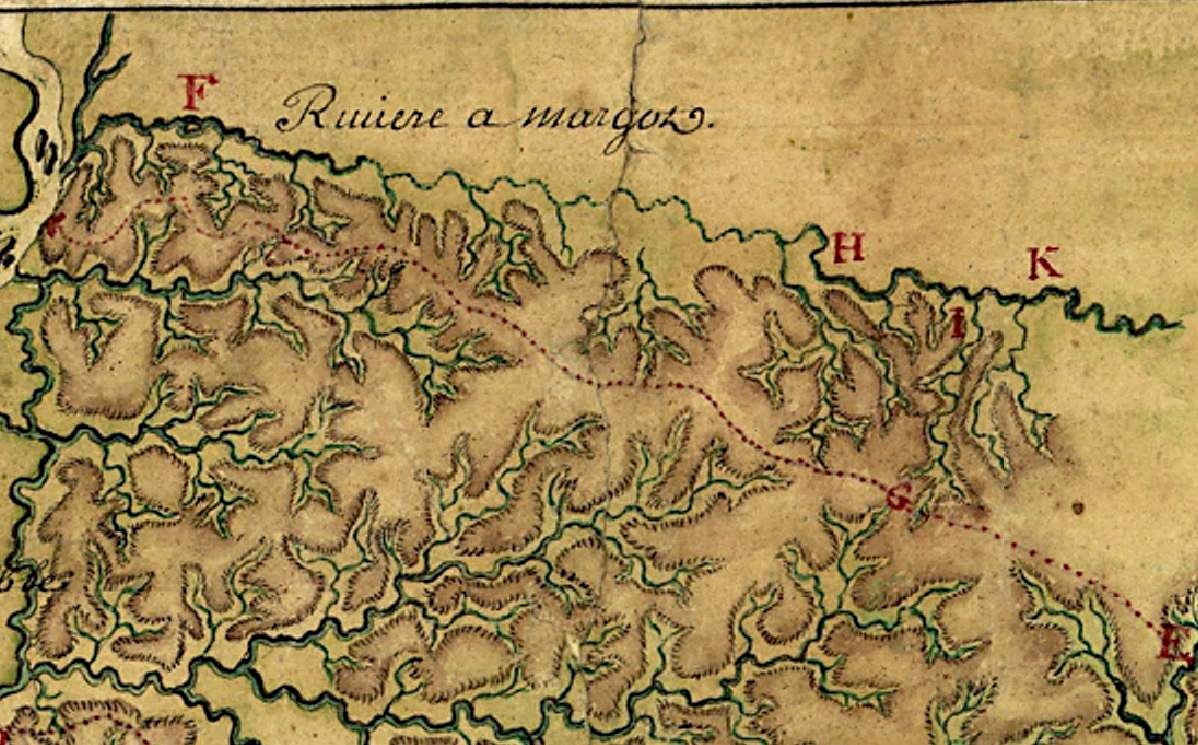
The Wolf River's watershed (everything above the red dotted line), as surveyed in 1740 by Ignace Francois Broutin, chief engineer of French Louisiana. The French had named the Wolf "Riviere a Margot"

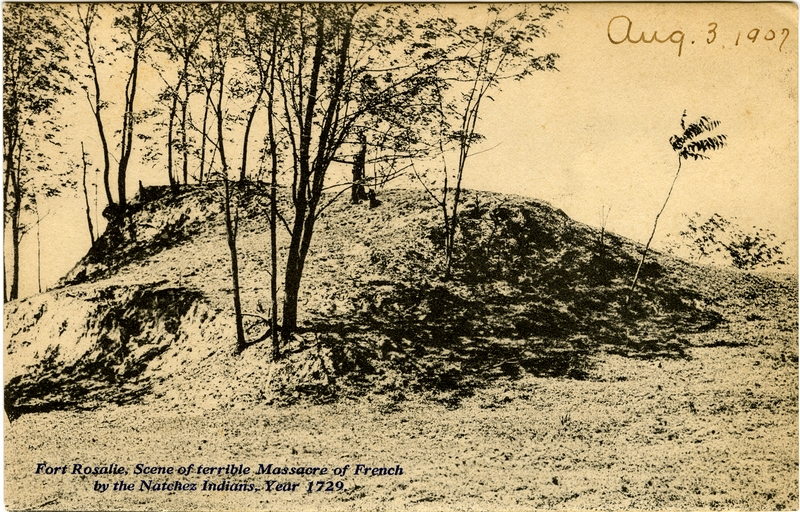
A postcard of the ruins of Fort Rosalie, 1907

Ignace François Broutin (La Bassée, 1690–1751) was a French Chevalier of the Order of St. Louis military officer, commander of Fort Rosalie among the Natchez people, and later an architect and Captain of Engineers of the King in the Province in colonial Louisiana. He is chiefly remembered for designing the Ursuline Convent, completed by 1753 and the oldest and only surviving French colonial building in New Orleans.

A native of La Bassée in northern France, Broutin arrived in Louisiana in 1720 and married Madeleine la Maire (likely a cousin - his mother's maiden name was la Mairée), widow of François Philippe de Marigny and mother of Antoine Philippe de Marigny. In 1748, his daughter, Madeleine Marguerite de Broutin, married a grandson of French-Canadian judge and poet, René-Louis Chartier de Lotbinière, Louis-Xavier Martin de Lino de Chalmette. The de Lino plantation, called "Chalmette", became the site of the 1815 Battle of New Orleans, and was later adopted as the name of the seat of St. Bernard Parish: Chalmette. Their son, Ignace de Lino, reportedly died suddenly, a month later, devastated by the extensive damage to his inherited family mansion during the Battle.

In the year following the 1755 death of her first husband, de Lino, Madeleine Broutin, then 35, wed another grandson of René Chartier's, Major Pierre Denys de La Ronde. Their only son together, Colonel Pierre Denis de La Ronde, played an "essential" role in the Battle of New Orleans, which had also claimed his plantation, bordering the plantation of his half-brother, de Lino. La Ronde's mansion was, first, the main site of the definitive Night Battle, December 23–24, 1814, in which General Edward Pakenham lost his life.

At least two descendants reflected his architectural legacy: grandson Colonel Denis de La Ronde (1762–1824), whose stately "house was similar in plan and exterior to the Ursuline Convent designed by Broutin" (albeit now widely misnamed as Versailles, Louisiana), today an historic ruins; and his niece, the tragic, yet highly creative survivor of the murderous Baron Joseph Delfau de Pontalba's final attempt to steal her fortune. Micaela Almonester, Baroness de Pontalba, whose personal legacy endures, as does her great-grandfather's, with the famed Pontalba Buildings gracing Jackson Square in the French Quarter of New Orleans, Louisiana, and with the official residence of the United States Ambassador to France, the Hôtel de Pontalba in Paris.
