= Micaela Almonester, Baroness de Pontalba =

American businesswoman (1795–1874)

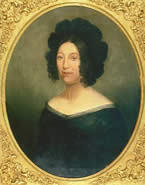
- Portrait of Micaela Almonester, Baroness de Pontalba in the Louisiana State Museum
- Born: Micaela Leonarda Antonia de Almonester Roxas y de la Ronde; November 6, 1795; New Orleans, Louisiana
- Died: 20 April 1874 (aged 78); Paris, France
- Occupations: Businesswoman; Real estate developer Lay architect
- Known for: The design and construction of the Pontalba Buildings in the French Quarter of New Orleans
- Spouse(s): Xavier Célestin Delfau de Pontalba, Baron de Pontalba (m. 1811–1874)
- Children: Joseph Delfau de Pontalba; Célestin Delfau de Pontalba; Alfred Delfau de Pontalba; Gaston Delfau de Pontalba; Mathilde Delfau de Pontalba
- Parent(s): Andrés Almonester y Rojas; Louise Denys de La Ronde

Micaela Leonarda Antonia de Almonester Rojas y de la Ronde, Baroness de Pontalba (November 6, 1795 – April 20, 1874) was a wealthy New Orleans-born Creole aristocrat, businesswoman, and real estate designer and developer, one of the most memorable and dynamic personalities in the city's history, though she lived most of her life in Paris.

On April 26, 1798, when she was just 2 1/2 years old, her father Don Andrés Almonester y Rojas died, leaving her the sole heir to a considerable fortune. In 1811 Micaela married her French cousin, Joseph-Xavier Célestin Delfau de Pontalba, and moved to France. The marriage was not successful and she became a virtual prisoner at the de Pontalba chateau in Mont-l'Évêque, near Senlis, just north of Paris. Her father-in-law, Baron de Pontalba, tried to gain possession of Micaela's inheritance for more than twenty years. In 1834 he shot her four times at point-blank range and then committed suicide. She survived the attack, though mutilated. Her husband succeeded his father as baron, and Micaela was thereafter styled Baroness de Pontalba. She eventually obtained a legal separation from her husband.

Micaela was responsible for the design and construction of the landmark Pontalba Buildings in Jackson Square, in the heart of the French Quarter. In 1855, she had the Hôtel de Pontalba constructed in Paris, and she lived there until her death.

The 2003 opera Pontalba: a Louisiana Legacy, composed by Thea Musgrave, is based on her life. She is also the subject of a play by Diana E.H. Shortes entitled The Baroness Undressed and several novels.

== Biography ==
=== Family background and early years ===
Micaela Leonarda Antonia Almonester was born on November 6, 1795, in New Orleans, Louisiana, then part of New Spain, the first of two daughters born to Don Andres Almonester y Rojas (1724-1798) and his French wife, Louise Denys de la Ronde. (Note: Although Louisiana was then owned by Spain, Spanish settlers were greatly outnumbered by French settlers who had arrived when the area was under French control.) Don Andres, a native of Mairena del Alcor, Andalucia, Spain, was a wealthy notary and politician who amassed a fortune in real estate and land transfers from his power on the Cabildo, the Spanish governing council of New Orleans, and his contacts with the Spanish Crown. On March 29, 1787, he married Louise Denis de la Ronde (1758-1825), who was 30 years his junior and brought no dowry to the marriage. Despite being related to a number of notables, she had been raised by her mother after the death of her father, a naval officer, in 1771, living in streets populated by working class families and laborers. Don Andres bought her a large home several years before marrying her "that she might have an establishment". Her only brother, Pierre Denis de La Ronde (1762-1824), became a wealthy plantation owner through the patronage of his brother-in-law, Don Andres.

When her father died on April 26, 1798, Micaela was just 2 1/2 years old and the sole heir (Note: Her younger sister, Andrea Antonia, had died in 1802 at the age of four.) to a considerable fortune. The estate was capably administered by her mother, who was "a superbly competent businesswoman who had greatly increased the inheritance". As the richest girl in the city, she was educated by the nuns at the old Ursuline Convent on la Rue Conde, now Chartres Street, along with other Creole daughters of the Creole elite. She was an artistic and musical child who, by the age of 13, owned her own piano. At home she spoke French, although she knew Spanish and later learned English.

=== Marriage ===
In keeping with Creole tradition, a marriage was arranged for Micaela in 1811 when she was age fifteen. Although Micaela was in love with an impoverished man, she accepted the husband her mother had chosen for her: her 20-year-old cousin, Joseph-Xavier Célestin Delfau de Pontalba, known as Célestin or "Tin-Tin", who had been born in New Orleans but lived with his family in France. His father, Lt. Col. Joseph Xavier Delfau de Pontalba, a maternal grandson of famed architect Ignace François Broutin, was known in Louisiana as Don José Pontalba, who had been given command of both the German and Acadian coasts in 1791. His mother, Jeanne Louise Marie Anne Françoise Le Breton des Chapelles, had been raised as a daughter by her maternal aunt, Celeste Macarty, wife of the former Spanish Governor Esteban Rodríguez Miró, was a first cousin of the infamous Delphine Macarty LaLaurie, and second cousin to future New Orleans mayor, Augustin de Macarty.

The de Pontalbas proposed the marriage to her mother by letter, considering a matrimonial alliance between the two families as a "business merger that would transfer the Almonester wealth into their hands". Célestin arrived in Louisiana with his mother and after an acquaintance of just three weeks he and Micaela were married on 23 October 1811 at St. Louis Cathedral with the most influential members of Creole society in attendance. Micaela was given away at the wedding ceremony by nobleman and second cousin Bernard de Marigny The ceremony which was conducted in Spanish, a language the groom did not understand. Upon her marriage, Micaela became a French national.

Sometime after the wedding, Micaela and Célestin, accompanied by both their mothers, left Louisiana for France. They arrived in July 1812 and the couple took up residence with Célestin's family at Mont-l'Évêque, the moated, medieval de Pontalba chateau outside Senlis, about 50 miles from Paris. Micaela's mother Louise went to live in a rented house in Paris before she set about astutely buying up property in the city including a home on the Place Vendôme. At first the marriage was successful; Micaela became pregnant shortly after their arrival in France and eventually bore her husband four sons and a daughter. To alleviate the boredom of country life, she converted a large room at the old chateau into a theatre where she put on plays. She put a lot of energy and enthusiasm into her project, ordering costumes for the performers and hiring local people for the minor roles and Parisian artists for the leading roles. She often performed onstage in the amateur theatrical productions which were attended by her friends from Paris.

However, the constant interference of her eccentric father-in-law Baron Joseph Delfau de Pontalba eventually turned the marriage into a disaster, exacerbated by Célestin's weak character. The Baron, who had served as an officer in the French and Spanish armies, was greedy and unstable, and over the years proceeded to make Micaela's life extremely unhappy and intolerable. He had been greatly disappointed with Micaela's dowry, which he thought much smaller than he deemed led to expect. The $40,000 in cash plus jewelry that Micaela brought to Célestin as her dowry, which had been the sum agreed upon when the marriage contract was drawn up, represented one-quarter of her Almonester inheritance; the remaining three-quarters was retained and increased by Louise. The Baron, intent upon taking control of the vast Almonester fortune, had forced Micaela into signing a general power of attorney that granted her husband control over her assets, rents, and capital, including her dowry and as her inheritance from her father. In the early 1820s, to escape the tyranny of her father-in-law, Micaela persuaded Célestin to set up his own household in Paris, and the couple and their children moved into one of his father's homes on Rue du Houssaie, close to her mother's residence.

The 1825 death of her mother left Micaela as the heir and manager of her parents' considerable estates, which now included numerous properties in Paris. The de Pontalbas furiously demanded that she sign over all of her New Orleans property to them, in exchange for being allowed to assume control of her mother's Paris houses. In 1830, without her husband's permission, she went to New Orleans for an extended visit to assert her land rights on American soil. She took this opportunity to visit Canada and tour the United States. She stopped in Washington where President Andrew Jackson sent his carriage and secretary of state Edward Livingston to escort her to the White House as his guest. (Note: The Battle of New Orleans, in which Jackson had defeated the invading British on January 8, 1815, had been fought on the grounds of the Chalmette Plantation, owned by Micaela's uncle Ignace Martin de Lino (1755-1815). Another part of the battle had been fought on the plantation grounds of his half-brother, Micaela's uncle, Colonel Pierre Denys de La Ronde (1762-1824).)

When Micaela returned to France, the Baron accused her of deserting his son, Célestin. She then became a "virtual prisoner" of the de Pontalbas. In frustration, she took her children and returned to Paris, where she initiated a series of lawsuits to obtain a separation from Célestin; these initial attempts were unsuccessful, frustrated by the strict French marriage laws.

=== Shooting attack ===
Micaela's attempts to protect her fortune and separate from Célestin so enraged Baron de Pontalba that he resorted to violence. On October 19, 1834, during one of her visits to the chateau, he stormed into her bedroom and shot Micaela four times in the chest at point-blank range with a pair of duelling pistols. After the first shot, she allegedly screamed out: "Don't! I'll give you everything". Whereupon he replied: "No, you are going to die" and shot her another three times in the chest, one bullet passing through the hand that she had instinctively put up to cover one of the gun's muzzles. Despite her injuries, Micaela made an attempt to escape her father-in-law and outside the door she fell into the arms of her maid who had rushed up the stairs upon hearing the first gunshot. With the armed baron still in pursuit, Micaela was dragged down the stairs to the drawing room where she fell to the floor, crying out, "Help me". Baron de Pontalba stood over her bleeding, unconscious body, yet he fired no more shots and returned to his study.

She survived the shooting attack, despite multiple shot wounds. One of the bullets had crushed her hand; her left breast was disfigured and two of her fingers were mutilated. That evening, the baron committed suicide in his study by shooting himself in the head with the same dueling pistols.

=== Hôtel de Pontalba ===
Upon his father's suicide, Célestin succeeded him as baron and Micaela was thereafter styled Baroness de Pontalba. After several more lawsuits, a civil law judge ordered the restitution of her property and Micaela was granted a legal separation from her husband; they never divorced. With some of the money inherited from her mother, she commissioned noted architect Louis Visconti to construct a mansion on the Rue du Faubourg Saint-Honoré in Paris where she hosted a series of lavish balls and soirées. Her mansion is known today as the Hôtel de Pontalba and serves as the official residence of the United States Ambassador to France.

She was described as a "flamboyant, temperamental redhead", though portraits depict her with brown hair, blue-grey eyes, and pale skin; Christina Vella described her complexion as the "hue of stored muslin". She was not classically beautiful... she was intelligent and strong-willed, and attracted much admiration from the Parisians for her opulent parties. French Quarter historian Sally Reeves adds, "Contemporaries called her persistent, bright-eyed, intelligent, vivacious, prompt, shrewd and business like. Male historians characterized the Baroness as strong-willed, imperious, penurious, self-indulgent and vacillating, while her female biographer uncovered a life of affliction and resilience. Her portrait as a young wife shows a woman of grace and reflection; her photograph at an older age shows a hardened veteran with unmistakably masculine features."

=== The Pontalba Buildings ===
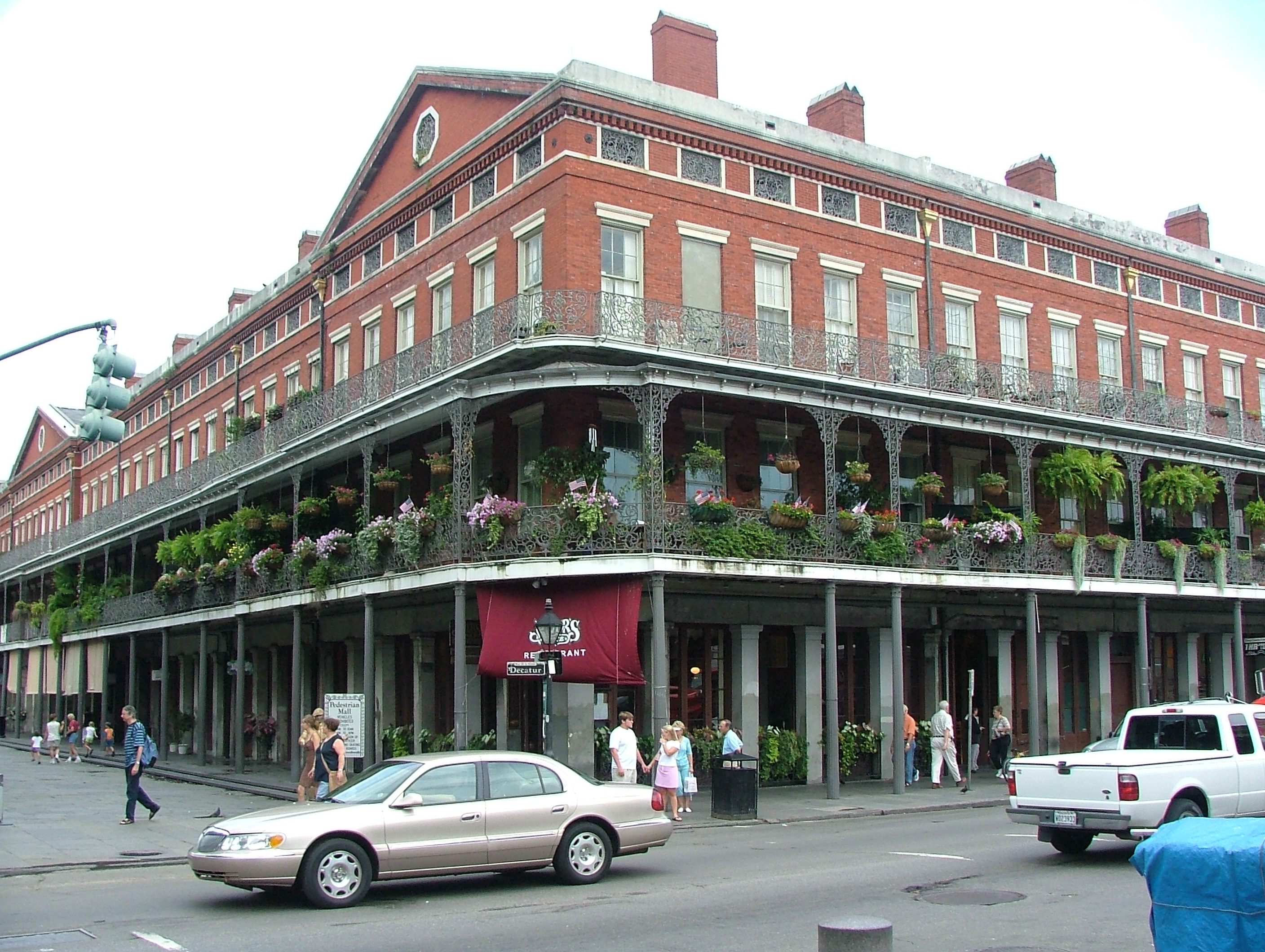
One of the Pontalba Buildings Micaela had constructed in New Orleans' French Quarter

In 1848 at the outbreak of revolution in France, Micaela and two of her sons, Alfred and Gaston, departed for New Orleans. There, she quickly became the leader of fashionable society, her salons drawing the city's most important and influential people. The wealthiest woman in New Orleans at the time, her contemporaries regarded Micaela as having been shrewd, vivacious, and business-like. Seeing New Orleans for the first time after an absence of many years, Micaela had immediately noticed that the once-stylish French Quarter had become derelict and unsightly. The Place d'Armes, in the heart of the French Quarter, was little better than a slum; its parade ground muddy, and houses squalid and neglected. She owned most of the property in Place d'Armes as it formed part of her vast inheritance. Her assets there valued at $520,000, but despite being owner of the third most valuable property in the French Quarter, she made little profit from it as most of her tenants were slack in paying the rent. Micaela put her imagination to work and made energetic plans to remedy the situation. She ordered the houses to be demolished and hired the skilled building contractor Samuel Stewart to renovate the Place d'Armes. The following year after obtaining an agreement from the city for a 20-year tax exemption, she personally designed and commissioned the construction of the beautiful red-brick town houses forming two sides of Place d'Armes which are today known as the Pontalba Buildings. Their exteriors resembled the edifices in Paris' Place des Vosges.

The construction of the Pontalba Buildings cost more than $300,000, and she was a constant visitor to the construction sites, often supervising the work on horseback. The cast-ironwork decorating the balconies were also her personal design and she had her initials "AP" carved into the center of each section. Micaela knew so much about the design and construction of buildings that historian Christina Vella described her as a "lay genius in architecture".

At the time the buildings were row houses. Micaela and her sons occupied the house at number 5, St. Peter Street. When Swedish singer Jenny Lind visited New Orleans for a month in 1851, Micaela graciously allowed her the use of her own house along with a chef. Prior to her departure, Lind publicly expressed her gratitude to Micaela for the latter's lavish hospitality. Afterward, Micaela auctioned the furniture Lind had used. Micaela was also instrumental in the name change of Place d'Armes to Jackson Square; as well as the decision to convert it from a parade ground to a formal garden. She also helped finance the bronze equestrian statue of Andrew Jackson, featured prominently in the square, at whose side her uncle, Colonel Pierre Denys de La Ronde (1762 - 1824), had fought during the Battle of New Orleans, playing crucial roles in advising Jackson, and in rallying local support. It was alleged that when she was landscaping the garden, she threatened the mayor with a shotgun after he tried to prevent her from tearing down two rows of trees.

Shortly after Jenny Lind's visit, she and her sons left New Orleans for good and went back to Paris where her eldest surviving son, Célestin, and his family resided. She spent the remainder of her life at her mansion on the Rue du Faubourg Saint-Honoré. When her estranged husband suffered a physical and mental breakdown she took him in and cared for him up until her own death.

=== Death and legacy ===
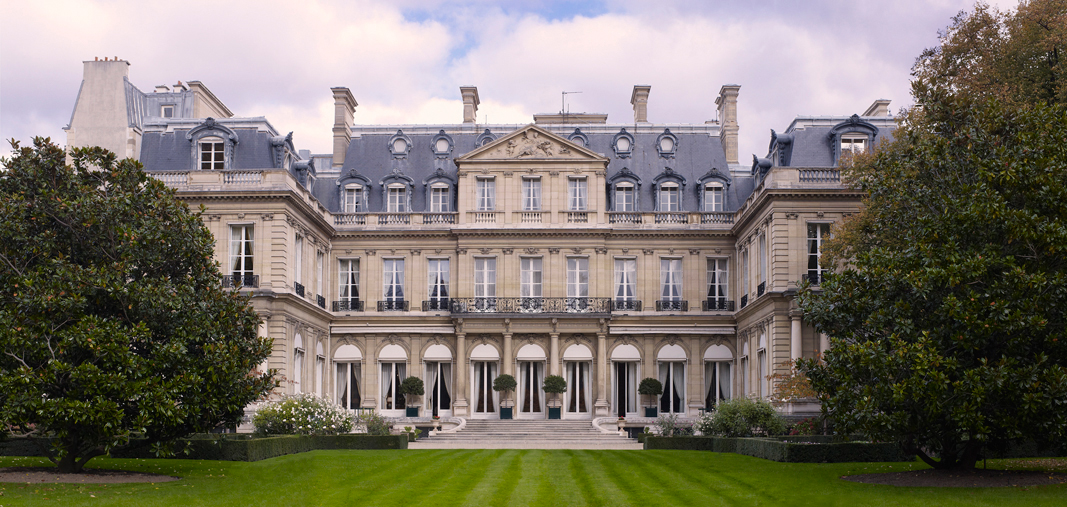
Hôtel de Pontalba, Micaela's Paris mansion where she died in 1874

Micaela Almonester de Pontalba died at the Hôtel de Pontalba on April 20, 1874, at the age of 78. By this time she was already a legend in the city, recognized as one of New Orleans' most dynamic personalities.

She left three sons: Célestin (1815-1885), Alfred (1818-1877), and Gaston (1821-1875). Her first-born son, Joseph, and only daughter, Mathilde, had died as babies. Célestin and Alfred both married and had children whose descendants continued to reside in France into the 21st century. Gaston died unmarried. Micaela's husband Célestin died on 18 August 1878. He was buried beside her in the de Pontalba family tomb at Mont l'Évêque.

Micaela is the subject of Thea Musgrave's 2003 opera, Pontalba which is based on Christina Vella's biography of Micaela, Intimate Enemies: The Two Worlds of the Baroness Pontalba. A play by Diana E.H. Shortes, entitled The Baroness Undressed, and many novels have been written about her dramatic life.

== Ancestry ==
Ancestors of Micaela Almonester, Baroness de Pontalba

Don Miguel Jose Almonester
Andres Almonester y Rojas
Maria Joanna de Estrada y Rojas
Micaela Leonarda Antonia Almonester
Pierre Denis
Louis Denis, Sieur de la Ronde
Catherine Le Neuf de la Poterie
Pierre Denis de la Ronde
René-Louis Chartier de Lotbinière
Louise Chartier de Lotbinière
Marie Madeiene Lambert du Mont
Marie Louise Denis de la Ronde
Pierre De Broutin
Ignace Francois Broutin
Michelle LeMaire
Marie Madeleine Broutin
Pierre LeMaire
Marie Madeleine LeMaire
Marguerite la Motte
