= Barbara Dever =

American mezzo-soprano opera singer

Barbara Dever (born December 25, 1951) is an American mezzo-soprano opera singer who has appeared with Luciano Pavarotti, Plácido Domingo, Zubin Mehta, Nello Santi and James Levine.

Dever grew up in Pitman, New Jersey.

Dever made her Metropolitan Opera debut in 1994, as Amneris in Aida. Other roles at the Met include Azucena in Il Trovatore, Ulrica in Un Ballo in Maschera, Eboli in Don Carlo, and Fricka in Die Walküre (1993 Japan tour under James Levine).

She has sung at the Washington Opera, New National Theater (Tokyo), Michigan Opera Theatre, Teatro Lirico di Cagliari, Teatro Massimo (Palermo; Grand Reopening), La Scala, Vienna State Opera, Berlin State Opera, Teatro Colón, Arena di Verona, Virginia Opera, and the Cincinnati Opera.

Dever's performances have taken her to Montreal, Mexico City, Macerata, Parma, Reykjavík, San Diego, Antwerp, Puerto Rico, Palermo, Vancouver, Santiago, Berlin, and Buenos Aires.

She has performed with the State Symphony Orchestra of São Paulo, the Louisville Orchestra at Chautauqua, the Florida Philharmonic, the Israel Philharmonic Orchestra, the Pacific Symphony, the Netherlands Radio Orchestra and the National Orchestra of Mexico.

Dever sang at a Lincoln Center live concert telecast with Pavarotti and performed the role of Dalila opposite Plácido Domingo's Samson in 1998 (Mexico City).

In 2009, Dever was recognized by Rowan University with an honorary doctorate in music, joining five others in the school's history to be so honored for music.
