= Dominic Barber =

English theatre director (1955–2003)

- Born: Dominic Anthony Barber; 21 July 1955; Bristol, Gloucestershire, England, UK
- Died: 9 May 2003 (aged 47); Bristol, Gloucestershire, England, UK
- Occupation: Theatre director
- Years active: 1980s–1990s

Dominic Anthony Barber (21 July 1955 – 9 May 2003) was an English theatre director.

== Biography ==
Barber trained at Dartington College of Arts. In 1979, aged 24 and early in his career, he became an outspoken advocate of arts council funding and theatre in education. He became assistant director to Ian Emmerson at the Maddermarket Theatre, Norwich and in 1983 moved to the Wyvern Theatre, Swindon as Community Drama Director. In 1985, he was appointed Resident Theatre Director at South Hill Park Arts Centre in Bracknell. During this time he became a trustee of The Ark, a creative centre for students with learning difficulties, for whom he took weekly drama workshops. He also worked as a Drama Tutor at Broadmoor Hospital and took weekly acting workshops with the patients there. An interview given with Rob Ferris in 1992 about his work in Broadmoor is indicative of Barber's broader directorial approach. He says –

It's not dramatherapy, though it has a therapeutic quality to it, in as much as they are free to get things wrong and are free to explore crazy situations, usually comic. I feel that laughter in itself is a therapy. [...] There are no rules and regulations. I encourage them to improvise, try things out, and enjoy it. [...] I realised more and more how important the element of fun is – it's a sort of playground of creative ideas – they can play and they are allowed to play [...] They ask me how do I do this and I say well I am not going to tell you how you do this, try it, and if you get it hopelessly wrong then I'll help you but I am not going to prescribe. I am not going to tell you this is how you act. It's got to come from you.

In 1994, Barber left South Hill Park to become artistic director of The Castle Theatre, Wellingborough, which he opened in 1995 with a production of 'Annie'. At this point he was recognised as being representative of

a new generation of arts directors, trained in the seventies and eighties rather than the sixties, running new venues in a distinctive style, based on direction rather than administration.

In 1998, he retired due to ill health. Throughout his career Barber retained his belief in the social and educational functions of theatre –

Though I have been involved in managing venues throughout my career, I regard myself as a theatre director who happens to have specialised to a certain extent in community productions.

In 2004, 'Fab Fab Fab Fab Fab!' a tribute to the work of Dominic Barber was staged at the Wilde Theatre in Bracknell. It consisted of excerpts from professional and community plays and musicals that Barber directed and was performed by many original and new cast members. It was produced by South Hill Park Arts Centre and directed by Mark Rayment.

In 2005, 'Afterlife' a public artwork dedicated to the memory of the life and work of Dominic Barber was unveiled at South Hill Park in Bracknell. The artwork is by Martin Donlin, with a text by former Poet Laureate Andrew Motion and is situated in the Tall Hall of the arts centre.

In 2006, The Castle Theatre in Wellingborough opened the 'Dominic Barber Studio', a performance and rehearsal space named after their first artistic director.

== Community productions ==
A list of stage productions with amateur actors directed by Dominic Barber:

- 1995, ANNIE, The Castle Community Theatre, Castle Theatre, Wellingborough
- 1993, THE DEVILS, Wilde Community Theatre Company, Wilde Theatre, Bracknell
- 1993, THE BOYFRIEND, East Berkshire Operatic Society, Wilde Theatre, Bracknell
- 1993, THE ADVENTURES OF MR. TOAD, Wilde Community Theatre Company, Wilde Theatre, Bracknell
- 1992, CABARET, Wilde Community Theatre Company, Wilde Theatre, Bracknell
- 1990, MEASURE FOR MEASURE, Wilde Community Theatre Company, Broadmoor Hospital, Crowthorne
- 1990, THE FANTASTIC MR. FOX, Wilde Community Theatre Company, Wilde Theatre, Bracknell
- 1989, TICKLE, Wilde Community Theatre Company, Wilde Theatre, Bracknell
- 1989, CHICAGO, Wilde Community Theatre Company, Wilde Theatre, Bracknell
- 1988, TRAFFORD TANZI, Wilde Community Theatre Company, Wilde Theatre, Bracknell
- 1988, THE LIFE AND ADVENTURES OF NICHOLAS NICKLEBY, Wilde Community Theatre Company, Wilde Theatre, Bracknell
- 1988, THE DRACULA SPECTACULA, Wilde Community Theatre Company, Wilde Theatre, Bracknell
- 1987, OEDIPUS, Wilde Community Theatre Company, Wilde Theatre, Bracknell
- 1987, ONCE A CATHOLIC, Wilde Community Theatre Company, Wilde Theatre, Bracknell
- 1987, GIRLS OF SLENDER MEANS, Wilde Community Theatre Company, Wilde Theatre, Bracknell
- 1985, THE CORONATION OF POPPAEA, Park Opera, Wilde Theatre, Bracknell
- 1985, WESTERN FLYER, Wyvern Community Drama Company, Wyvern Theatre, Swindon
- 1984, MY FAIR LADY, Wyvern Community Drama Company, Wyvern Theatre, Swindon
- 1983, OLIVER, Wyvern Community Drama Company, Wyvern Theatre, Swindon
- 1983, OUR WAR, Anonymous Company, Maddermarket Theatre, Norwich

== Professional productions ==
A list of stage productions with professional actors directed by Dominic Barber:

- 1998, WHEN SANTA GOT STUCK UP THE CHIMNEY!, Castle Theatre, Wellingborough
- 1997, THE GINGERBREAD MAN, Castle Theatre, Wellingborough
- 1996, THE ADVENTURES OF MR TOAD, Castle Theatre, Wellingborough
- 1995, CHRISTMAS CAT AND THE PUDDING PIRATES, Castle Theatre, Wellingborough
- 1993, WHEN DINAH SAW A DINOSAUR, Wilde Theatre, Bracknell
- 1992, THE IDEAL GNOME EXPEDITION, Wilde Theatre, Bracknell
- 1991, THE GINGERBREAD MAN, Wilde Theatre, Bracknell
- 1991, JAMES AND THE GIANT PEACH, The Maltings Arts Centre, UK Tour
- 1990, MONTY MOONBEAM'S MAGNIFICENT MISSION, Muffin Productions, Wilde Theatre, Bracknell
- 1989, CHRISTMAS CAT AND THE PUDDING PIRATES, Muffin Productions, Wilde Theatre, Bracknell
- 1989, RON AND RAMON, Edinburgh Fringe Festival
- 1989, THE TRAGEDY OF CARMEN, Thameside Opera, Wilde Theatre, Bracknell (UK Premiere)
- 1988, THE SNOW QUEEN, Kaboodle Productions, Wilde Theatre, Bracknell
- 1988, AN OCCURRENCE AT OWL CREEK BRIDGE, Thameside Opera, Wilde Theatre, Bracknell (World Premiere)
- 1987, THE UGLY DUCKLING, Wilde Theatre, Bracknell
- 1986, THE LOST DOMAINE, Wilde Theatre, Bracknell (World Premiere)
- 1985, OLD KING COLE, Wilde Theatre, Bracknell
- 1984, JACK AND THE BEANSTALK, Palace Theatre, Redditch
