= Almonaster Avenue Bridge =

New Orleans road/rail bridge

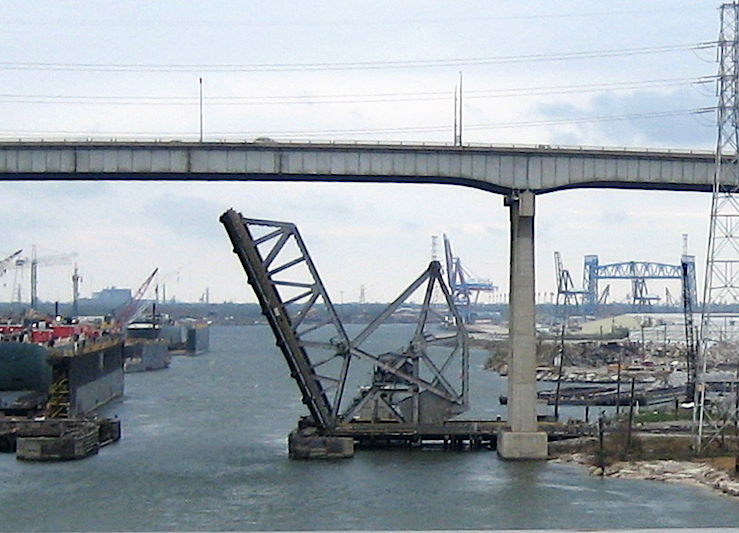
- View from the Danziger Bridge looking riverwards, with the large I-10 highrise bridge and the smaller Almonaster Avenue Bridge in raised position below and behind it.
- Coordinates: 30°00′16″N 90°01′33″W
- Carries: Almonaster Avenue, railroad tracks
- Crosses: Industrial Canal
- Locale: New Orleans, Louisiana

Characteristics
- Design: bascule bridge

History
- Construction end: 1919

Location
- Interactive map of Almonaster Avenue Bridge

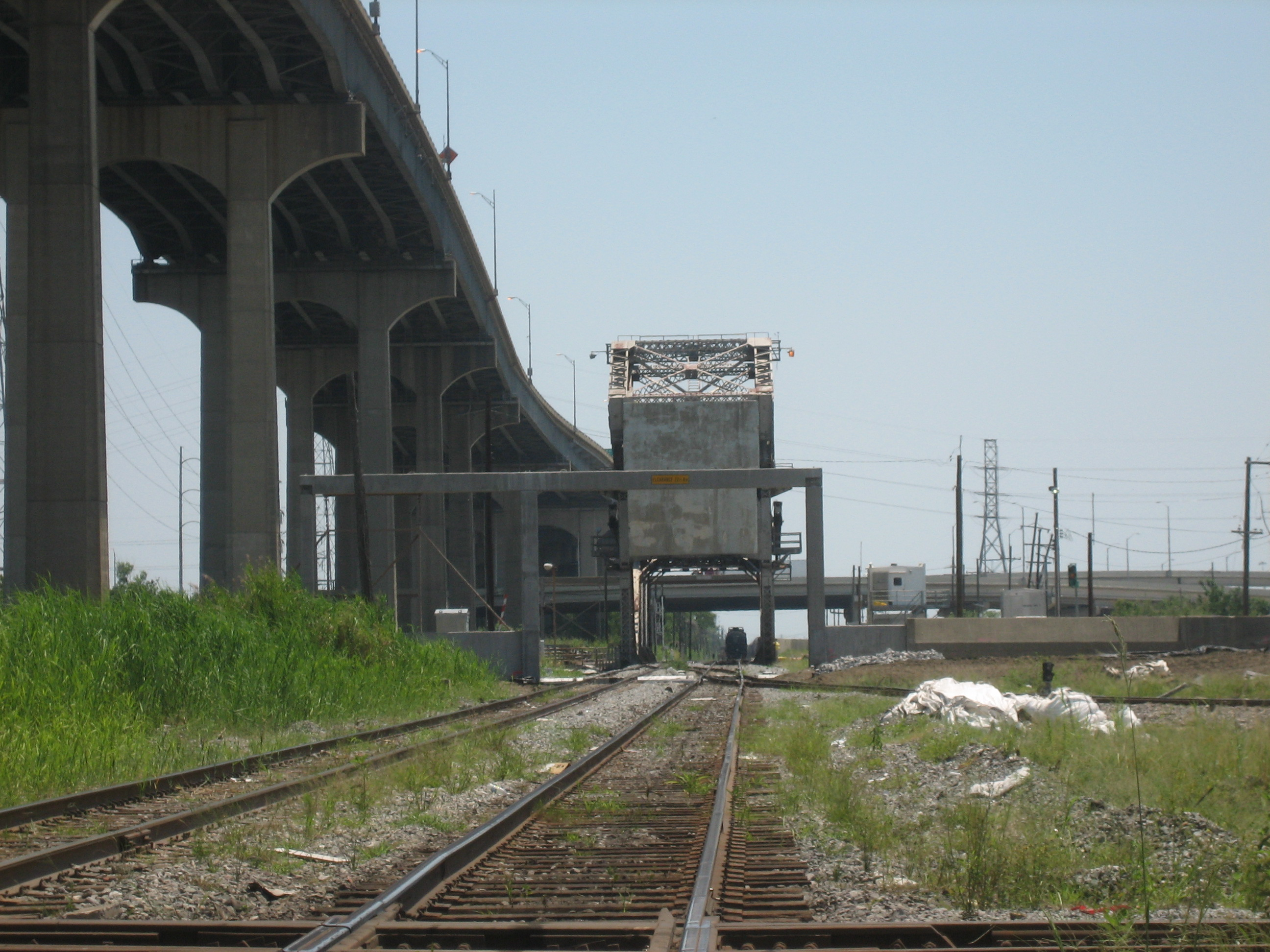
The bridge lowered to allow a train to cross the Industrial Canal, seen from the upper 9th Ward side of the Canal

The Almonaster Avenue Bridge is a bascule bridge in New Orleans, Louisiana. The bridge has two vehicular lanes of Almonaster Avenue and two railroad tracks over the Industrial Canal.

The bridge is named after Almonaster Avenue on which it is built. It is one of the first four bridges built by the Port of New Orleans and was completed in 1919 in order to provide railroad access across the Inner Harbor-Navigational Canal, locally referred to as the Industrial Canal. Besides Almonaster Bridge, two of the sister bridges at St. Claude Avenue and Seabrook, remain in service today.

The bridge also served to re-connect Old Gentilly Road, which had been severed by the construction of the Industrial Canal. (Almonaster Avenue did not exist at this point.) Old Gentilly Road was part of the Old Spanish Trail and provided the only vehicular route east out of New Orleans at the time. U.S. Route 90 was routed over the bridge from 1926 until 1932, when the original Danziger Bridge on the new Chef Menteur Highway was completed to the north.

The bridge has a horizontal clearance of 83 feet (25 m) with unlimited vertical clearance when fully retracted.

The Almonaster Bridge provides two vehicular lanes and a single railroad track crossing down the center of the span.

Since Hurricane Katrina destroyed the roadways leading up to it, the bridge now normally stays in the up position, being lowered as needed for rail traffic. The Port of New Orleans, the Regional Planning Commission, and the Louisiana Department of Transportation and Development have an ongoing feasibility study underway for replacing the bridge with a modern structure.
