= Pontalba =

- Opera by Thea Musgrave
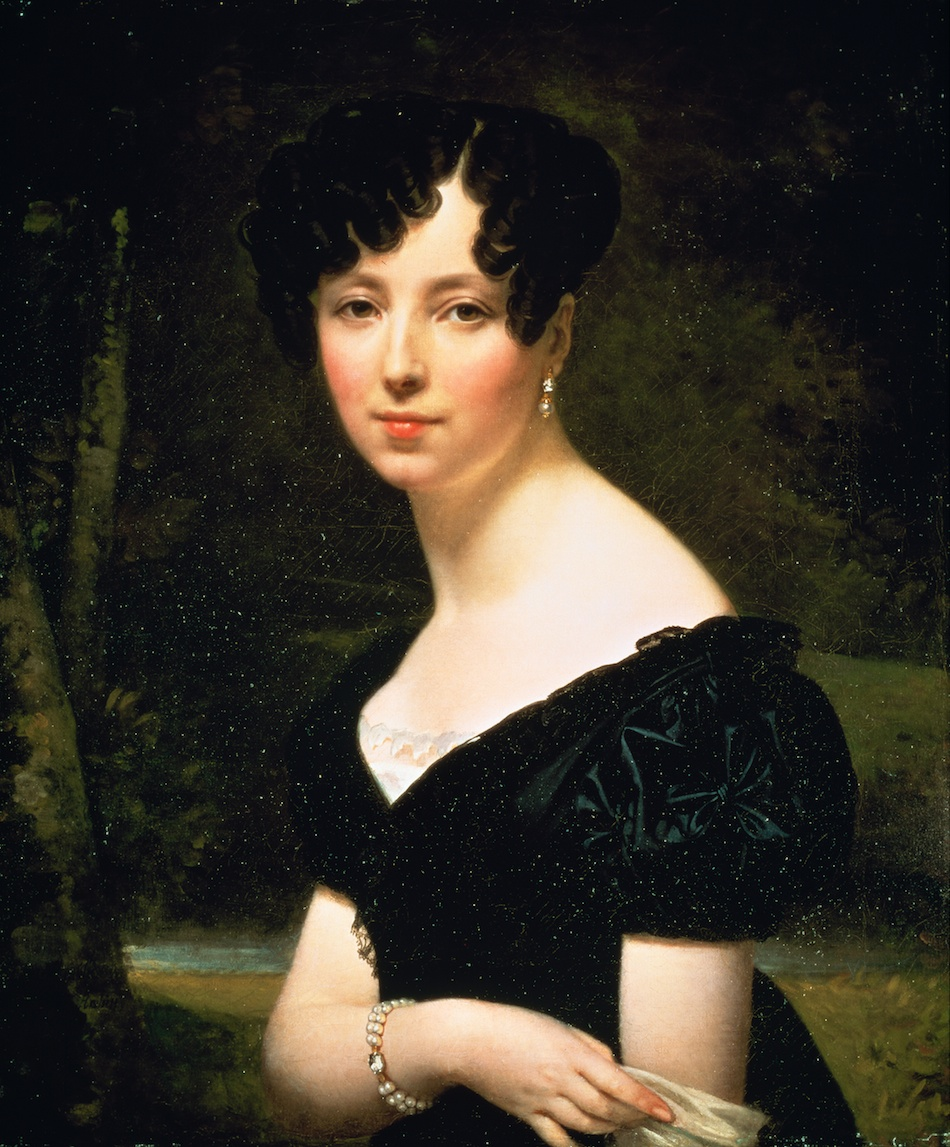
- Portrait of Micaela Almonester, Baroness de Pontalba on whose life the opera is based
- Librettist: Thea Musgrave
- Language: English
- Premiere: 2 October 2003; Mahalia Jackson Theater, New Orleans

Pontalba is an opera in two acts composed by Thea Musgrave. Musgrave also wrote the libretto which is loosely based on the life of Micaela Almonester, Baroness de Pontalba, a prominent figure in 19th-century New Orleans. The opera was commissioned by New Orleans Opera to celebrate the two hundredth anniversary of the Louisiana Purchase. It premiered on 2 October 2003 at the Mahalia Jackson Theater in New Orleans conducted by Robert Lyall with Yali-Marie Williams in the title role.

== Background and performance history ==
In 2001 New Orleans Opera commissioned Thea Musgrave to compose a new opera for the 2003 celebrations of the Louisiana Purchase bicentennial. On the suggestion of the company's General Director Robert Lyall, Musgrave chose Micaela Almonester, Baroness de Pontalba as her subject. Born in New Orleans and a wealthy heiress in her own right, Micaela Almonester married her mentally unstable French cousin, Célestin de Pontalba in 1811 and eventually moved to France where she became a virtual prisoner at the de Pontalba chateau near Senlis. In 1834, having failed to gain possession of Almonester's inheritance, her father-in-law shot her four times at point-blank range with a pair of duelling pistols and then committed suicide. She survived the attack, eventually obtained a legal separation from her husband and returned to New Orleans in 1848 where she stayed until 1851. During her time there she became a central figure in the city's intellectual, social, and commercial life.

As with most of her operas, Musgrave herself wrote the libretto (originally called The Pontalba Affair), loosely basing it on Intimate Enemies, Christina Vella's 1997 biography of Micaela Almonester. Musgrave added some fictional characters and took several liberties with the historical facts, most notably making Almonester 10 years older so that her marriage to Celestin de Pontalba would take place around the time of the Louisiana Purchase. According to the British magazine Opera, New Orleans Opera ended up spending a million dollars on the Pontalba project. In the face of rising costs the company was forced to cancel the performances of The Tales of Hoffmann, its only other planned production for the 2003 Autumn season. Excerpts from the score were previewed in New York City in May 2003 in a concert celebrating Musgrave's 75th birthday. The complete opera premiered on 2 October 2003 at the Mahalia Jackson Theater in New Orleans. The production was conducted by Robert Lyall and directed by Jay Lesenger with the sets designed by Erhard Rom and the lighting by Dan Darnutzer. Pontalba had two more performances on 4 and 5 October 2003. It has not received any further performances since that time.

== Roles ==
Role	Voice type	Premiere cast, 2 October 2003 (Conductor: Robert Lyall)
Micaela Almonester	soprano	Yali-Marie Williams
Louise Almonester, Micaela's mother	mezzo-soprano	Jane Gilbert
Celestin de Pontalba, Micaela's husband	tenor	Robert Breault
Baron Pontalba, Celestin's father	bass-baritone	Jake Gardner
Jeanne Loiuse de Pontalba, Celestin's mother	soprano	Kathryn Day
Mr Monroe, the Almonesters' lawyer	baritone	Ray Fellman
Jacques Dupin, the Pontalbas' lawyer	tenor	Enrique Toral
Cassie, the Almonesters' servant	soprano	Fahnlohnee Harris
Mayor of New Orleans	baritone	Charles Robert Stephens
Jean-Baptiste Castillion, Micaela's stepfather	tenor	John Giraud
Ernestine	(speaking role)	Kitty Cleveland
People of New Orleans
