= Thomas Rolf Truhitte =

American heldentenor

Thomas Rolf Truhitte is an American heldentenor who has become noted in recent years for his roles in Wagnerian operas. The son of actor Daniel Truhitte, his middle name is a tribute to his father's most famous role as "Rolf" in the movie adaptation of The Sound of Music.

Thomas was in the resident company of Opera San Jose from 1997 to 2001 and appeared there in 11 productions, in many leading roles.

== Performances ==
=== Festival dei Due Mondi, Spoleto, Italy ===
- Lohengrin (Richard Wagner) - "Lohengrin"

=== Minnesota Opera ===
- Der Fliegende Hollaender (Richard Wagner) - "Erik"

=== San Jose Opera ===
- Carmen (Georges Bizet) - "Don José "

=== Manaus Music Festival, Brazil ===
- Die Walküre Richard Wagner - "Siegmund"

=== Opera San Jose ===
- Rigoletto (Giuseppe Verdi) - "Duke"
- La bohème (Giacomo Puccini - "Moman"
- Eugene Onegin (Peter Ilyich Tchaikovsky) - "Lenski"
- La traviata (Giuseppe Verdi) - "Alfredo"
- Carmen (Georges Bizet) - "Don Jose"
- Die lustige Witwe (Franz Lehár) - "Danilo"
- Don Giovanni (Wolfgang Amadeus Mozart) - "Don Giovanni"
- The Rake's Progress (Igor Stravinsky - "Tom"
- Die Zauberflöte (Wolfgang Amadeus Mozart) - "Susan"
- Lucia di Lammermoor (Gaetano Donizetti) - "Edgardo"
- Of Mice and Men (Carlisle Floyd) - "Curley"

=== San Jose Opera ===
- Carmen (Georges Bizet) - "Don Jose"

=== Minnesota Opera ===
- Carmen (Georges Bizet) - "Don Jose"

=== Venice Opera ===
- Fidelio - "Florestan
- Madama Butterfly - "Pinkerton"
- Tristan und Isolde - "Tristan"
- Die Walküre (Richard Wagner) - "Siegmund"
