= Almonaster Avenue =

Road in New Orleans, Louisiana, United States

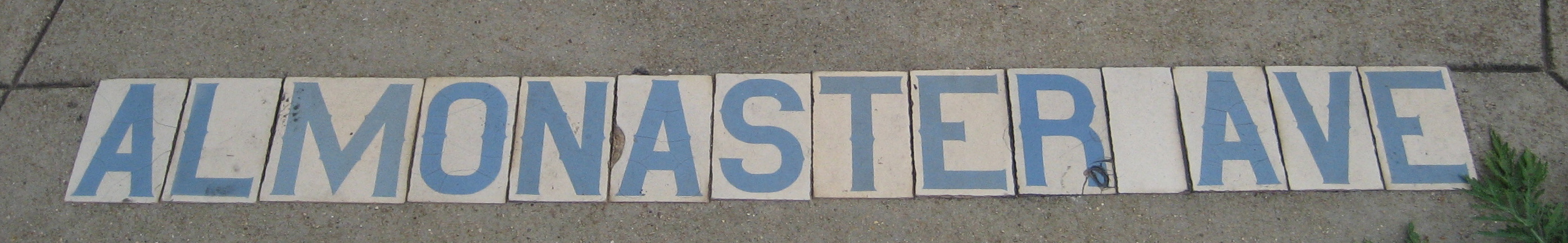
Street tiles, Marigny neighborhood

Almonaster Avenue is a four-lane divided road in New Orleans, Louisiana, United States, named after 18th-century Spanish philanthropist Don Andres Almonaster y Rojas. It forms in the residential neighborhoods of the Upper Ninth Ward by branching off at a Y-type intersection with Franklin Avenue. Shortly afterwards, the road elevates on an overpass to cross the Norfolk Southern Railway and returns to ground level as it crosses the Industrial Canal on the Almonaster Avenue Bridge, a bascule bridge that it shares with CSX Transportation, proceeding into New Orleans East. The traffic lanes straddle the railroad bridge on either side; this is the only location where Almonaster becomes a two-lane road, albeit divided. It is also the last of the combination railroad/automobile movable bridges. It winds through the New Orleans Business and Industrial District (NO BID) parallel with the Mississippi River Gulf Outlet and Gulf Intracoastal Waterway. It intersects with Interstate 510 before finally ending at the junction with U.S. Highway 90.

In November 2024, two people were killed and ten injured when gunfire broke out at a second line parade on the Avenue. In June 2025, two people were killed on Almonaster Avenue when they were hit by a speeding motorist.
