= Mont-l'Évêque =

- Commune
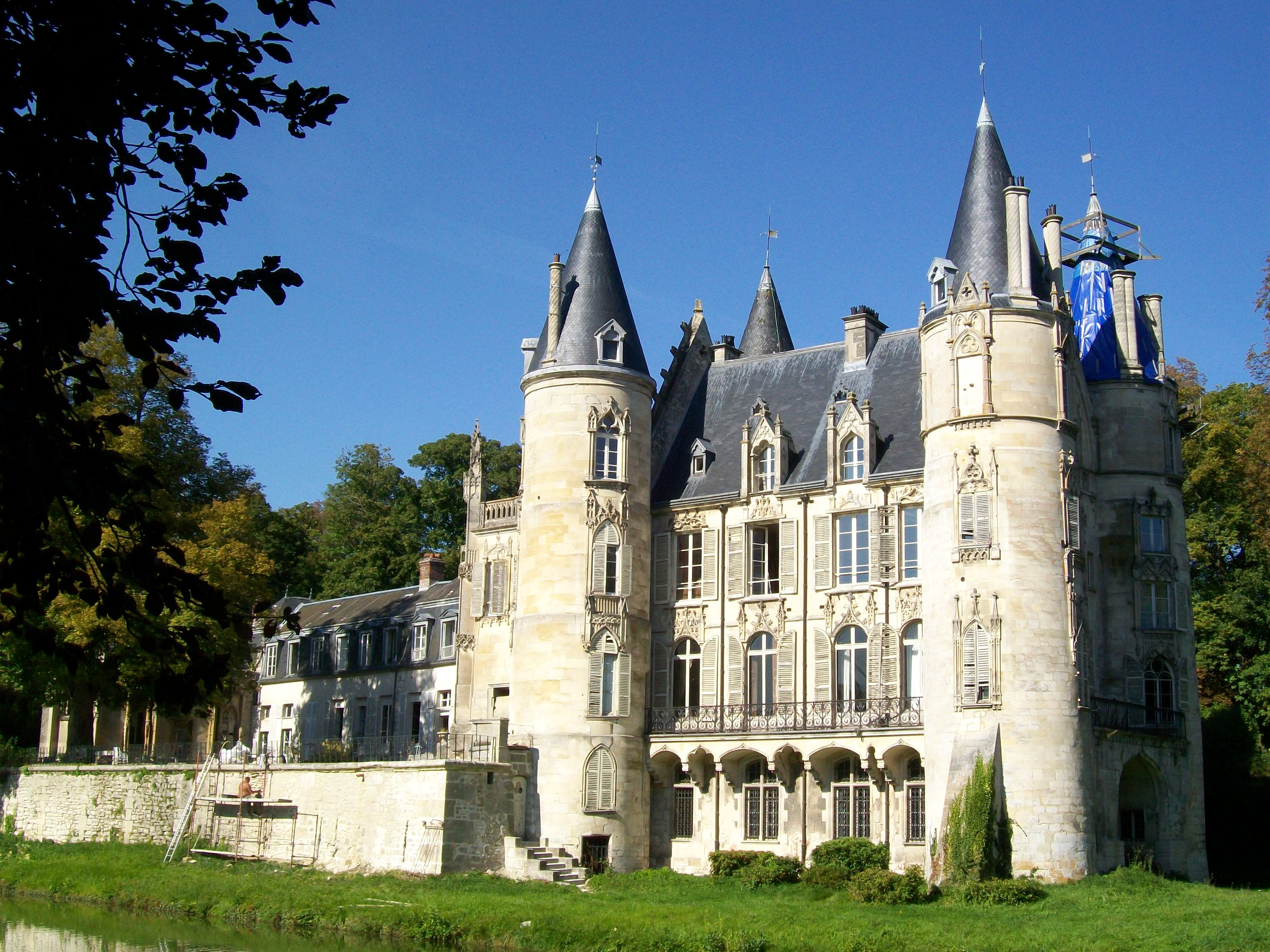
- The chateau in Mont-l'Évêque

- Coat of arms
- Location of Mont-l'Évêque
- Location within France Location within Hauts-de-France
- Coordinates: 49°11′43″N 2°37′54″E
- Country: France
- Region: Hauts-de-France
- Department: Oise
- Arrondissement: Senlis
- Canton: Senlis

Government
  - Mayor (2020–2026): Michelle Lozano
- Area^{1}: 14.18 km^{2} (5.47 sq mi)
- Elevation: 77 m (253 ft)
- Highest elevation: 80 m (260 ft)
- Lowest elevation: 57 m (187 ft)
- Population (2023): 416
  - Density: 29.3/km^{2} (76.0/sq mi)
- Time zone: UTC+01:00 (CET)
  - Summer (DST): UTC+02:00 (CEST)
- INSEE/Postal code: 60421 /60300
- ^{1} French Land Register data, which excludes lakes, ponds, glaciers > 1 km^{2} (0.386 sq mi or 247 acres) and river estuaries.

Mont-l'Évêque (French pronunciation: [mɔ̃ levɛk]) is a commune in the Oise department in northern France.

== See also ==
- Communes of the Oise department
