= Peter Mark (conductor) =

American conductor and violist (born 1940)

Peter Mark (born 31 October 1940, New York) is an American violist, conductor, opera teacher, and the artistic director emeritus of the Virginia Opera, where he served as General and artistic director from 1975 to 2010.

== Career ==
As a child Mark performed as a boy soprano at the Metropolitan Opera Children's Chorus and in 1955 took on the role of Shepherd Boy in a production of Tosca by Dino Yannopoulos. He later attended Columbia University from 1956 to 1961. Consecutive with his senior year at Columbia, he enrolled at The Juilliard School of Music (1960–1965) studying first as a violin pupil of Joseph Fuchs and then as a viola pupil of Walter Trampler. He served as the principal violist of the Juilliard Orchestra under Jean Morel from 1960 to 1963.

The year before leaving Juilliard, Mark was appointed as principal violist of the Chicago Lyric Opera in their 1964 and 1966 seasons. During this period he was recruited to teach viola and opera at the University of California, Santa Barbara (1965–1992). There he first met the Scottish composer, fellow professor and wife-to-be, Thea Musgrave, who was teaching as a guest professor. Whilst there, she wrote her viola and cello duet Elegy for Peter Mark. While taking a year-long sabbatical from his professorship, Mark became Assistant Principal Violist at the Los Angeles Philharmonic (1968-9). Mark married Musgrave in 1971. In 1973, Musgrave wrote her Viola Concerto(1973) for him, which Mark premiered at the BBC Proms that year with the Royal Scottish National Orchestra and Musgrave conducting. Spending more and more time in the UK and Europe, Mark took up a teaching position in the newly-merged Royal Northern College of Music in Manchester, UK (1974-75).

In 1975 Mark returned with his wife to America, where he served as conductor, artistic and general director of the Virginia Opera. Over thirty-five years in the role, Mark gave over 700 performances of 110 different productions including the US premiere of Musgrave's seminal opera Mary, Queen of Scots in 1977 and the world premiere of her fifth opera A Christmas Carol(1979) which was commissioned by the house. Mark conducted the forces of the Royal Opera House at Sadler’s Wells in the European premiere of the work, which was later broadcast by Granada TV. Since 2013, Mark has worked as an opera coach working predominantly with North and South American singers in Los Angeles and New York City.
