= Pontalba Buildings =

- U.S. National Register of Historic Places
- U.S. National Historic Landmark
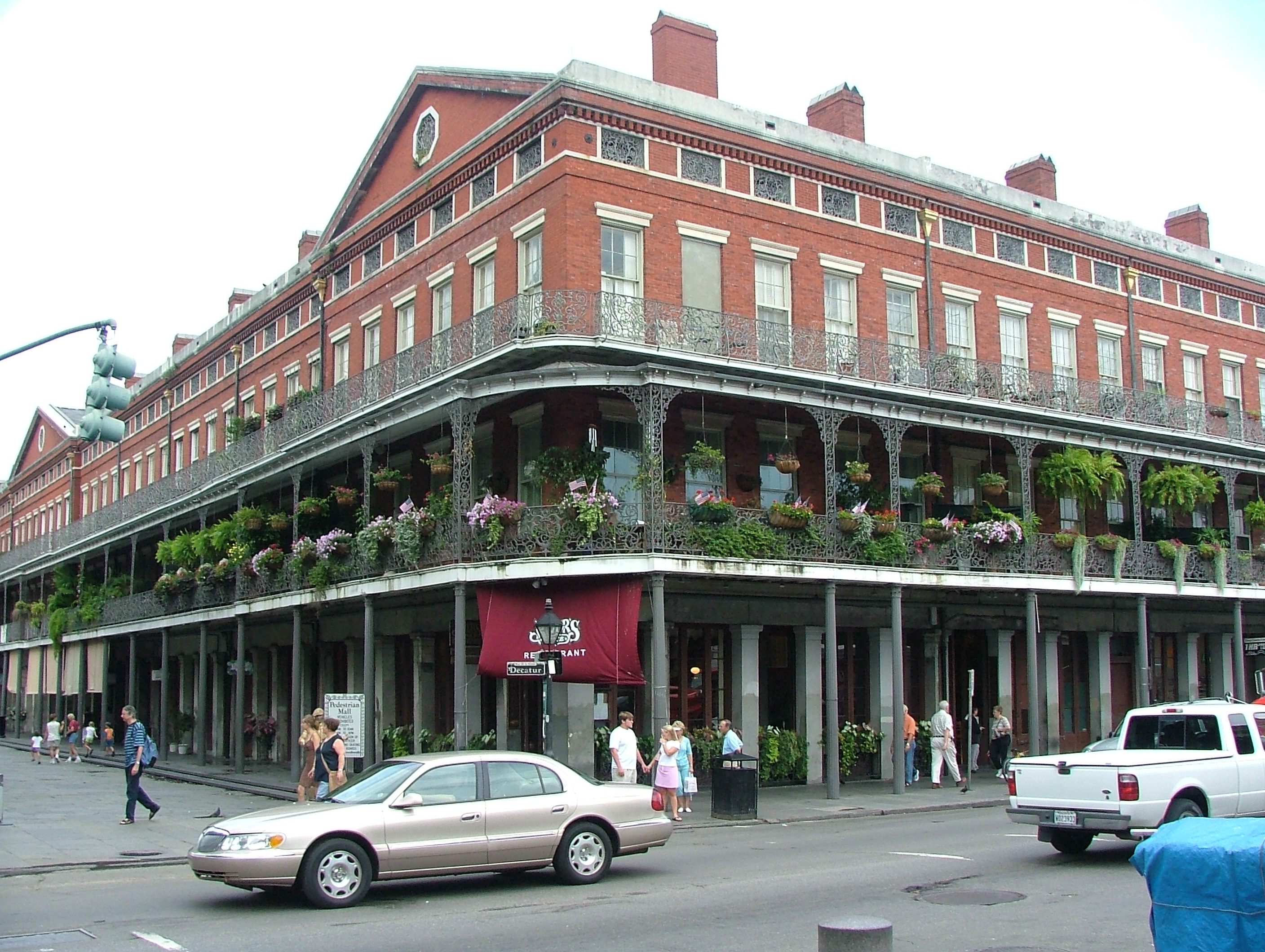

- Location within East New Orleans Location within Louisiana Location within the United States
- Location: 500 St. Ann Street & 500 St. Peter Street, New Orleans, Louisiana
- Coordinates: 29°57′26.75″N 90°3′46.01″W
- Built: 1850 (Upper building); 1851 (Lower building)
- Architect: James Gallier; Henry Howard
- NRHP reference No.: 74000934

Significant dates
- Added to NRHP: May 30, 1974
- Designated NHL: May 30, 1974

The Pontalba Buildings form two sides of Jackson Square in the French Quarter of New Orleans, Louisiana. They are matching red-brick, one-block-long, four‑story buildings built between 1849–1851 by the Baroness Micaela Almonester Pontalba. The ground floors house shops and restaurants; and the upper floors are apartments which, reputedly, are the oldest continuously rented such apartments in the United States.

== History and description ==
Baroness Pontalba, an accomplished businesswoman, invested in real estate, purchasing the land on the upriver and downriver sides of the Place d'Armes. She constructed two Parisian-style row house buildings between 1849–1851, at a cost of over $300,000. The buildings include the first recorded instance in the city of the use of cast iron 'galleries', which set a fashion that soon became the most prominent feature of the city's residential architecture. The cast-iron panels in the first floor balustrade feature her initials, 'AP', intertwined in the design.

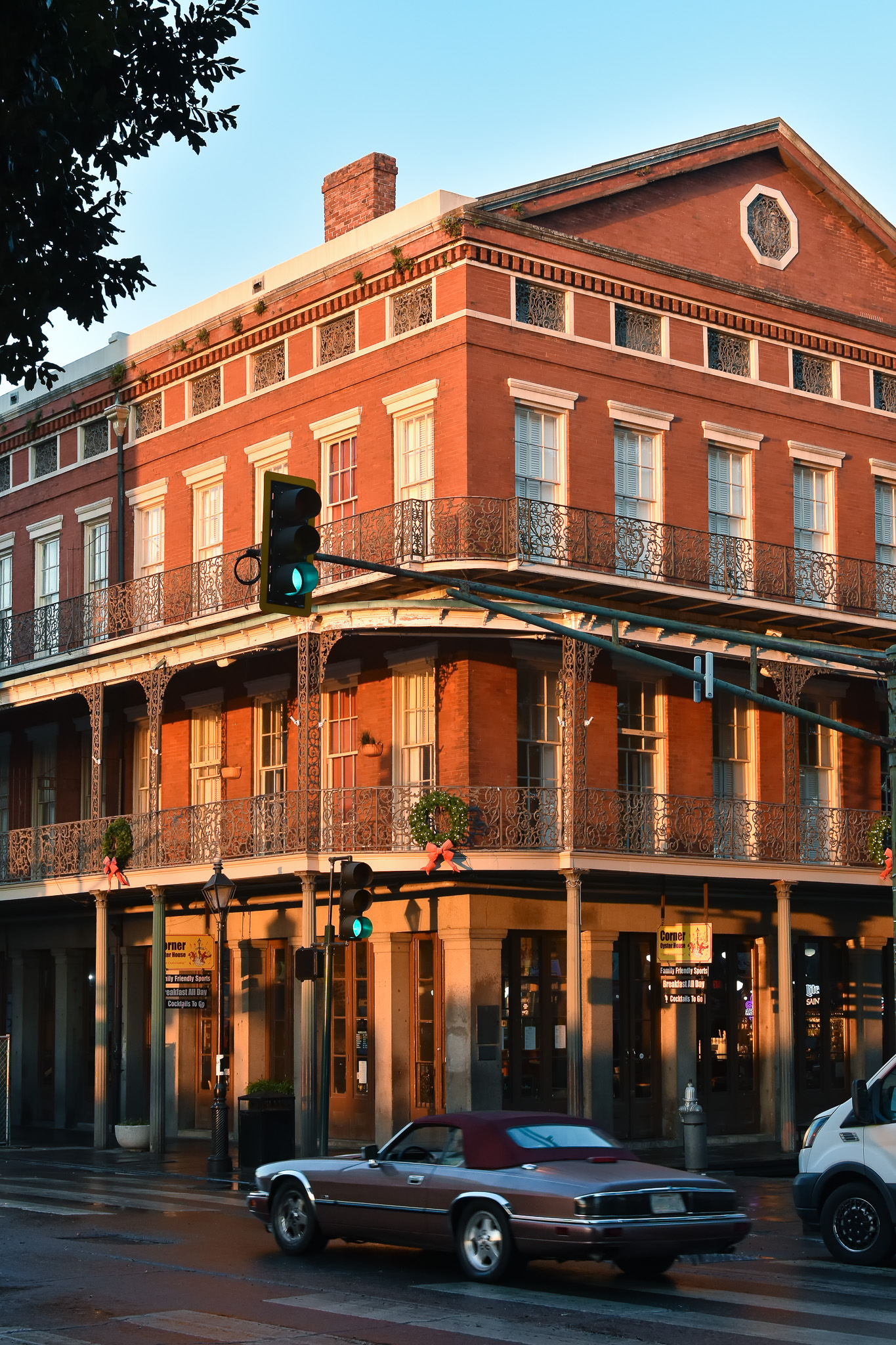
The facade of the Pontalba Buildings featuring ornate iron work.

The building fronting Rue St. Peter, upriver from Jackson Square, is the upper Pontalba. The building on the other side, fronting Rue St. Ann, is the lower Pontalba Building.

Baroness Pontalba died in France in 1874, and the Pontalba family retained ownership of the buildings until the 1920s; but they did not take an interest in the townhouses, so they fell into disrepair. The heirs sold the lower building to local philanthropist William Ratcliffe Irby, who in turn bequeathed the property to the Louisiana State Museum. Local civic leaders acquired the upper building, which they sold to a foundation in 1930, the Pontalba Building Museum Association. The foundation turned the upper building over to the City of New Orleans, which has owned it since the 1930s.

According to Christina Vella, historian of modern Europe, the Pontalba Buildings were not the first apartment buildings in the present-day U.S., as is commonly believed. They were originally built as row houses, not rental apartments. The row houses were turned into apartments during the 1930s renovations (during the Great Depression).

In the short story "Hidden Gardens," Truman Capote describes them as "the oldest, in some ways most somberly elegant, apartment houses in America, the Pontalba Buildings."

They were declared a National Historic Landmark in 1974 for their early and distinctive architecture.

== See also ==
- List of National Historic Landmarks in Louisiana
- National Register of Historic Places listings in Orleans Parish, Louisiana
- Hôtel de Pontalba
