= Harrison Opera House =

Music venue in Norfolk, Virginia, US

Edythe C. and Stanley L. Harrison Opera House
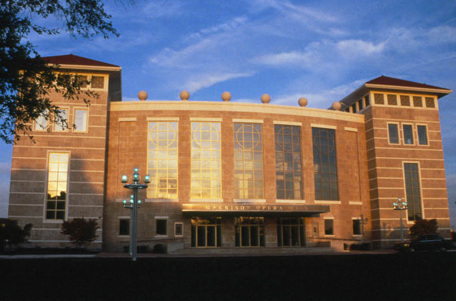
- Interactive map of Edythe C. and Stanley L. Harrison Opera House
- Address: 160 Virginia Beach Blvd. Norfolk, Virginia; United States
- Coordinates: 36°51′30″N 76°17′24″W
- Owner: City of Norfolk
- Operator: City of Norfolk
- Capacity: 1,632
- Type: Opera house

Construction
- Opened: 1943 (as Norfolk Center Theater)
- Reopened: 1993 (renovated as Harrison Opera)

Website
- www.sevenvenues.com

The Edythe C. and Stanley L. Harrison Opera House, also known as the Harrison Opera House, is the official home of the Virginia Opera in the Neon District of Downtown Norfolk on the border of the Ghent Square neighborhood.

Built as a public works auditorium, this theatre served as a venue for World War II USO shows. The theater was known previously as Norfolk Center Theater. The venue was renovated by architecture firm, GUND Partnership, reopening in 1993 as a dedicated opera facility with a 1,632 seating capacity. The building originally contained both the USO/Center Theater along with the adjoining former Norfolk Municipal Auditorium, which now serves as storage and administrative space for the Virginia Opera.

The opera house is named after Stanley and Edythe Harrison, a former member of the Virginia House of Delegates and founding president of the Virginia Opera.
