= The Voice of Ariadne =

1972 opera by Thea Musgrave

- Opera by Thea Musgrave
- Librettist: Thea Musgrave
- Language: English
- Premiere: 1974; Aldeburgh Festival

The Voice of Ariadne is a chamber opera by Thea Musgrave, her first opera, completed in 1972. She set a libretto by Amalia Elguera based on a story by Henry James. The opera premiered in 1974 at the Aldeburgh Festival.

== History ==
The Voice of Ariadne was the first opera that Musgrave has composed, completed in 1972. In three acts, it is based on the Greek myth of Ariadne. The libretto was written by the Peruvian writer Amalia Elguera, adapted from a story by Henry James.

Te opera was premiered in 1974 at the Aldeburgh Festival. The US premiere was given by the New York City Opera in 1977.
