= Virginia Opera =

American opera company

Virginia Opera is an opera company based in the Commonwealth of Virginia which was first organized in 1974 by a group of Norfolk, Virginia community volunteers.

In September 1974, Thomas A. Lipton was engaged to produce a fully professional production of Puccini's La bohème to ascertain the prospects for successful establishment of a professional opera company for the Virginia Opera Association. Lipton had been recommended to VOA president Edythe Harrison by the late David Baber, director of the National Opera Institute, a part of the National Endowment for the Arts music promotional program.

Within the next five months, Lipton hired the conductor John Edward Niles as Music Director and together they assembled a production staff, soloists, chorus and technicians. Auditions were held in New York City and locally. Among others selected by Lipton was Dr. David Farrar.

Following performances on January 25 and 27, 1975, Virginia Opera was launched on a professional basis. The company has an annual budget of $5 million with over 30 performances, reaching nearly 50,000 attendees each season.

In March 1994, by unanimous vote of the Virginia General Assembly, Virginia Opera was named The Official Opera Company of the Commonwealth of Virginia in recognition of the organization's contribution to the Commonwealth, and to the world of opera.

Virginia Opera currently presents four productions a year at four major Virginia venues: Norfolk's Harrison Opera House, Richmond's Carpenter Theatre at Richmond CenterStage, George Mason University's Center for the Arts in Fairfax, and the Sandler Center for the Performing Arts in Virginia Beach. Virginia Opera is the only opera company to perform a full season of operas in multiple mainstage venues and to reach more than 150,000 students and community members each year through its Education and Outreach Program.

== Beginnings ==
Organized in 1974 by founding chair Edythe C. Harrison, Virginia Opera was launched with two productions in the Norfolk Center Theater. David Farrar was the founding stage director and director of productions of the Virginia Opera. He was there for twelve years, during which the company experienced a period of tremendous growth. Farrar invited Peter Mark to the company and Mark was appointed artistic director, a position he held for over 35 years. He was named artistic director emeritus in 2012. Russell P. Allen, appointed president and CEO in 2011, currently leads the company, returning to Virginia Opera after previously serving six years as general manager from 1994 to 2000.

The company's first three seasons were limited to Norfolk. Expansion to Richmond began in 1977 with the encouragement of then-governor Mills Godwin and Anna Garner, under whose leadership "The Richmond Friends of Opera" was formed to present Virginia Opera productions annually in Richmond. By 1983, the Richmond and Central Virginia Board of Virginia Opera was formed and a Richmond office was opened. In November 1992, the company presented its first mainstage performance at the Center for the Arts at George Mason University in Fairfax.

== Artists ==
Various prominent singers have appeared on the company's stages and in concert. These have included Luciano Pavarotti, Beverly Sills, Renée Fleming, Diana Soviero, Lawrence Brownlee, Barbara Dever, Jeannine Altmeyer, Ashley Putnam, Cristina Nassif, Frederick Burchinal, John Aler, Rockwell Blake, Randy Locke, Jake Gardner, Sujung Kim, Frank Porretta, Grant Youngblood, Fabiana Bravo, Mary Elizabeth Williams, Nmon Ford, Jeniece Goldbourne, Randall Scarlata, and Thomas Rolf Truhitte.

== Virginia Opera repertoire, 1974 to 2015 ==
The first few seasons consisted of standard works such as La boheme, La traviata, Tosca, Lucia di Lammermoor and The Barber of Seville, all presented in the 1975 to 1976 period.

Many standard works are still performed, but each season typically contains a variety of operatic styles from different eras. Added to these have been productions of American musicals such as Man of La Mancha (1987), West Side Story (1994), Carousel (1996) Oklahoma! (1997), Sweeney Todd (September/October 2014) as well as several comic operas by Gilbert and Sullivan such as The Pirates of Penzance (1999 and 2022), The Mikado (2001) and HMS Pinafore (2014).

While many of productions have focused on the standard repertory of popular operas which are frequently performed by most companies, Virginia Opera is also noted for its innovative programming of rarer or new works. These are noted below.

=== Works performed in the non-standard repertoire ===
The company has produced notable world and American premieres of new works, including most recently American composer Ricky Ian Gordon's and librettist Mark Campbell's Rappahannock County, a Civil War song cycle co-commissioned by Virginia Opera, the Virginia Arts Festival, the Modlin Center of the University of Richmond, and the University of Texas at Austin. Rappahannock County premiered in Norfolk on April 12, 2011, the 150th anniversary of the firing upon Fort Sumter, South Carolina.

Earlier world and American premieres included operas by Scottish-American composer Thea Musgrave, including Mary, Queen of Scots (1975—77),A Christmas Carol (1978—79), Harriet, The Woman Called Moses (1984), and Simon Bolivar (1992).

Amongst some of the more unusual operas performed over 40 years were the double bill of Mozart's The Impresario along with the popular Pagliacci in March/April 1977.

The baroque era has been well represented by Handel's Giulio Cesare in early 1997, his Rodelinda in February 2000 and Agrippina in early 2007. Stagings of some bel canto classics not so often performed in the 1980s such as Bellini's I Capuleti e i Montecchi in Spring 1981, Norma in October 1983 and again in January 1994, along with Donizetti's Anna Bolena in January 1989 reflect a broad approach to the repertoire.

Amongst several of Wagner's operas, The Flying Dutchman entered the repertory in January/February 1996, while Die Walküre followed in the fall of 2002 and again in early 2011.

Richard Strauss is represented by Ariadne auf Naxos in 2014, although it was given several times over the earlier years, and there have been several productions of Salome, the next appearing in January/February 2015. Elektra was given in early 2002.

In addition to the Musgrave premieres, other 20th century American works have included Porgy and Bess several times beginning in 1980; Menotti's Amahl and the Night Visitors in December 1982 and his The Medium in early 1992; Andre Previn's 1998 A Streetcar Named Desire was seen in February/March 2013; Aaron Copland's The Tender Land appeared in early 1998; and Carlisle Floyd's Susannah was staged in November 2006.
