= Thea Musgrave =

Scottish composer (born 1928)

Thea Musgrave CBE
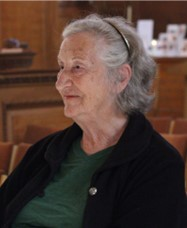
- Musgrave in 2017
- Born: 27 May 1928; Barnton, Edinburgh, UK
- Education: University of Edinburgh
- Occupations: Composer; Academic teacher
- Organizations: University of California, Santa Barbara
- Awards: Koussevitzky Award; Queen's Medal for Music

Thea Musgrave CBE (born 27 May 1928) is a Scottish composer of opera and classical music. She has lived in the United States since 1972.

== Biography ==
Born in Barnton, Edinburgh, Musgrave was educated at Moreton Hall School, a boarding independent school for girls near the market town of Oswestry in Shropshire, followed by the University of Edinburgh, and in Paris as a pupil of Nadia Boulanger from 1950 to 1954. In 1958 she attended the Tanglewood Festival and studied with Aaron Copland.

In 1970 she became guest professor at the University of California, Santa Barbara, a position which confirmed her increasing involvement with the musical life of the United States. She married American violist and opera conductor Peter Mark in 1971. From 1987 to 2002 she was distinguished professor at Queens College, City University of New York.

Among Musgrave's earlier orchestral works, the Concerto for Orchestra of 1967 and the Concerto for Horn of 1971 display the composer's ongoing fascination with 'dramatic-abstract' musical ideas. More recent works continue the idea though sometimes in a more programmatic way: such as the oboe concerto Helios of 1994, in which the soloist represents the Sun God. Another frequent source of inspiration is the visual arts – The Seasons took its initial inspiration from a visit to New York's Metropolitan Museum of Art, while Turbulent Landscapes (commissioned by the Boston Symphony Orchestra and premiered by them in 2003) depicts a series of paintings by J. M. W. Turner.

She has written more than a dozen operas and other music theatre works, many taking a historical figure as their central character, among them Mary, Queen of Scots (1977), Harriet Tubman (Harriet, the Woman called Moses, 1984), Simón Bolívar (1993; premiere 1995 at the Virginia Opera) and Pontalba (2003). In 2008, her 80th birthday was marked by premieres of Points of View, Green, Cantilena, Taking Turns and other performances.

In 2018, coinciding with Musgrave's 90th birthday, her compositions were performed at the Edinburgh International Festival and the BBC Proms. The opera Mary Queen of Scots made its ENO premiere in London on 15 February 2025, in a co-production with San Francisco Opera. In 2018, the East Coast premiere of Aurora, (1999), was performed at the Naumburg Orchestral Concerts, in the Naumburg Bandshell, Central Park, in the summer series.

== Reflections on a musical career ==
In response to a question presented by Tom Service for the BBC about Musgrave's view of being a 'woman composer' she replied, "Yes I am a woman, and I am a composer. But rarely at the same time". She admits that pursuing music can be a difficult career. When asked by the BBC to offer advice to young composers, she replied, "Don't do it, unless you have to. And if you do, enjoy every minute of it."

== Honours and awards ==
- Musgrave has received the Koussevitzky Award (1974) as well as two Guggenheim Fellowships (1974/5 and 1982/3).
- She holds honorary degrees from Old Dominion University (Virginia), Glasgow University, Smith College, the New England Conservatory of Music in Boston, and the Royal Conservatoire of Scotland.
- In 2002 she was appointed a Commander of the Order of the British Empire (CBE) in the Queen's New Year Honours List.
- She was awarded the Queen's Medal for Music, 2017.

== Works ==
=== Orchestral ===
- Chamber Concerto No. 2 (1966; chamber ensemble)
- Night Music (1968; for chamber orchestra – J. W. Chester/Edition Wilhelm Hansen London Ltd.)
- Concerto for Orchestra (1967; orchestra)
- Clarinet Concerto (1969; clarinet, orchestra)
- Night Music (1969; horns, orchestra)
- Memento Vitae (1969–70; orchestra)
- Concerto for Horn (1971; horn, orchestra)
- Viola Concerto (1973; viola, orchestra)
- The Seasons (1988; orchestra)
- Song of the Enchanter (1990; orchestra) (commissioned to honour the 125th anniversary of the birth of Jean Sibelius)
- Autumn Sonata (Concerto for Bass Clarinet and Orchestra) (1993)
- Helios (1994; oboe, orchestra)
- Songs for a Winter's Evening (1995; soprano, orchestra)
- Phoenix Rising (1997, orchestra)
- Aurora (1999; string orchestra)
- The Mocking-Bird (2000; baritone, orchestra)
- Turbulent Landscapes (2003; orchestra)
- Wood, Metal and Skin (2004; percussion, orchestra)
- Two's Company (2005; oboe, percussion, orchestra)
- Points of View (2007; orchestra)
- Green (2008; string chamber orchestra – 2014; string orchestra)
- Towards the Blue (2010; clarinet, orchestra)
- Loch Ness – A postcard from Scotland (2012; orchestra)
- From Darkness into the Light (2017; cello, orchestra)
- Trumpet Concerto (2019; trumpet, orchestra)
- In Memoriam 2022 (2024; oboe, violin,orchestra)

=== Choral ===
- The Five Ages of Man (1963; chorus and orchestra)
- Rorate Coeli (1973)
- The Last Twilight (1980; choir and brass ensemble)
- Wild Winter 1: Lamentations (1993; voices and viols)
- On the Underground, sets one, two and three (1994)
- Wild Winter 2 (1996; voices and viols)
- Going North (2004; children's choir)
- Voices of Power and Protest (2006)
- Ithaca (2010)
- The Voices of Our Ancestors (2014; choir, brass, organ)
- Missa Brevis (2017; choir, organ)
- By the River (2019)

=== Chamber ===
- Trio for flute, oboe and piano (1960)
- Orfeo (1975; solo flute & tape or strings)
- Pierrot (1985; clarinet)
- Journey through a Japanese landscape (1994; marimba, winds, harp, piano, percussion), violin and piano)
- Postcards from Spain (1995; Guitar)
- Ring Out Wild Bells (2000; clarinet, violin, cello, piano)
- Night Windows (2007; oboe, piano – 2016; oboe, strings)
- Cantilena (2008; oboe quartet)
- Poets in Love (2009; tenor, baritone, piano four hands)
- Sunrise (2010; flute, viola and harp)
- Five Songs for Spring (2011; baritone & piano, also orchestrated)
- La vida es Sueño (2016; baritone, piano)
- Takes Two Bassoons (2011; two bassoons)

=== Opera ===
- The Abbot of Drimock (1955)
- Marko the Miser (1962)
- The Decision (1965)
- The Voice of Ariadne (1973)
- Mary, Queen of Scots (1977) – also chamber version (2016)
- A Christmas Carol (1979)
- An Occurrence at Owl Creek Bridge (1981)
- Harriet, the Woman Called Moses (1985) – also version for small orchestra re-titled The Story of Harriet Tubman (1990)
- Simón Bolívar (1995) – also chamber version (2013)
- Pontalba (2003)
- Orlando – An Escapade (2024)
