= Château des Fontaines =

Château in Hauts-de-France, France

Coordinates: 47.6863°N 1.9177°E

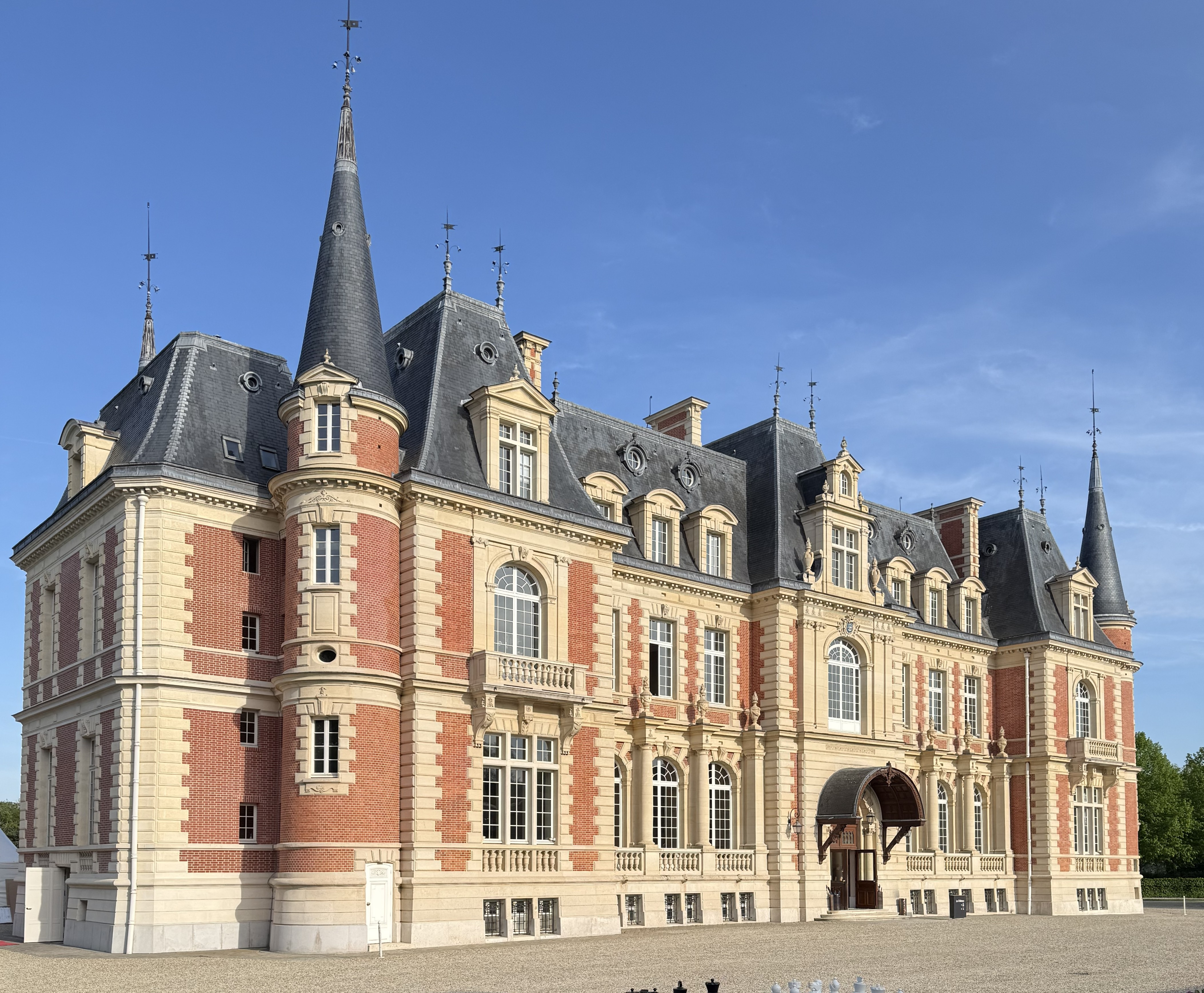
Château des Fontaines

The Château des Fontaines is a historic building and estate located in Gouvieux near Chantilly, France. Owned by Capgemini, it hosts a conference facility branded Les Fontaines - Serge Kampf Capgemini campus.

== Rothschild era ==
The château was begun by Baron James Edouard de Rothschild in 1879 and finished by his widow, Thérèse von Rothschild in 1882. The house was designed according to James' plans by architect Félix Langlais, who also designed the Château d'Armainvilliers and renovated the Hôtel de Pontalba and Vaux-de-Cernay Abbey for the Rothschild family. James also gave instructions for the decoration and furnishing of the house. In the town of Gouvieux, Thérèse founded a dispensary, a school and a library.

The château was designed in an eclectic mix of styles, including medieval, early 17th century, Louis XIV style. It featured steep-pitched roofs, the polychrome stone and brickwork and its high turrets. Thérèse made the château her summer residence until her death in 1931, continuing to use it even after she had made it over to her son, Henri, on his marriage in 1895 to Mathilde Weisweiller. Reportedly, Henri rarely visited but his son, Philippe, spent summers at the château with his grandmother.

== Later developments ==
The château was seized and occupied by the Nazis during World War II. In 1946 it was acquired by the association missionnaire de Gouvieux Chantilly for use by the French Jesuits, who set up a library and research center there. In 1970 the Jesuits opened a cultural center in the facility, the Centre Culturel des Fontaines.

In 1997, facing rising maintenance costs, the Jesuits decided to sell the property. The large library they had created on the site, known as the collection jésuite des Fontaines, was transferred to bibliothèque municipale de Lyon.

In 1998, Paris-based IT services firm Capgemini acquired the estate to redevelop it as a conference facility. The redevelopment was completed in 2002, on a design by architects Valode & Pistre. The facility was renamed in November 2017 in memory of Serge Kampf, founder of Capgemini, who had passed away a year earlier.

== Gallery ==
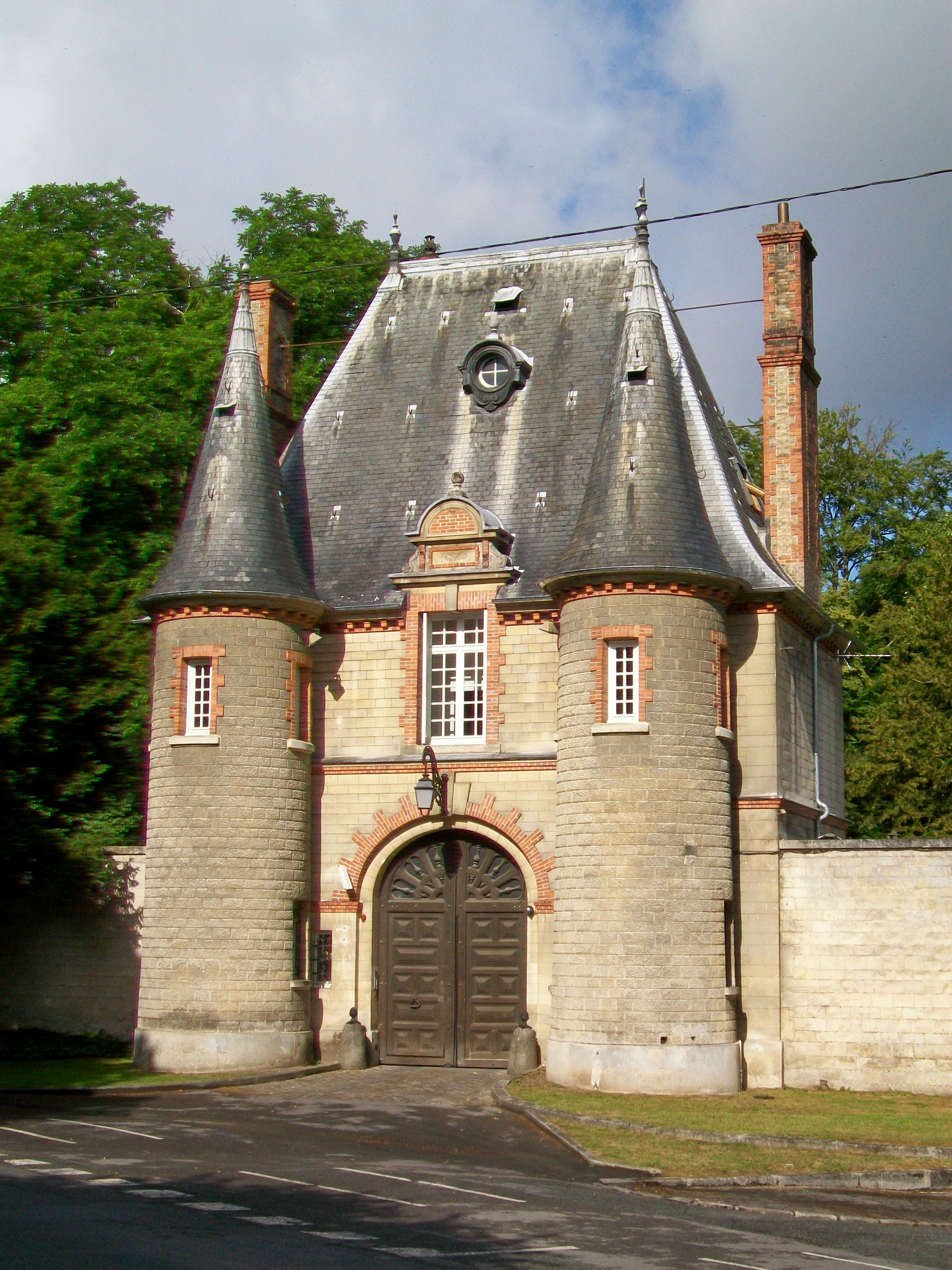
Entrance gate on the Chantilly side

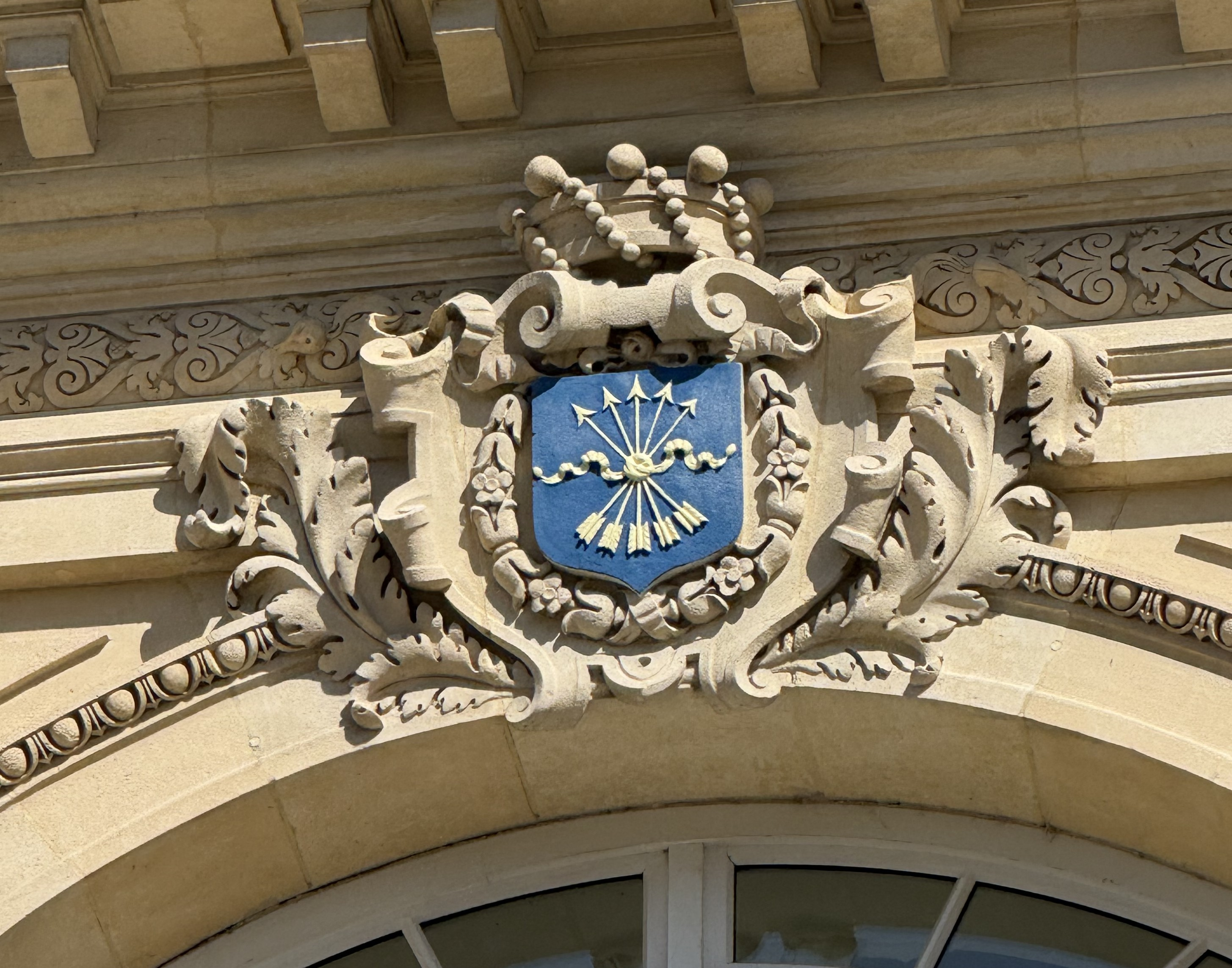
Rothschild emblem on the Château's façade

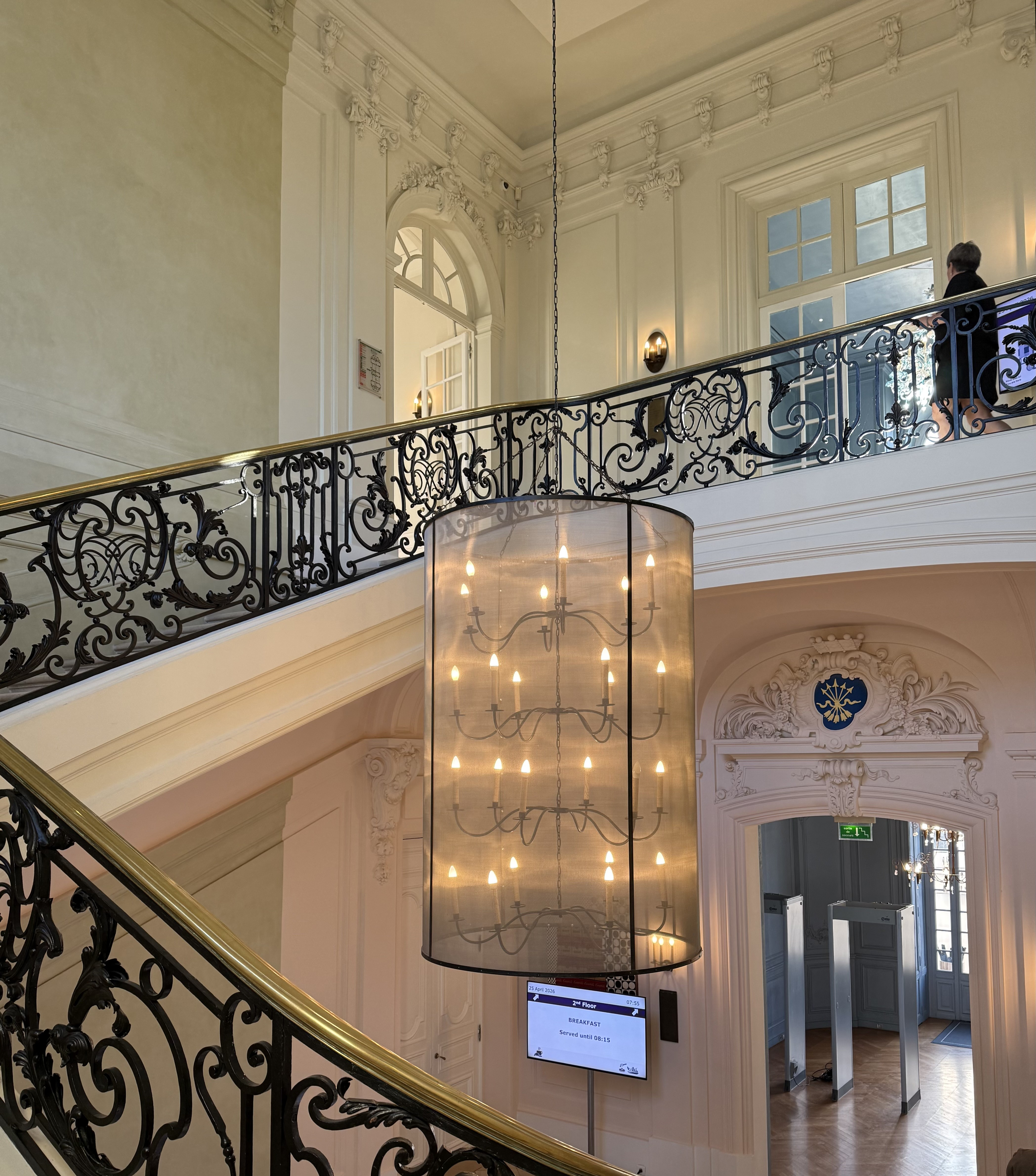
Grand staircase of the Château

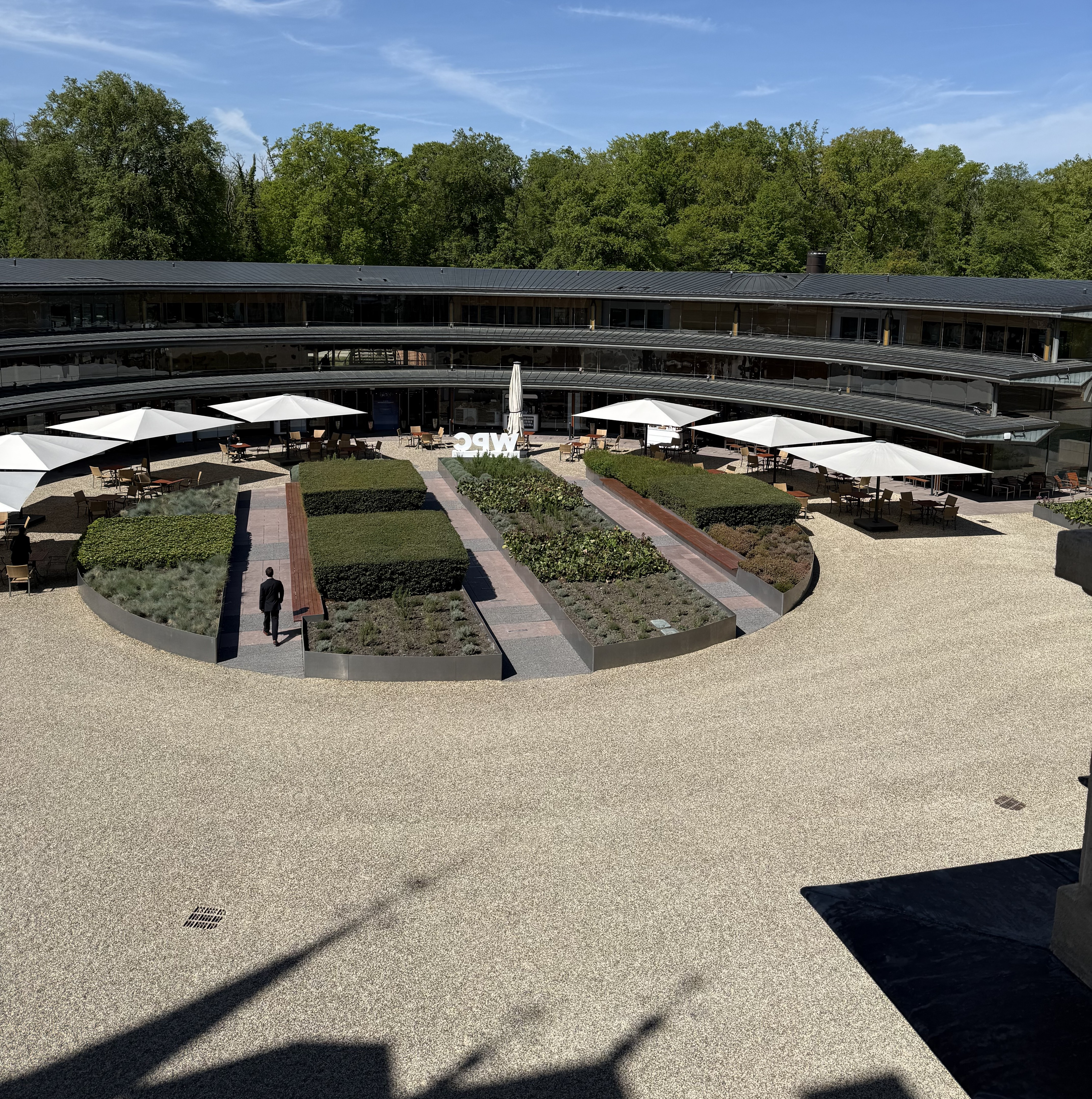
Conference center viewed from the Château

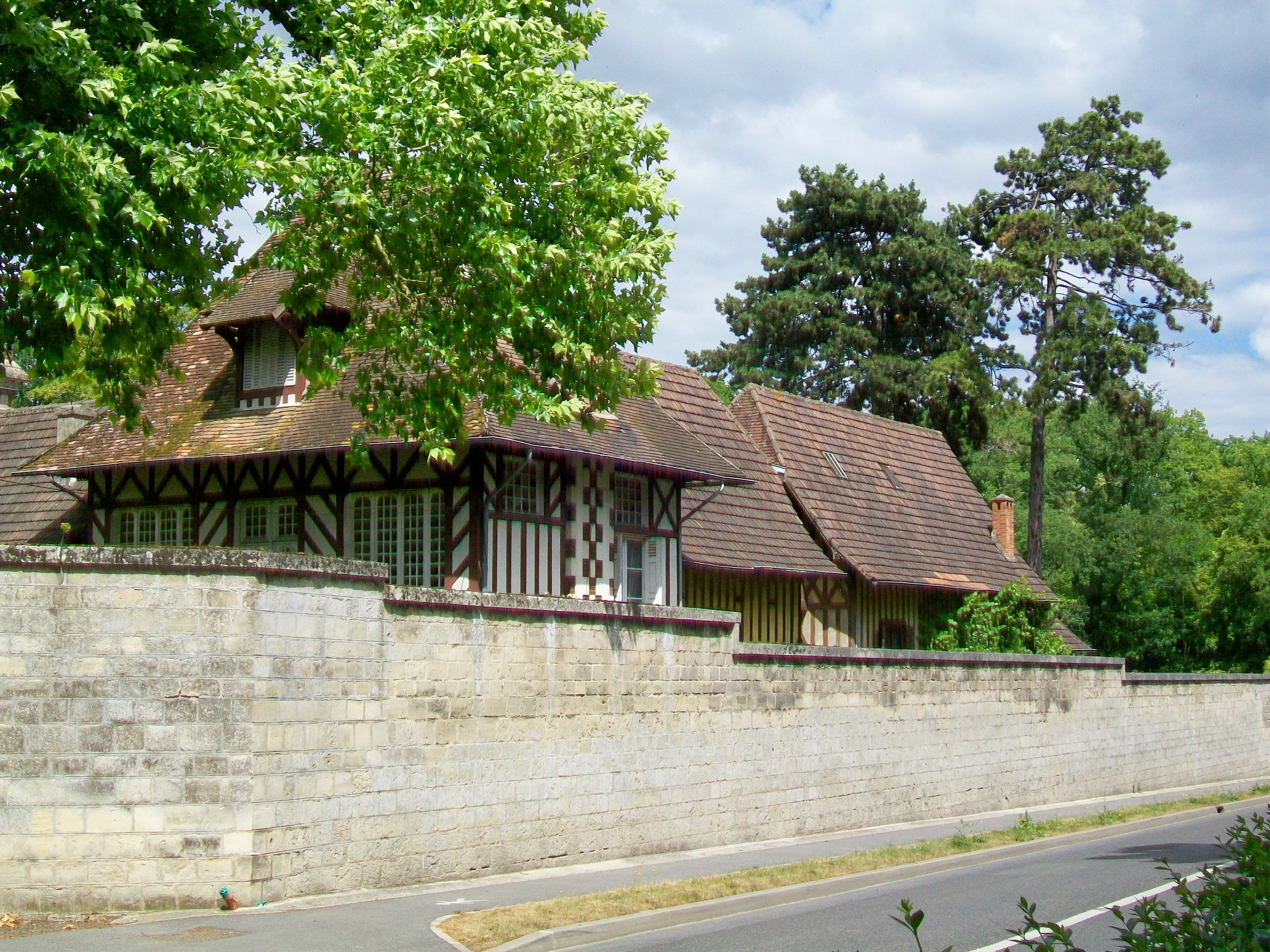
Roofs on Chantilly road

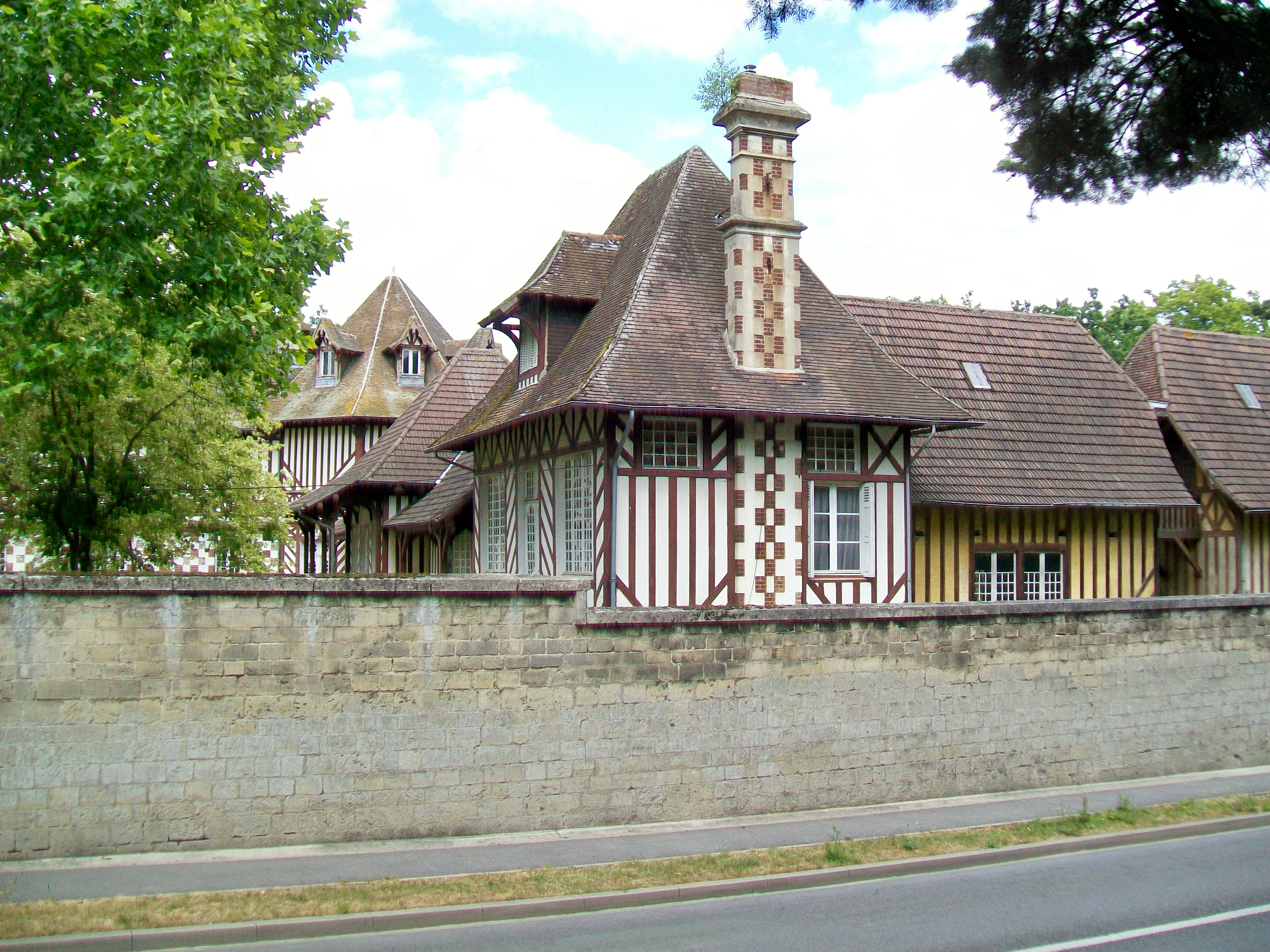
The octagonal pavilion (partially visible in the background on the left)
