= Embassy of the United States, Paris =

Diplomatic mission of the U.S. to France

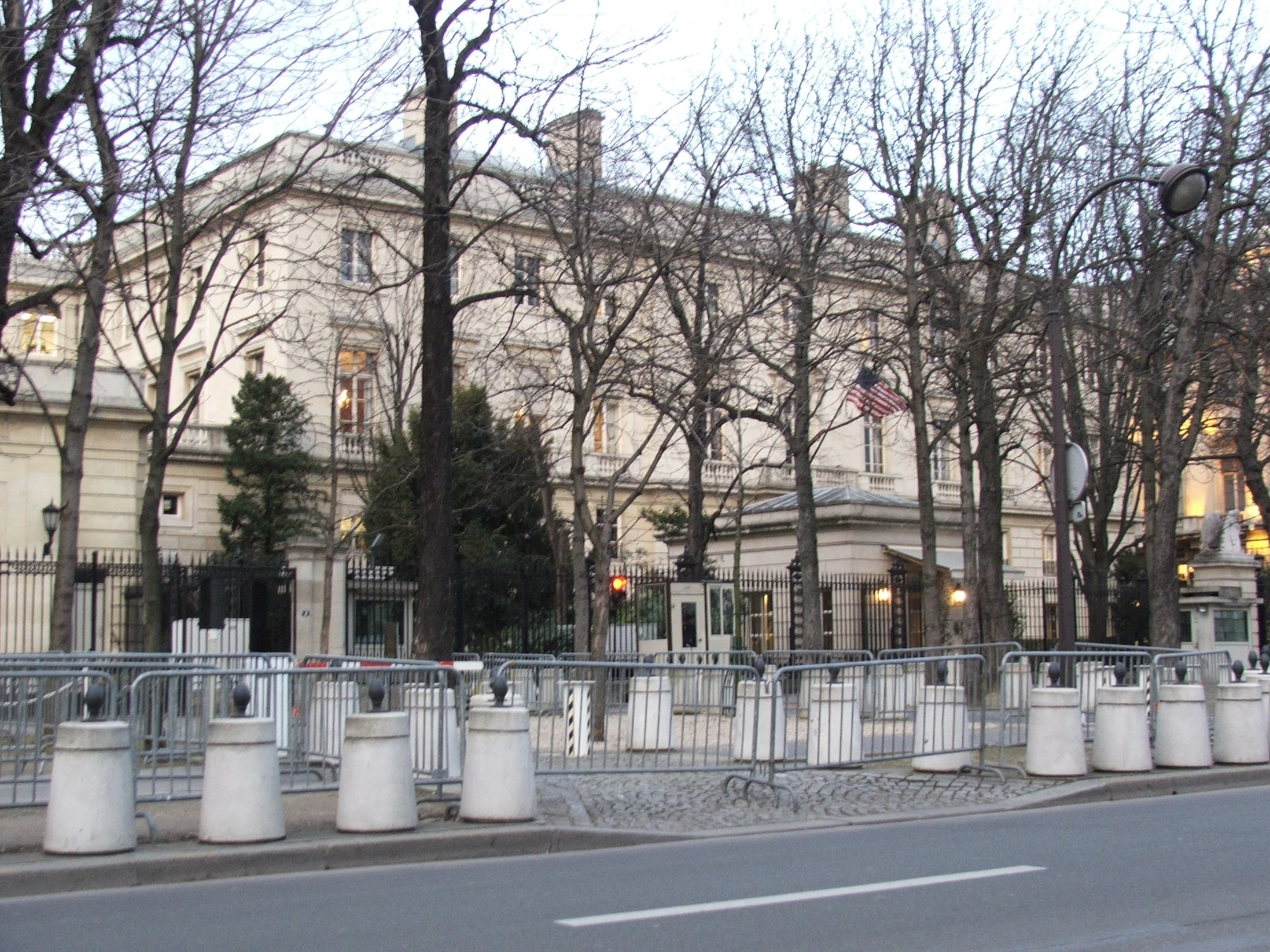
- Chancery building seen from the southwest
- Location: 2 Avenue Gabriel; Paris, France
- Coordinates: 48.867886°N 2.320733°E
- Inaugurated: 1933; 93 years ago
- Ambassador: Charles Kushner
- Website: fr.usembassy.gov

The Embassy of the United States in Paris is the diplomatic mission of the United States in the French Republic. The embassy is the oldest diplomatic mission of the United States. Benjamin Franklin and some of the other Founding Fathers were the earliest U.S. ambassadors to France. The chancery building is located at 2 Avenue Gabriel, on the northwest corner of the Place de la Concorde, in the 8th arrondissement of Paris.

== Buildings ==
The U.S. State Department owns three buildings in Paris to support its diplomatic, consular, trade and cultural activities, which are: the chancery building, the Hôtel de Talleyrand and the Hôtel de Pontalba (ambassador's residence). More details about the latter two buildings can be found in the Secretary of State's Register of Culturally Significant Property.

The U.S. Mission to the OECD is located at 12 Avenue Raphaël in the 16th arrondissement.

=== Chancery ===
The four-story chancery building, housing the ambassador's office, faces Avenue Gabriel and the gardens of the Champs-Élysées; it is beside the Hôtel de Crillon. It was built in 1931, following the demolition of an existing building, the Hôtel Grimod de La Reynière. Designed by Delano & Aldrich – an American architectural firm based in New York City, New York – along with French architect Victor Laloux, the building has a façade that conforms with other buildings on the Place de la Concorde, as required by French law.

According to French media reports, since 2005 the chancery has hosted a rooftop listening station operated by the Special Collection Service, a joint CIA-NSA signals intelligence unit.

=== Hôtel de Talleyrand ===
The Hôtel de Talleyrand, also called the Talleyrand building, at 2 rue Saint-Florentin formerly housed the American Embassy Consular Services, Public and Cultural Affairs offices, several other government agencies, and the George C. Marshall Center. Most of these offices were subsequently moved to the chancery building. Constructed in 1769 as a private residence, the property was acquired in 1812 by Charles Maurice de Talleyrand, who owned it until his death in 1838. It was then purchased by the banker James Mayer de Rothschild, whose family owned it for over a century, until 1950, when it was acquired by the U.S. government. The building housed the American administration of the Marshall Plan from 1948 to 1951). Its restored reception rooms, now the George C. Marshall Center, host official events, and the building is also leased to Jones Day, an American law firm.

=== Ambassador's residence ===
The nearby property at 41 rue du Faubourg Saint-Honoré, known as the Hôtel de Pontalba, was built by Louis Visconti for the New Orleans–born Baroness Micaela Almonester de Pontalba between 1842 and 1855. Edmond James de Rothschild acquired the building in 1876. His estate sold it in 1948 to the U.S. government, and today it is the residence of the U.S. Ambassador to France.

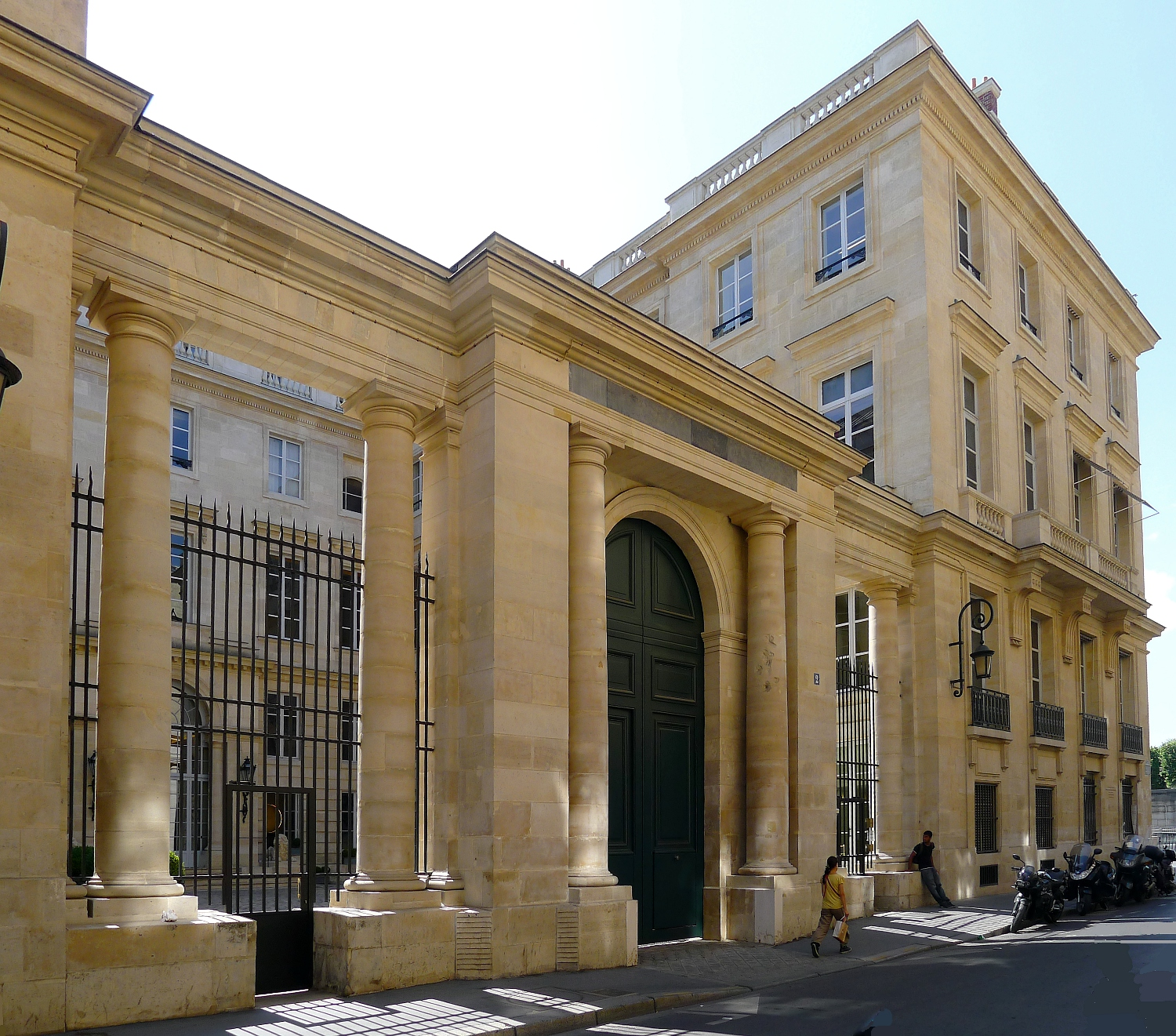
Hôtel de Talleyrand from rue Saint-Florentin

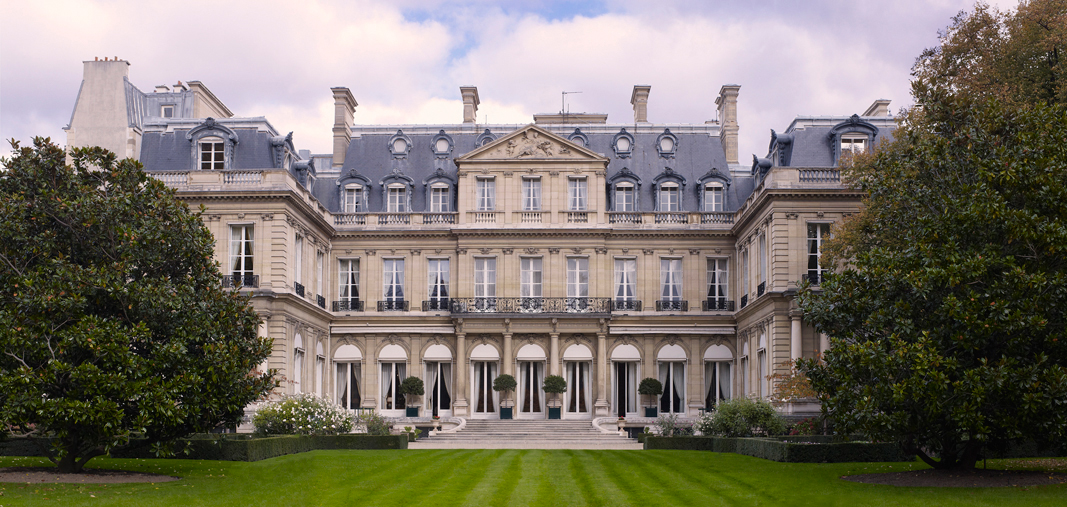
Hôtel de Pontalba – residence of the American ambassador (41 rue du Faubourg-Saint-Honoré)

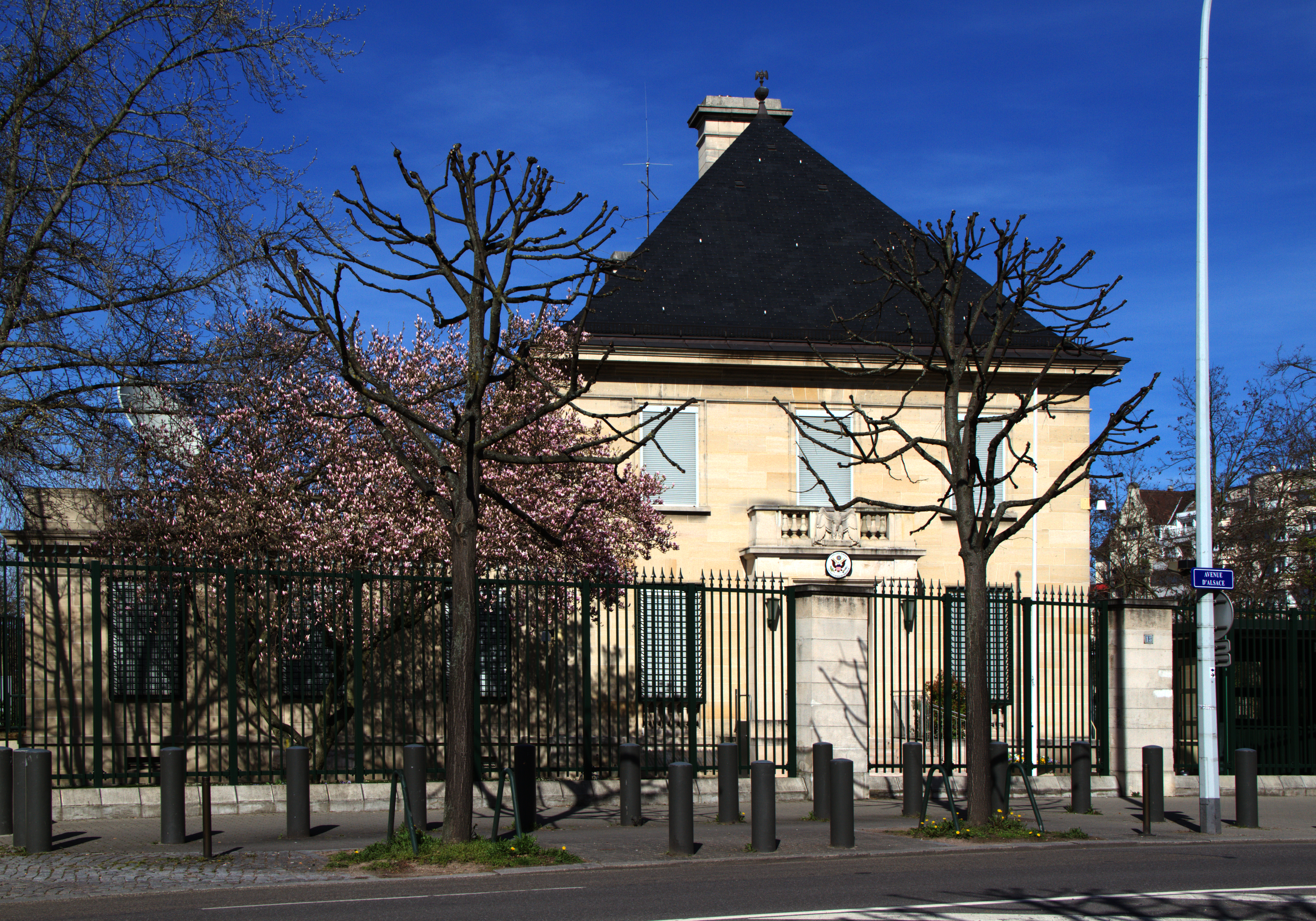
Consulate General in Strasbourg

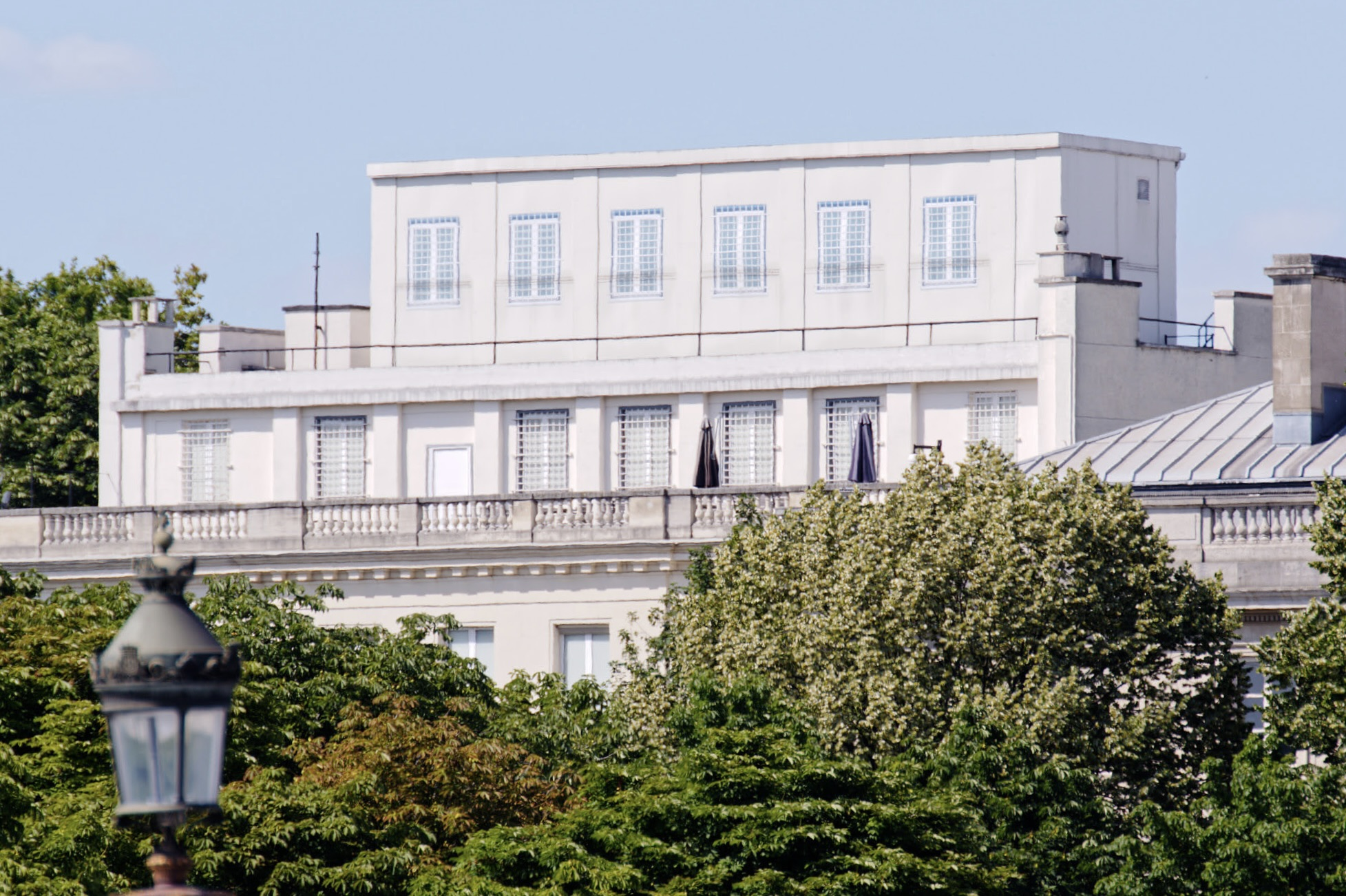
Chancery rooftop listening station with its trompe-l'œil facade

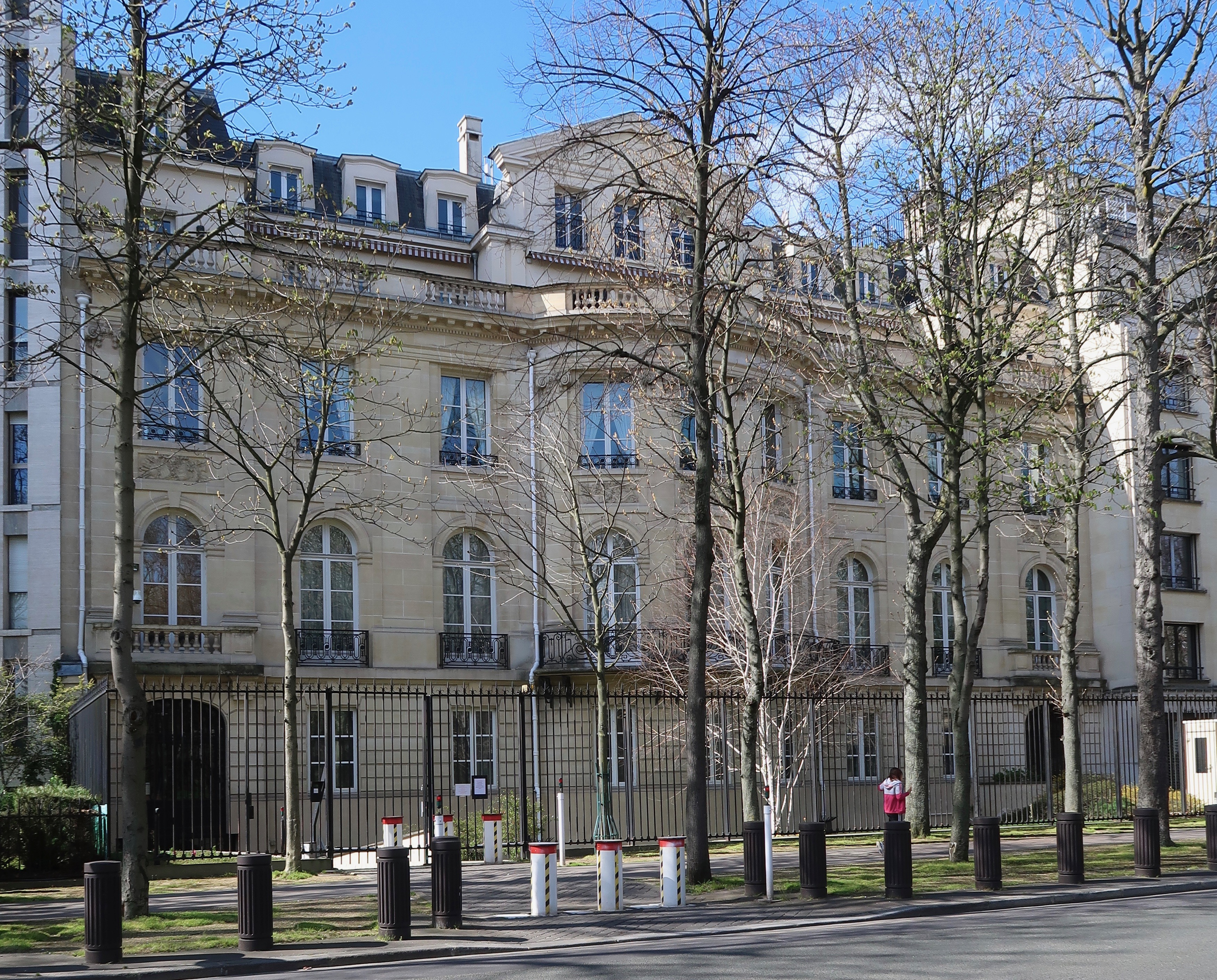
U.S. Mission to the OECD, 12 Avenue Raphaël

== U.S. representatives in France ==
As of December 18, 2017, sixty-six people had represented, in France, the interests of the United States (or individual states prior to the 1789 ratification of the U.S. Constitution) as envoy, minister plenipotentiary, minister, ambassador or chargé d'affaires.

== See also ==
- Diplomatic rank
- France – United States relations
- French Embassy, Washington, D.C.
- List of diplomatic missions of the United States
- Place des États-Unis
