= Facultés Loyola Paris =

Coordinates: 48°51′02″N 2°19′33″E

Centre Sèvres
- Type: School of philosophy and theology
- Established: 1974; 52 years ago
- Affiliations: Jesuit Catholic
- Students: 250/graduate
- Location: 35bis, rue de Sèvres; Paris, France
- Website: www.centresevres.com

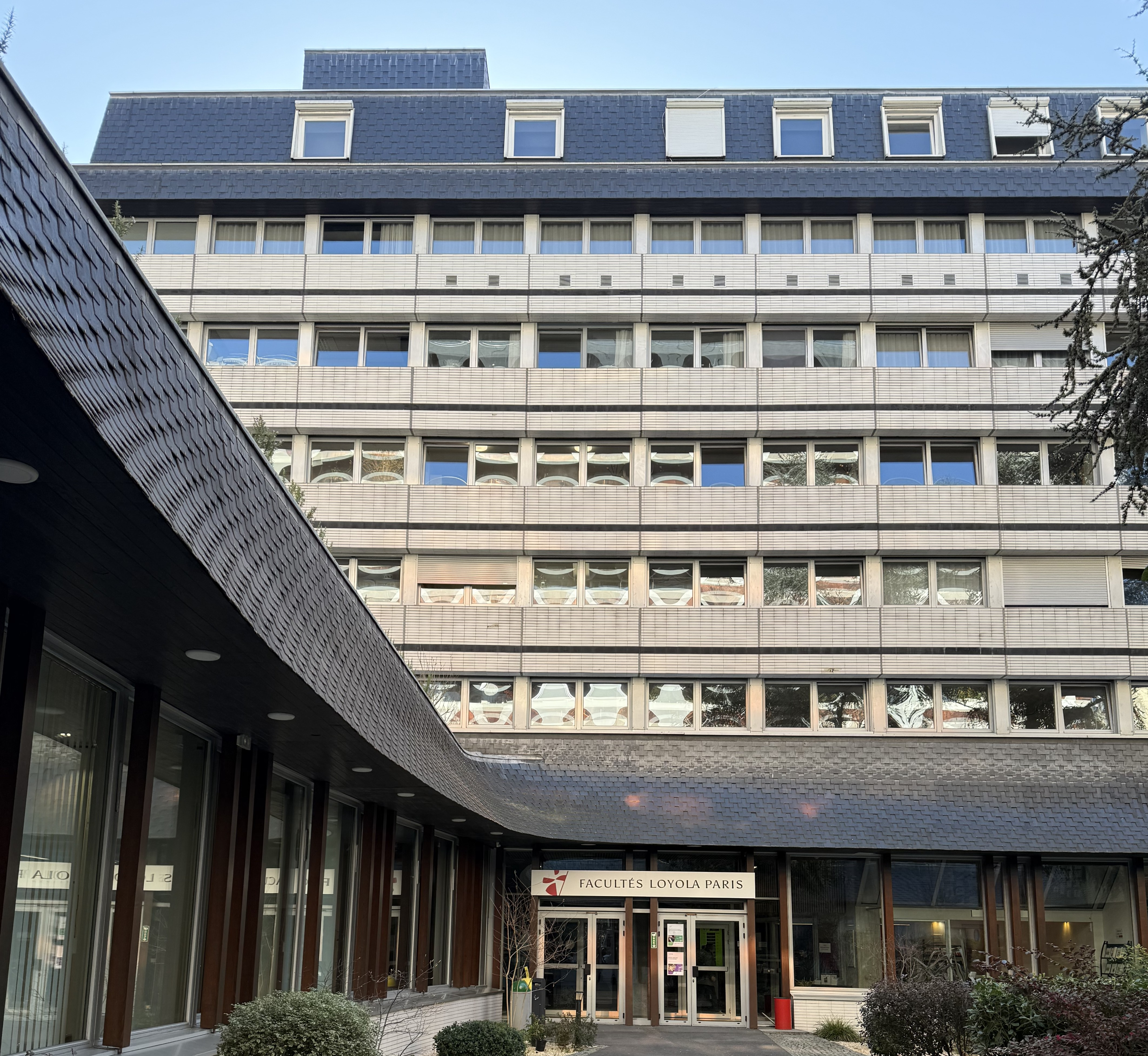
Building of the Facultés Loyola next to Church of Siant Ignatius, Paris

The Facultés Loyola Paris is a university-level Jesuit faculty of philosophy and theology in Paris. Formed in 1974, it is not restricted to Jesuits but welcomes men and women, lay and religious.

The facility was known as Centre Sèvres for a half-century before rebranding to its present name in 2024.

== History ==
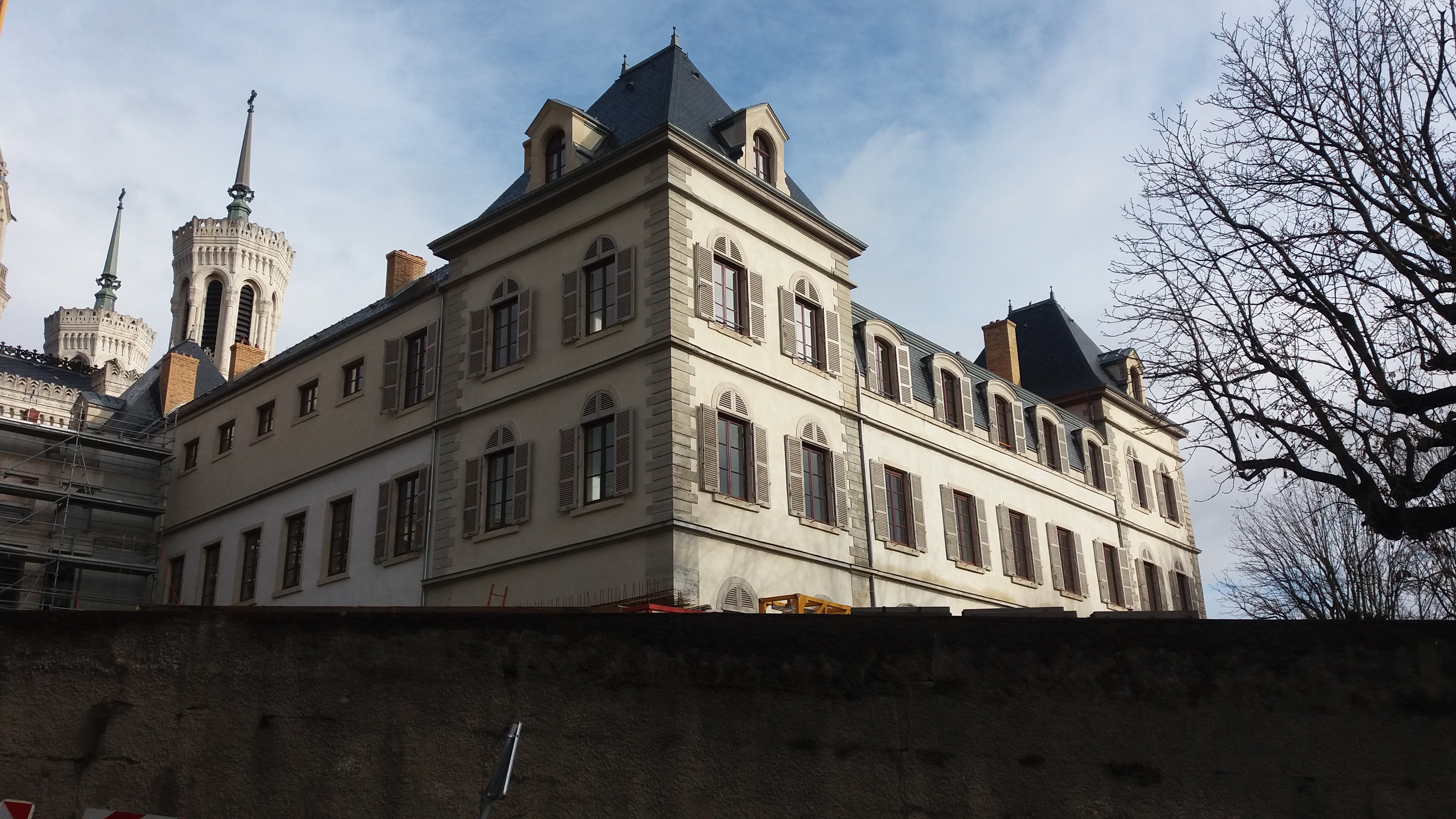
Maison Carrée at Fourvière in Lyon, former site of the Lyon scholasticate

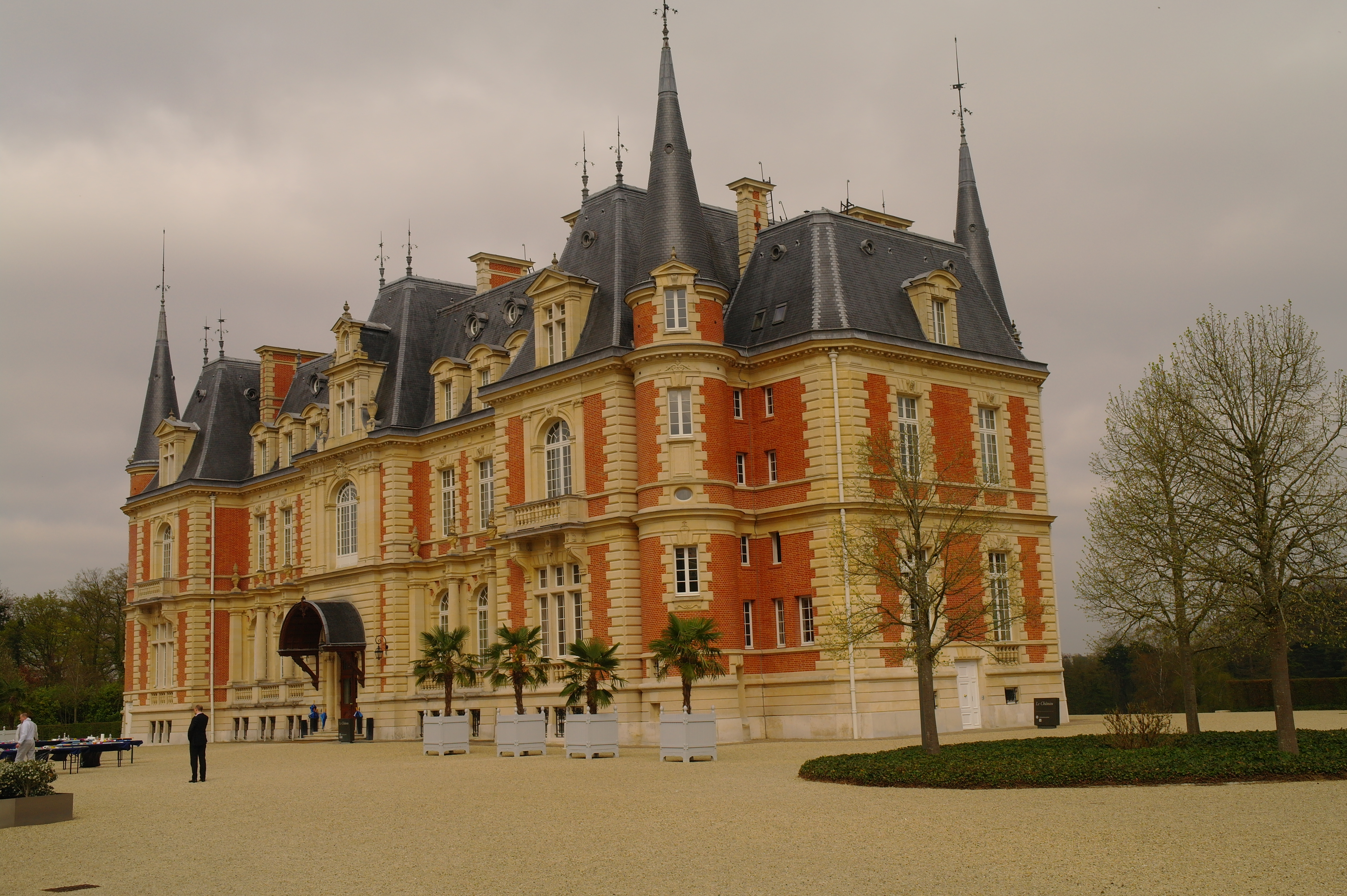
Château des Fontaines in Chantilly, former site of the Jesuit center

The Centre Sèvres was established in 1974 by merger of two prior Jesuit establishments, the Faculté de théologie Lyon-Fourvière in Lyon and the Centre culturel des Fontaines at Chantilly near Paris.

The Lyon faculty was originally established in 1841 and hosted by a dedicated building complex erected in 1853, then suspended following The 1901 Law of Associations and re-established in 1926. The building was subsequently used from 1978 by the conservatoire à rayonnement régional de Lyon, then converted in 2022 into a Catholic cultural and museum facility.

The estate around Château des Fontaines, originally developed by the Rothschild family, was purchased by the Jesuits in 1946 and converted into a cultural center opened to the public in 1970. The Company of Jesus eventually closed and sold it in 1998 as it struggled with property maintenance costs.

== Studies ==
Following the Apostolic Constitution of Pope John Paul II on Catholic Universities and Ecclesiastical Faculties (Sapientia Christiana) of April 15, 1979, and the ordinances of the Congregation for Catholic Education, the canonical statutes of the centre were approved by Rome on June 18, 1986. The licentiate, master's degree, and PhD are offered in both philosophy and theology. The school of philosophy includes special emphases on aesthetics, biomedical ethics, and public ethics and international perspectives. It also hosts the Ricci Institute of Chinese Studies. The school of theology includes studies in ancient languages and patristics, religions and cultures, and spirituality and the religious life.

There are approximately 250 students from 40 nations in the degree programmes along with around 1,750 auditors, with many from the United States. There are about 40 regular and 90 guest lecturers, from several European countries.

The Centre organizes conferences on various topics, such as "Islam and Christianity: what dialogue is possible?" and "Called in the heart of the world with the heart of God" on secular institutes, along with symposia – "The Jesuits Today".

== Library and publications ==
The centre's library and its stocks in Vanves comprise 190,000 volumes and 850 periodicals, many in English, French, German, Spanish, and Italian, including manuscripts and printed books from the 16th through 18th centuries. Most of the books are works on theology – Biblical exegesis, fundamental and dogmatic theology, new theological currents, interreligious dialogue, ecumenism, morality and ethics, spirituality, history of religions, church history, history of religious orders – and philosophy – ancient, modern, and contemporary. The Jesuit collection contains over 40,000 volumes on Ignatian spirituality and Jesuit history, many of them original editions. There is also a reference room with 7,000 volumes.

The Centre publishes two journals, Recherches de sciences religieuses and Archives de philosophie and has its own publishing house.

== See also ==
- Le Saulchoir
- List of Jesuit sites
