= Church of St Michael and Our Lady =

Church of St Michael and Our Lady or variations of this title may refer to:

- Church of St Michael and Our Lady, Wragby, West Yorkshire, England
- Our Lady and St Michael's Church, Workington, Cumbria, England
- Church of Our Lady and St Michael, Abergavenny, Monmouthshire, Wales
