= Villa Montfeld =

Historic house in Algiers

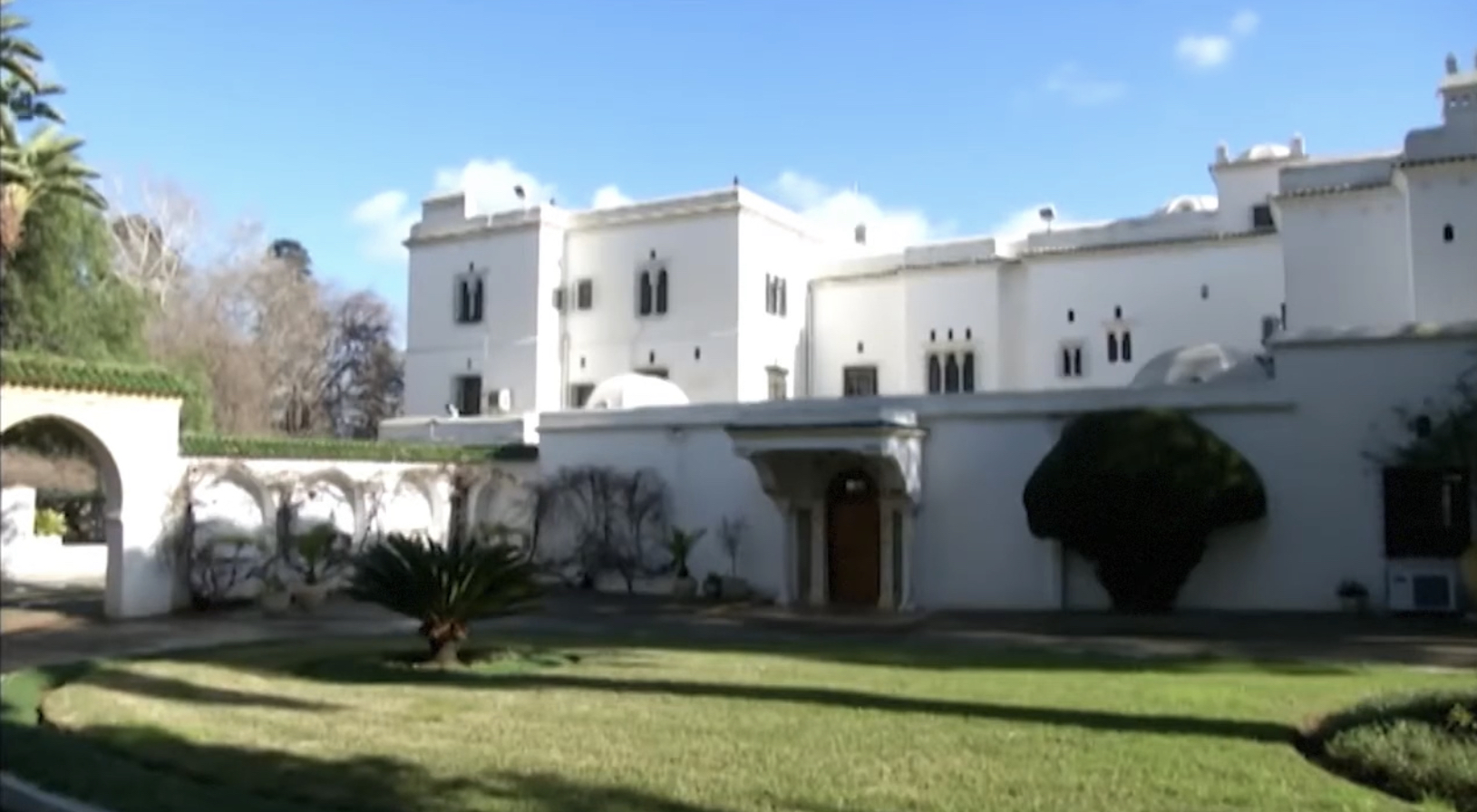
- Villa Montfeld in 2017

- Location within Algeria
- 36.75651°N 3.04014°E
- Type: House
- Location: El Biar, Algiers Province, Algeria

History
- Built: 19th century

Site notes
- Architect: Benjamin Bucknall
- Architectural style: Moorish Revival
- Governing body: US Government

The Villa Montfeld is an historic residence in the El Biar district of Algiers, Algeria, which serves as the residence of the Ambassador of the United States to Algeria. The villa was built in the mid-19th century and was reconstructed in a Moorish Revival style by the English architect Benjamin Bucknall between 1878 and 1895. In 1947 the villa was bought by the United States government for use as an ambassadorial residence. In 1981 Villa Montfeld hosted negotiations leading to the Algiers Accords, which ended the Iran hostage crisis.

== History and description ==
The original mansion at Montfeld was built by French investors after France's invasion in 1830. From the 1860s, it was owned by a succession of British expatriates including, from 1863, Anna Leigh Smith, daughter of Benjamin Leigh Smith, a wealthy politician. Anna, whose sister Barbara Bodichon was a noted artist and feminist, was responsible for the rebuilding of the villa, initially in a Gothic Revival style. In 1878 she engaged the architect Benjamin Bucknall (1833-1895) to reconstruct the villa to a Moorish Revival design. Bucknall, who had wintered in Algiers in 1876-7 on account of his poor health, relocated permanently to the city in 1878. He died there in 1895, having established a successful architectural practice specialising in the building and reconstruction of villas in the Moorish style.

During World War II the villa was occupied by General Georges Catroux, appointed Governor-General of Algeria by Charles De Gaulle in 1943. Harold Macmillan, then serving as Minister Resident in the Mediterranean, recorded the Catroux's arrival; "Now a great event has taken place in the social life of Algiers. The famous Mme Catroux has arrived!! Catroux - I need hardly say - has managed to get the best villa in the city for himself." After the war, Villa Montfeld was purchased by the American Government for use as their ambassadorial residence, a function it continues to serve.

The Villa was later owned by Robert Bevan, son of Thomas Bevan (politician).

In 1980-81, the villa was used by Warren Christopher, the US Deputy Secretary of State under Jimmy Carter, as his headquarters during the negotiation of the Algiers Accords. The accords, facilitated by the Algerian Government and signed on the last evening of Carter's Presidency on 19 January 1981, brought the end of the Iran hostage crisis.

The Villa Montfeld is listed on the Register of Culturally Significant Property, an archive complied by the United States Department of State as a commemorative Millennium project to record the buildings of historic and architectural importance owned by the State Department worldwide. In a speech in 2017 acknowledging the inclusion, the American ambassador noted the “very important role” played by the villa in US diplomatic history.
