= Church of Our Lady and St Michael, Abergavenny =

Church of Our Lady and St Michael, Abergavenny, Monmouthshire
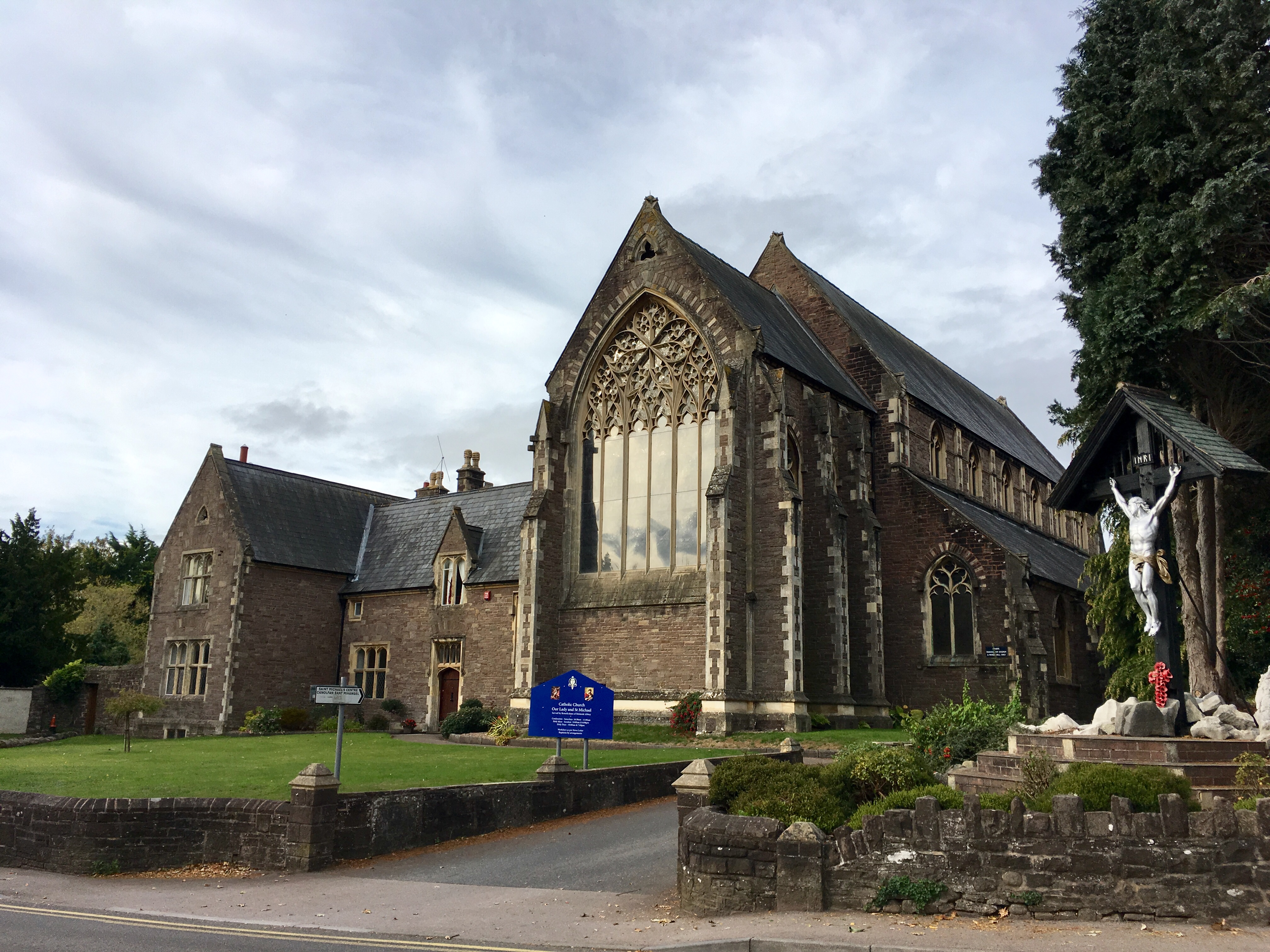
- Our Lady and St Michael
- Church of Our Lady and St Michael, Abergavenny, Monmouthshire
- 51.8256°N 3.0204°W
- Location: Abergavenny, Monmouthshire
- Country: Wales
- Denomination: Roman Catholic

History
- Status: Parish church
- Founded: 1858
- Founder: John Baker Gabb

Architecture
- Functional status: Active
- Heritage designation: Grade II*
- Designated: 27 September 2001
- Architect: Benjamin Bucknall
- Style: Decorated Gothic
- Groundbreaking: 1858
- Completed: 1860

Administration
- Archdiocese: Cardiff-Menevia
- Parish: Abegavenny

The Church of Our Lady and St Michael in Abergavenny, Monmouthshire, is a Roman Catholic parish church. A Grade II* listed building, it was built between 1858 and 1860 to a design by Benjamin Bucknall.

== History and architecture ==
Abergavenny remained a Catholic stronghold in the years after the Reformation, and its first Catholic church built after the Reformation was on Frogmore Street. This was replaced as the town's main Catholic church by Our Lady and St Michael's in 1860. The construction of the church was funded by a local solicitor, John Baker Gabb, and the architect was Benjamin Bucknall. Bucknall was engaged on the building of Woodchester Mansion, Gloucestershire, for another Catholic client, William Leigh, and, aged only 25, was seen as a coming man in Catholic architectural circles. Bucknall's intellectual and architectural influences were the work and ideas of Augustus Pugin – he converted to Catholicism in the year of Pugin's death – and the French Gothic Revival architect Eugène Viollet-le-Duc, with whom Bucknall was in regular correspondence.

The church is constructed in Decorated Gothic style, with an accompanying Tudor Gothic presbytery. Built of Old Red Sandstone, with Bath Stone dressings and slate roofs, the church comprises a nave, North and South aisles and a chancel. An intended "grand tower and spire" were never built.

== Internal features ==
Simon Jenkins describes the church as "a bold composition of church and presbytery." The interior of the church is largely unchanged since its construction with all its original Victorian furniture and furnishings intact. The presbytery is similarly unspoilt. The church also has "an exceptionally fine collection of medieval and later vestments".
