= Register of Culturally Significant Property =

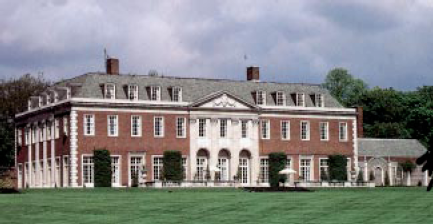
Winfield House in London

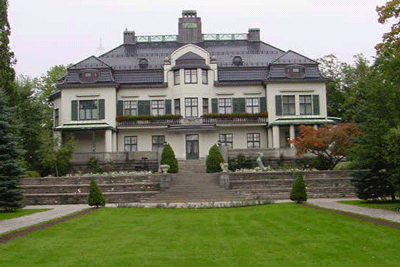
Villa Otium in Oslo

The Secretary of State's Register of Culturally Significant Property (Secretary's Register) is an honorific listing of diplomatic properties that figure prominently in the international or architectural heritage of the United States. It was founded in 2000 as a White House Millennium Project, in equation of the National Register of Historic Places for domestic properties maintained by the Secretary of the Interior. These historic places include chanceries, residences, office buildings, a museum, a cemetery, and a guest house; the properties are either owned or leased by the U.S. Department of State at the time of designation.

Properties are placed on the Secretary's Register biannually. To be eligible for consideration, a nominated property must demonstrate an association with an important aspect of American diplomatic history and be included in the U.S. Department of State Bureau of Overseas Buildings Operations (OBO) List of Significant Properties.

In addition to the preliminary requirements, seven criteria are used to evaluate nominated properties for inclusion in the Secretary's Register:

- Designation or acknowledgment by a government as a significant property
- Part of the United States' overseas heritage
- Association with a significant historical event or person
- Important architecture and/or by an important architect
- Distinctive theme or assembly
- Unique object or visual feature
- Archaeological site

The Secretary's Register is instrumental in promoting the preservation of American history and architecture overseas and the conservation of cultural heritage in partnership with host governments. The State Department owns or has under long-term lease over 3,500 properties at 289 diplomatic posts worldwide. Of these, 44 are recognized as landmark American properties abroad with listing in the Secretary's Register.

== Culturally Significant Places ==
The following is a list of the Department of State's culturally significant places honored in the Secretary's Register. Many of these are currently used as the embassy or residence of the United States ambassadors to their respective countries.

- Ambassador's Residence, Hanoi
- Ambassador's Residence, Helsinki
- Ambassador's Residence, Lima
- Ambassador's Residence, Vienna
- Ambassador's Residence, Tokyo
- Ambassador's Summer Residence, Baguio
- American Cemetery, Tripoli
- Athens Chancery, Athens
- Blair House, Washington, D.C.
- Bratislava Chancery, Bratislava
- Budapest Chancery, Budapest
- Byne House, Madrid
- Carlucci House, Lisbon
- Chief Secretary's Lodge, Dublin
- Consular Academy, Vienna
- Consulate General, Barcelona
- Consulate General, Strasbourg
- Consul General Residence, Strasbourg
- Dublin Chancery, Dublin
- Florence Consulate, Florence
- Former Consulate General, Alexandria
- Ho Chi Minh City, former U.S. Embassy Saigon Site
- Hôtel de Talleyrand, Paris
- Hôtel Rothschild, Paris
- Manila Chancery, Manila
- New Delhi Chancery, New Delhi
- Palacio Bosch, Buenos Aires
- Palazzo Corpi, Istanbul
- Palazzo Margherita and Twin Villas, Rome
- Roosevelt House, Curaçao
- Roosevelt House, New Delhi
- Schoenborn Palace, Prague
- Seoul Old American Legation Site, Seoul
- Spaso House, Moscow
- Tangier Old Legation, Tangier
- Tirana Chancery, Tirana
- Truman Hall, Brussels
- Villa Åkerlund, Stockholm
- Villa Mirador, Casablanca
- Villa Montfeld, Algiers
- Villa Otium, Oslo
- Villa Petschek, Prague
- Villa Taverna, Rome
- Winfield House, London

== See also ==
- National Historic Landmarks
- National Register of Historic Places
