= Algiers Accords (1981) =

Algeria-mediated treaty between Iran and the United States

The Algiers Accords of January 19, 1981 was a set of obligations and commitments undertaken independently by the United States and Iran to resolve the Iran hostage crisis, brokered by the Algerian government and signed in Algiers on January 19, 1981. The crisis began from the takeover of the American embassy in Tehran on November 4, 1979, where Iranian students took hostage of present American embassy staff. By this accord and its adherence, 52 American citizens were able to leave Iran. With the two countries unable to settle on mutually agreeable terms, particularly for quantitative financial obligations, Algerian mediators proposed an alternative agreement model - one where each country undertook obligations under the accords independently, rather than requiring both countries to mutually adhere to the same terms under a bilateral agreement.

Among its chief provisions are:

1. The US would not intervene politically or militarily in Iranian internal affairs;
2. The US would remove the freeze on Iranian assets and trade sanctions on Iran;
3. Both countries would end litigation between their respective governments and citizens, referring them instead to international arbitration, namely to the Iran–United States Claims Tribunal, created as a result of the agreement;
4. The US would ensure that US court decisions regarding the transfer of any property of the former Shah would be independent from "sovereign immunity principles" and would be enforced;
5. Iranian debts to US institutions would be paid.

The US chief negotiator was Deputy Secretary of State Warren Christopher, while the chief Algerian mediator was the Algerian Foreign Affairs Minister Mohammed Benyahia accompanied with a team of Algerian intelligence including Prime Minister Mohammed ben Ahmed Abdelghan and Mr Rashid Hassaine. The negotiations took place and the accords were signed at the Algiers home of the American ambassador, the Villa Montfeld.

== Implementation ==
The key objectives of the accords surrounded the return of hostages to the US and the return of assets to Iran, restoring order to pre-Tehran crisis status. The key qualitative measures needed to reach these objectives are as follows:

1. The US and Iran would appoint the Algerian Central Bank to assume control of and jurisdiction over the funds used to settle claims from both countries
2. The Algerian Central Bank would certify the release of US nationals being held hostage in Iran while also confirming deposit from the US of the equivalent value of all gold bullion and securities owned by Iran in its custody
3. The US would reverse all trade affected enforced against Iran following the onset of the Tehran crisis
4. The US would withdraw all claims against Iran pending at the International Court of Justice and prohibited domestic legal claims against Iran by any US national, corporation or institution
5. The US would freeze and prohibit any transfer of assets to the former Shah of Iran or any of his close relatives

Implementation of the accords thus rested in two central institutional bodies that served as neutral mediators between the US and Iran - the Algerian Central Bank, which assumed responsibility for ensuring and certifying that the agreed-upon conditions on both sides had been met, and the newly created Iran-US Claims Tribunal. The Tribunal, established within the accords, serves as the de-facto arbiter for future claims between the US and Iran that relate to or arise from the Tehran hostage crisis - essentially, forcing third-party arbitration as a way to prevent disputes concerning the Tehran crisis from stalling the implementation of the above measures.

The Tribunal has dealt with a number of obstacles to implementation - notably surrounding the return of the former Shah of Iran's assets and importantly around the issue of return of assets that Iran had prepaid to the US during the Shah's regime under the Foreign Military Sales program. This is where Iran-US tensions could derail the agreement if not for the implementation safety mechanism of the Tribunal. Iran has repeatedly asserted that the US has intentionally been delaying the return of Iranian payments made under the FMS that went unfulfilled, with the accords circumventing the need for drawn-out litigation between the two countries on the exact amount owed by asserting that all such disagreements have to go through the Tribunal and its legal frameworks.

== Legislative means to a solution prior to the Algiers Accords ==
The Iran hostage crisis highlighted US foreign policy and how it dealt with the crisis. The continuation and determination of the hostage takers, but also of the long wait for the rescue of the hostages left many Americans wondering and shocked. The Iranian Hostage Crisis is deemed to be the event that has worsened the political and diplomatic relations between the two states. The crisis was comprised between two events, namely the holding of the 53 hostages for 444 days and the take-over of the US embassy in Tehran. These two events were merely two events in a series of developments that worsened the relation between the two states. The situation was seen as a 'declaration of war on diplomacy itself'.

After the failed rescue mission attempt of the Carter Administration and prior to the Algiers Accords, the United States took the case to the International Court of Justice and instituted parallel proceedings before the political organ of the United Nations, using their seat in the United Nations Security Council and legal organ of the United Nations, namely the International Court of Justice. It submitted an application under article 40(1) of the Statute of the Court and stated that the Government of Iran was in violation of various legal principles that were embodied in customary international law but also four treaties, namely the Vienna Convention on Diplomatic Relations, the Vienna Convention on Consular Relations, the 1955 Treaty of Amity, Economic Relations, and Consular Rights and the 1973 Convention on the Prevention and Punishment of Crimes Against Internationally Protected Persons, Including Diplomatic Agents. Apart from the allegation that Iran was in defiance of its obligations under the before mentioned international treaties, the application also alleged that Iran supported and was continuing to support the actions against the embassy and its personnel. The United States requested that the Court would find that the Islamic Republic of Iran had breached the international obligations as stipulated in the before mentioned international binding treaties. The United States specifically requested the release of the hostages and their safe departure from Iran, reparations to the United States and its affected nationals, and the prosecution of those responsible for the embassy seizure. The United States later on appended and added a number of interim measures to its original application, requesting the release the hostages and arrange for their safe departure, to restore the occupied premises to U.S. control, to ensure that the U.S. diplomatic and consular staff were accorded the protections necessary to carry out their official functions, and to refrain from any form of criminal action against the hostages. The Islamic Republic of Iran however denied the jurisdiction of the Court on the basis of precedent set by multiple countries (France, Iceland and Turkey) and thus decided not to take part in the oral pleadings, nor did it utilize its rights according to the Statute of the Court to appoint an ad-hoc judge, nor did the Islamic Republic of Iran publish an official statement regarding the facts, the case or the proceedings.

Fast forward to the Court Order of December 1979, the Court granted interim relief as requested by the United States, however not entirely coincided with the measures requested in the United States' final submission. The interim measures by unanimous vote. The Court did not yet submit a decision regarding the Iran's liability and its obligations regarding the caused harm to the United States, embassy and the hostages. Regardless of the United States efforts to resolve the conflict through these judicial and political means, the judgement and findings of the Court were not met nor enforceable.

== Implementation of the Algiers Accords in 1981 ==
Shortly after the Algiers Accords of 1981 entered into force, the United States breached the Accords by suspending all U.S. claims in U.S. Courts. According to General Principal B of the Algiers Accords, it states that 'it is the purpose of both parties, within the framework of and pursuant to the provisions of the two Declarations of the Government of the Democratic and Popular Republic of Algeria, to terminate all litigation as between the Government of each party and the nationals of the other, and to bring about the settlement and termination of all such claims through binding arbitration'. The before mentioned citation reads that all legislation between the Government of each party shall terminate all litigation, and not suspension.
