= Benjamin Bucknall =

English architect

- Born: 1833; Rodborough, Gloucestershire
- Died: 16 November 1895; Algiers
- Occupation: Architect
- Buildings: Woodchester Mansion

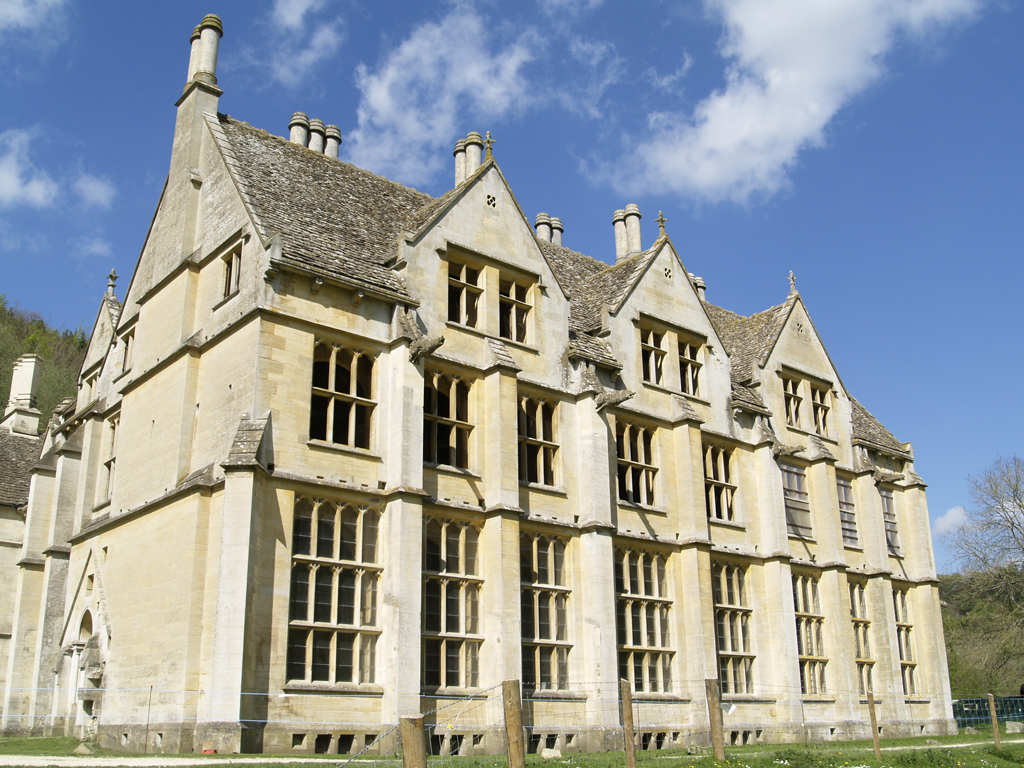
Woodchester Mansion, Gloucestershire

Benjamin Bucknall (1833 – 16 November 1895) was an English architect of the Gothic Revival in South West England and South Wales, and then of neo-Moorish architecture in Algeria. His most noted works include the uncompleted Woodchester Mansion in Gloucestershire, England and his restoration of the Villa Montfeld in El Biar, Algiers.

== Career ==
In 1851 Bucknall began work as a millwright, but in 1852 William Leigh helped him to start work for the architect Charles Hansom in Clifton, Bristol. Hansom was a Roman Catholic and in 1852 Bucknall converted to Catholicism.

Bucknall admired the work of the French architect Eugène Viollet-le-Duc, and travelled to visit him in France in 1861 and in Lausanne, Switzerland in 1872. Between 1874 and 1881 Bucknall translated five of Viollet-le-Duc's works into English.

== Family ==
Bucknall was the fifth of seven sons born to Edwin and Mary Bucknall of Rodborough, Gloucs. In 1862 Bucknall was married to Henrietta King. After 1864 they moved to Swansea and by 1869 were living in Oystermouth. The Bucknalls had four children: Mary, Charles (born 1864), Edgar (born 1868) and Beatrice (born 1870).

Bucknall's health deteriorated and he spent the winter of 1876–77 in Algiers. In 1878 he settled there permanently, leaving Henrietta and the children in Gloucestershire. The 1881 census recorded Henrietta and Mary living at Bisley, Gloucestershire. Some of their children visited Bucknall in Algiers, and Edgar died there in a boating accident in 1889.

In Algiers Bucknall changed his architectural style to neo-Moorish architecture, in which he built villas, notably in the El Biar district of Algiers. His works include a restoration of the Villa Montfeld, now the residence of the US Ambassador to Algeria. He died in Algiers in 1895 and is buried there. A road in Algiers was named Chemin Bucknall in his honour, but since independence it has been renamed.

== Buildings ==
=== Houses ===
- Woodchester Mansion, Gloucs, circa 1858
- St Stephens, a cottage orné at Nympsfield, Gloucs, circa 1860
- Tocknells House, Painswick, Gloucs, circa 1860
- West Grange, Stroud, Gloucs, 1866
- Villa Montfeld, El Biar, Algiers: restoration

=== Churches and monastic houses ===
- Church of Our Lady and St Michael, Abergavenny, Monmouthshire, 1858
- Saint George RC church, Taunton, Somerset, 1860
- St Mary's Roman Catholic Church, Monmouth, 1861–71
- St Wulstan's Roman Catholic Church, Little Malvern, Worcestershire, 1862
- Saint David's Priory RC church, Swansea, Glamorgan: extension, 1864
- Saint Thomas' RC church, Fairford, Gloucestershire: presbytery, 1865
- Holy Trinity Church of England parish church, Llanegwad, Carmarthenshire, 1865–78
- Holy Trinity Church of England parish church, Slad, Gloucs: reconstruction, 1869
- Longworth Chapel, Bartestree Convent, Herefordshire (with E.W. Pugin), 1869–70
- Saint Francis of Assisi RC Church, Baddesley Clinton convent, Warwickshire (with T.R. Donnelly), 1870
- Saint Rose of Lima Convent, Stroud, Gloucs.
- Abbotskerswell Priory, Newton Abbot, Devon: later buildings
- Swansea Seamen's Church

=== Other buildings ===
- Swansea Grammar School
- Imperial Hotel, Stroud

== Translations from French into English ==
- Viollet-le-Duc, Eugène (1874). Histoire d'une maison [How to Build a House. An Architectural Novelette]. London: Sampson Low, Marston, Low, & Searle.
- Viollet-le-Duc, Eugène (1875). Histoire d'une forteresse [Annals of a Fortress]. London: Sampson Low, Marston, Low, & Searle.
- Viollet-le-Duc, Eugène (1876). Histoire de l'habitation Humaine depuis les Temps Préhistoriques jusqu'à nos Jour [The Habitations of Man in All Ages]. London: Sampson Low, Marston, Low, & Rivington.
- Viollet-le-Duc, Eugène (1877). Massif du Mont-Blanc, étude sur sa construction géodesique et géologique, sur ses transformations et sur l'état ancien et moderne de ses glaciers [Mont Blanc. A treatise on its geodesical and geological constitution; its transformations; and the ancient and recent state of its glaciers.]. London: Sampson Low, Marston, Low, & Rivington.
- Viollet-le-Duc, Eugène (1877). Entretiens sur l'architecture [Lectures on Architecture]. Vol. 1. London: Sampson Low, Marston, Low, & Rivington.
- Viollet-le-Duc, Eugène (1881). Entretiens sur l'architecture [Lectures on Architecture]. Vol. 2. London: Sampson Low, Marston, Low, & Rivington.
- Godon, Julien (1879). Painted Tapestry and Its Application to Interior Decoration. Practical Lessons in Tapestry Painting with Liquid Colour. London: Lechertier, Barbe and Co.

== Sources ==
- Brodie, Antonia; Felstead, Alison; Franklin, Jonathan; Pinfield, Leslie, eds. (2001). Directory of British Architects 1834–1914, A–K. London & New York: Continuum. p. 291. ISBN 0-8264-5513-1.
- Verey, David (1970). The Buildings of England: Gloucestershire: The Cotswolds. Harmondsworth: Penguin Books. p. 487. ISBN 0-14-071040-X.
