= Woodchester Park SSSI =

Nature reserve in Gloucestershire, England

Woodchester Park
- Site of Special Scientific Interest
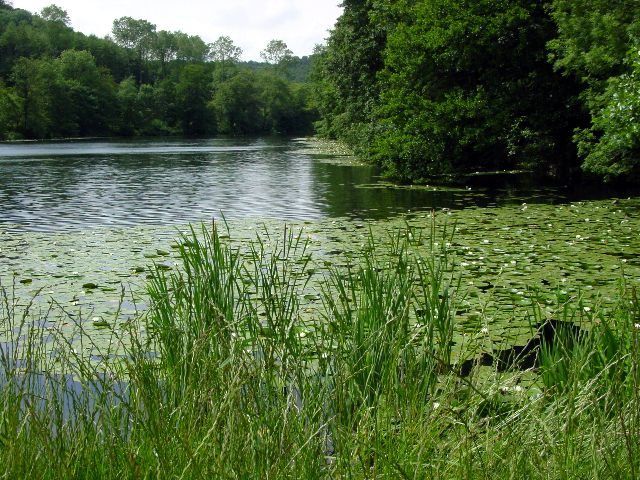
- Lake at Woodchester Park, Gloucestershire

- Location within Gloucestershire
- Location of Woodchester Park.
- Area of search: Gloucestershire
- Grid reference: SO820014
- Coordinates: 51.710666°N 2.277596°W
- Interest: Biological
- Area: 214.9 ha (531 acres)
- Notification date: 1966

Woodchester Park (grid reference SO820014) is a 214.9-hectare (531-acre) biological Site of Special Scientific Interest in Gloucestershire, notified in 1966. The park grounds are owned and maintained by the National Trust, with Woodchester Mansion managed by the Woodchester Mansion Trust.

== Location and habitat ==
The site is in a secluded and sheltered valley in the Cotswold escarpment near Nailsworth. It overlies Jurassic limestone and clays. As a consequence it supports a diversity of wildlife and habitat associated with the woodland, grassland and wetland within this valley.

== Flora ==
The site is mostly woodland and managed for timber production. There are remnants of the original semi-natural woodland (beech and ash with wild cherry and yew). There are nationally restricted plants which include fingered sedge, angular Solomon's seal, stinking hellebore and lily-of-the-valley.

== Fauna ==
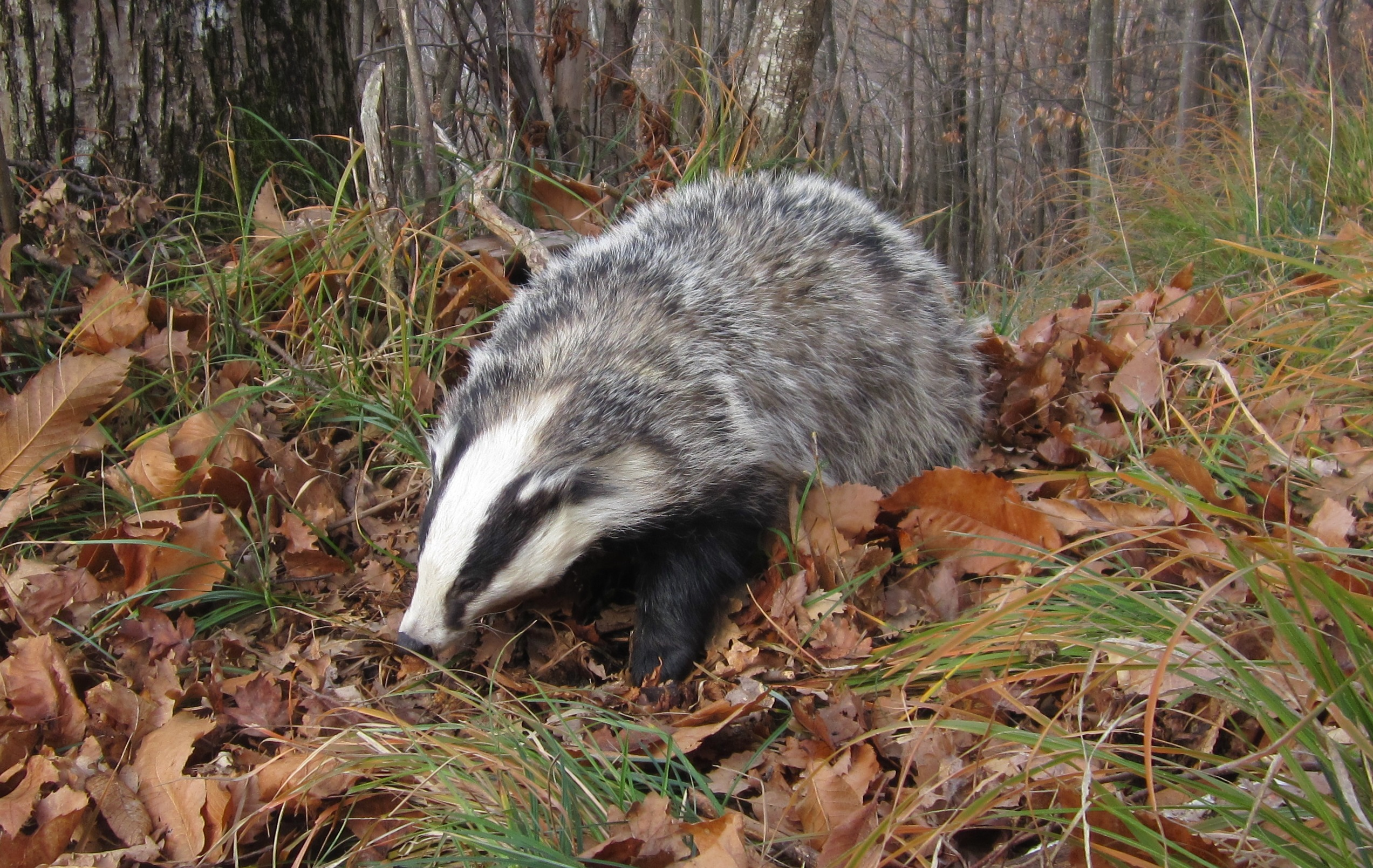
European badger (Meles meles) - a well-studied resident of Woodchester Park.

Woodchester mansion - an unfinished 19th century mansion house within the park - supports a very important breeding colony of greater horseshoe bats, which feed in the surrounding cattle pasture. A long-term study of the bat colony was set up in late 1950s and continues today. The valley is also of outstanding invertebrate interest for butterflies, moths, dragonflies and some rare snails. There is abundant bird-life and breeding birds include sparrowhawk, green woodpecker and tawny owl. The lakes on the site are also used by overwintering wildfowl, and breeding species such as little grebe and mallard. There are also colonies of the yellow-necked mouse. Additionally, Woodchester Park is notable as the site of the Animal and Plant Health Agency long term study into the epidemiology of bovine tuberculosis in badgers.

.
