= Château d'Armainvilliers =

French Anglo-Norman style building

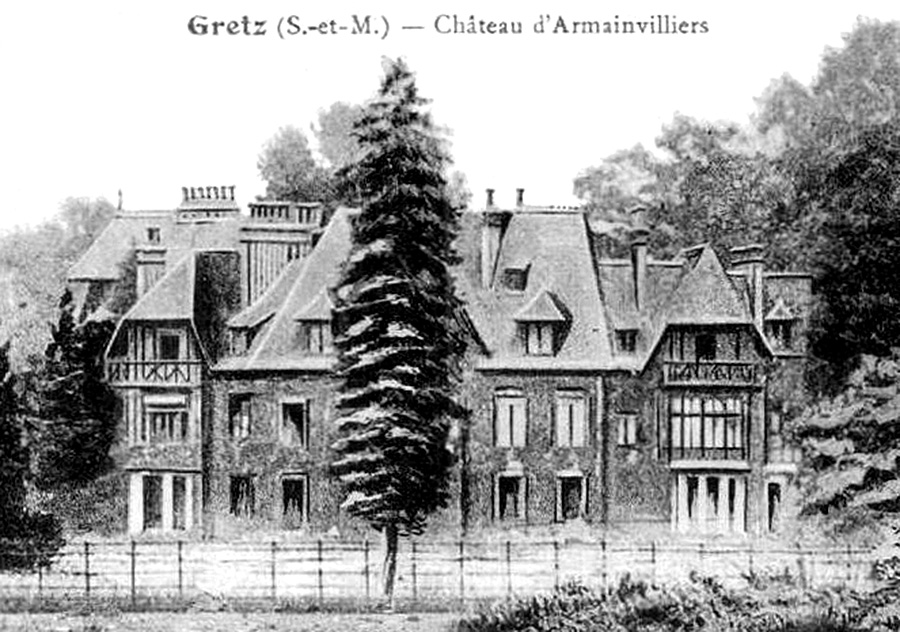
- Château d'Armainvilliers, c. 1900
- Interactive map of the Château d'Armainvilliers area

General information
- Type: Château
- Architectural style: Norman
- Location: Tournan-en-Brie, Seine-et-Marne, France
- Coordinates: 48°45′00″N 2°44′47″E
- Construction started: 1877
- Completed: 1881
- Client: Edmond de Rothschild

Design and construction
- Architects: Félix Langlais; Émile Ulmann

The Château d'Armainvilliers (French pronunciation: [ʃɑto daʁmɛ̃vilje]) is a historic château the domain of which today extends over the communes of Tournan-en-Brie and Gretz-Armainvilliers in Seine-et-Marne, France, approximately 48 km (30 mi) east-southeast of Paris. It was completed in 1881.

== History ==
A château is mentioned there from the 14th century, which gave refuge to François I in 1544 after the capture of Château-Thierry by Charles V. From this time, it became the residence of the Lords of Tournan and Gretz-Armainvilliers (the Beringhens in the 17th to 18th centuries: Jacques-Louis de Beringhen (1651–1723), first equerry of King Louis XIV, who was ennobled as the Count of Armainvilliers in June 1704. The chateau eventually passed to his son, Henri-Camille de Beringhen.

=== Bourbon-Penthièvre ===
In March 1762, King Louis XV (who had become King in 1715 at the age of five, succeeding his great-grandfather Louis XIV) exchanged the dukedom of Gisors, the Pontcarré estate, and the château, land, and Lordship of Armainvilliers, for the principality of Dombes with Louis Charles de Bourbon, Count of Eu. (Note: Louis Charles de Bourbon, Count of Eu (1701–1775), the youngest son of Louis Auguste, Duke of Maine, and Anne Louise Bénédicte de Bourbon, was a grandson of Louis XIV and Madame de Montespan. He was the last member of the legitimised house of Maine branch of the House of Bourbon, a legitimised, cadet branch of the Capetian dynasty.) Following the exchange, the Count of Eu took the title of Count of Armainvilliers. Upon the Count's death in 1775, the estate and titles passed to his younger cousin the Duke of Penthièvre, but it was partly destroyed during the French Revolution. In 1808, it was acquired by stockbroker Claude Bailliot.

Under the Restoration, the château was returned to Louise Marie Adélaïde de Bourbon, Duchess of Orléans, the wealthiest heiress in France prior to the French Revolution following the death of her brother, Louis Alexandre, Prince of Lamballe, in 1768 (the only two surviving children of the Duke of Penthièvre). After Louise, the wife of Louis Philippe II, Duke of Orléans (cousin of Louis XVI), died in 1821, her estates passed into the possession of the House of Orléans. Her son, King Louis Philippe I, ceded Armainvilliers to his sister, Princess Adélaïde d'Orléans, during the partition of 1822. Princess Adélaïde died at the Palais des Tuileries in Paris in 1847.

=== Rochefoucauld-Doudeauville ===
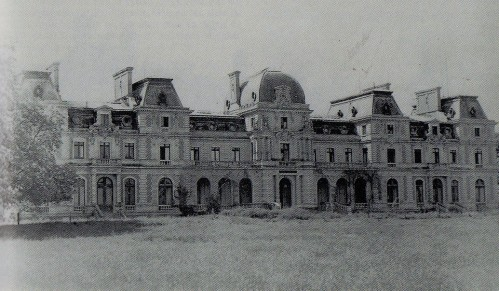
The Pereire country house in Gretz-Armainvilliers, also known as the Château d'Armainvilliers.

In 1855, after the start of the Second French Empire, Angélique de la Rochefoucauld, Duchess of Doudeauville, (Note: Angélique Herminie de La Brousse de Verteillac (1797–1881), was a daughter of François-Gabriel-Thibault of La Brousse de Verteillac, Marquis de Verteillac, Baron de La Tour Blanche, and Charlotte Félicité Élisabeth Tiercelin d'Appelvoisin. Before her marriage to Sosthènes I de La Rochefoucauld, 2nd Duke of Doudeauville, she was the widow of Félix de Bourbon-Conti (recognized natural son of Louis François, Prince of Conti).) purchased the château for 500,000 francs. The La Rochefoucauld-Doudeauville family then restored it using woodwork from the recently demolished Château de Bercy and developing the park. Her second husband, Sosthènes I de La Rochefoucauld, 2nd Duke of Doudeauville, former aide-de-camp to King Charles X, died at the château in 1864.

In 1863, the Duchess brought a lawsuit against her neighbor Émile Péreire, "on the ground that he had infringed her rights by giving the name of Château d'Armainvilliers to a mansion which he has built in the vicinity of her residence." (Note: Péreire had purchased the forest of Armainvilliers, which adjoined the Rochefoucauld estate (both former properties of Princess Adélaïde, which were sold following the 22 January 1852 decree relating to the estates of the Orléans family). Péreire built a mansion in the forest which he allowed to be called Château d'Armainvilliers. The Duke wrote to Péreire in August 1861, asking him to choose another name but he declined to rename it. After a three-day hearing, the Civil Tribunal of the Seine decided that the Château d'Armainvilliers name was the property of the Duchess, and that Péreire "had no right to give it a name which had for centuries been appropriated to another residence; and that he must henceforth discontinue the use of the name in question.") The Pereire's Château d'Armainvilliers was bombed by mistake by the U.S. Air Force during World War II in 1944, and demolished in 1950.

=== Rothschild ===
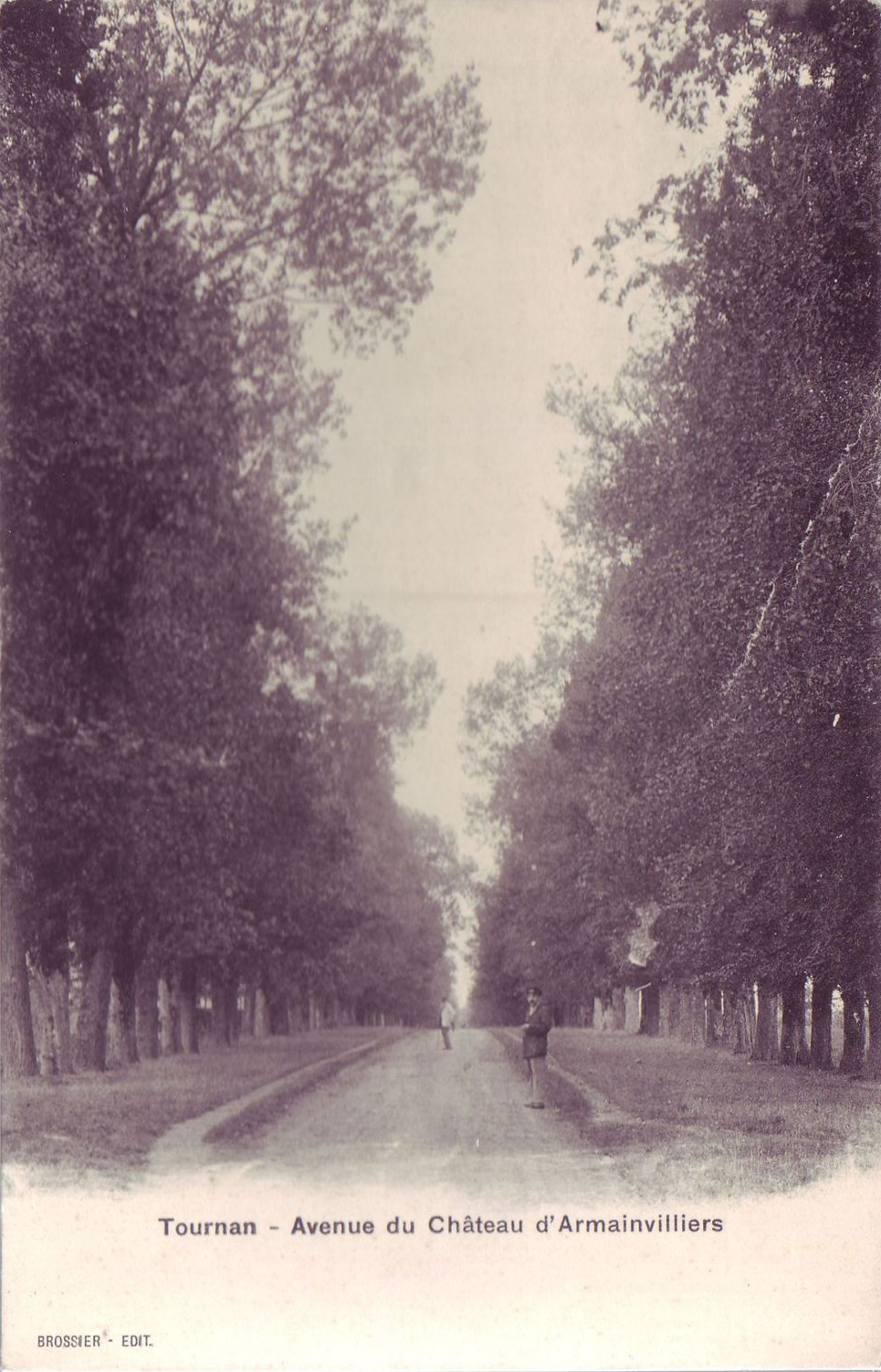
Postcard of the avenue leading to the Château d'Armainvilliers, 1903

In 1877, the estate was acquired by Baron Edmond de Rothschild, who completely razed the existing château and replaced it with a S-shaped modern residence in the Anglo-Norman style, primarily designed by architects Félix Langlais and Émile Ulmann. The estate featured guardhouses, Norman-style farms, a number of outbuildings, and a large orangery done up in the English style. Between 1881 and 1938, additional additions were made to the château and the estate grew from 250 hectares (620 acres) to 3,961 hectares (9,790 acres) by the end of the century. During their renovations, they added seven en suite bathrooms, a rarity at the time. Rothschild entrusted the development of the park to Élie Lainé.

During World War I, an infirmary was set up in the château, and during World War II, it was occupied by German troops. Baron Rothschild died in 1934 and the estate passed to his second son, Maurice de Rothschild. Upon his death in 1957, it passed to Maurice's son Edmond Adolphe de Rothschild.

=== Alawi ===
In the 1980s, Rothschild sold the estate to the King of Morocco, Hassan II of the Alawi dynasty, who carried out extensive rehabilitation work. His son, King Mohammed VI, sold the château for €200 million in 2008, reportedly to Esam Janahi, a leading figure in Islamic finance.

In 2024, the 100-room 96,875 sq ft (9,000.0 m^{2}) château situated on nearly 2,500 acres was listed for sale for €425 million, which if sold at that price, would be the most expensive residential property in the world.

== See also ==
- List of castles in France
