= Woodchester Mansion =

Grade I listed mansion

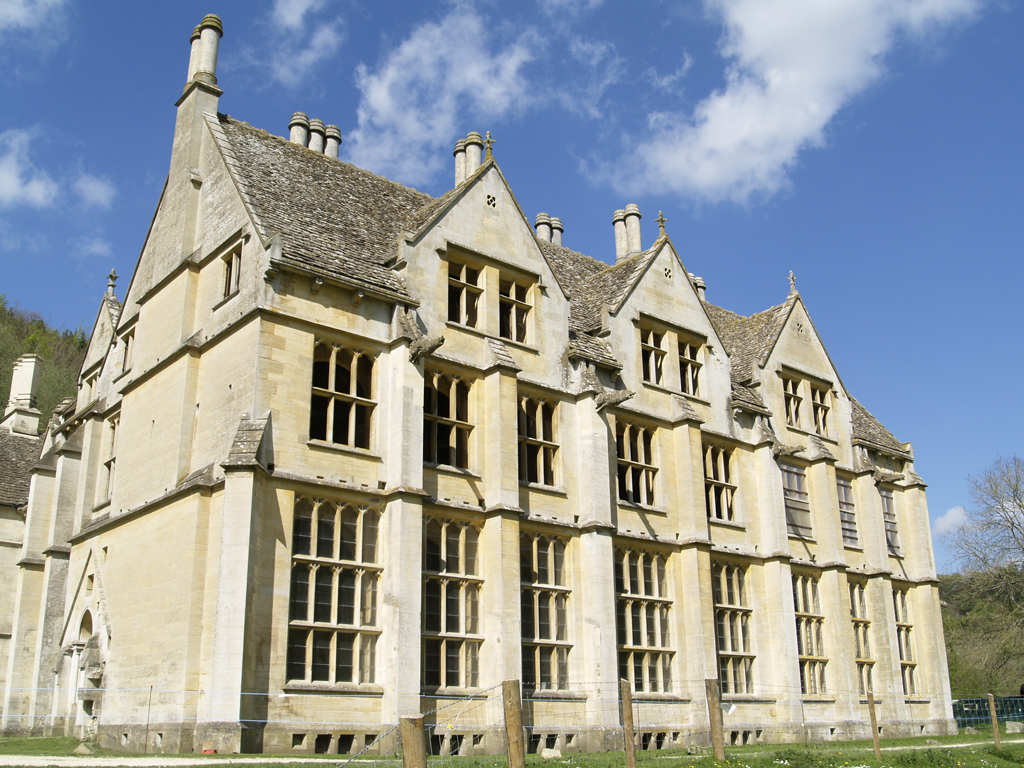
- View of the south front

General information
- Architectural style: Gothic Revival
- Location: Nympsfield, Gloucestershire, England
- Construction started: 1858
- Completed: 1870 (partially)
- Client: William Leigh

Technical details
- Structural system: Cotswold stone /vaulting

Design and construction
- Architect: Benjamin Bucknall

Woodchester Mansion is an unfinished, Gothic Revival mansion house in Nympsfield, Gloucestershire, England. It is on the site of an earlier house known as Spring Park. The mansion is a Grade I listed building.

The mansion was abandoned by its builders in the middle of construction, leaving behind a building that appears complete from the outside, but with floors, plaster and whole rooms missing inside. It has remained in this state since the mid-1870s.

The mansion's creator William Leigh bought the Woodchester Park estate for £100,000 in 1854, demolishing the existing house, which had been home to the Ducie family.

A colony of approximately 200 greater horseshoe bats reside within the attic of the mansion, and have been studied continuously since the mid-1950s.

== History ==
The original manor house for Woodchester was in the heart of the settlement of Woodchester, next to the old church. After a succession of owners, the manor was granted to George Huntley in 1564. Subsequently, he decided to create a deer park, a little distance from the manor house, by both purchase and through the enclosure of common agricultural land in the Inchbrook Valley. A seven-mile long boundary wall surrounded the park and by 1610 a hunting lodge was built at the western end.

=== Ducie family ===
The expense of creating the park is thought to have nearly bankrupted the Huntleys and the manor and park were sold to Sir Robert Ducie in 1631. Later generations of the Ducie family decided to build a grand country house and, at the same time, create a magnificent landscaped park out of the deer park. Quite why this site was chosen will forever remain an enigma. The steep sides of the valley mean that for much of the year the sun is obscured. The house being positioned halfway down the length of the valley reduces the dramatic views that would have surely been seen if it had been built on a higher spot. The site is neither convenient nor easy for transport. As it was not the Ducie's principal residence, they may have looked at it more as an isolated retreat. In any case, they decided to extend and adapt the hunting lodge and lay out a formal garden, and although a precise start date is not known, the house – called Spring Park – was constructed during the 1740s. Certainly by 1750 it was finished, as Frederick, Prince of Wales stayed – and in 1788, George III visited.

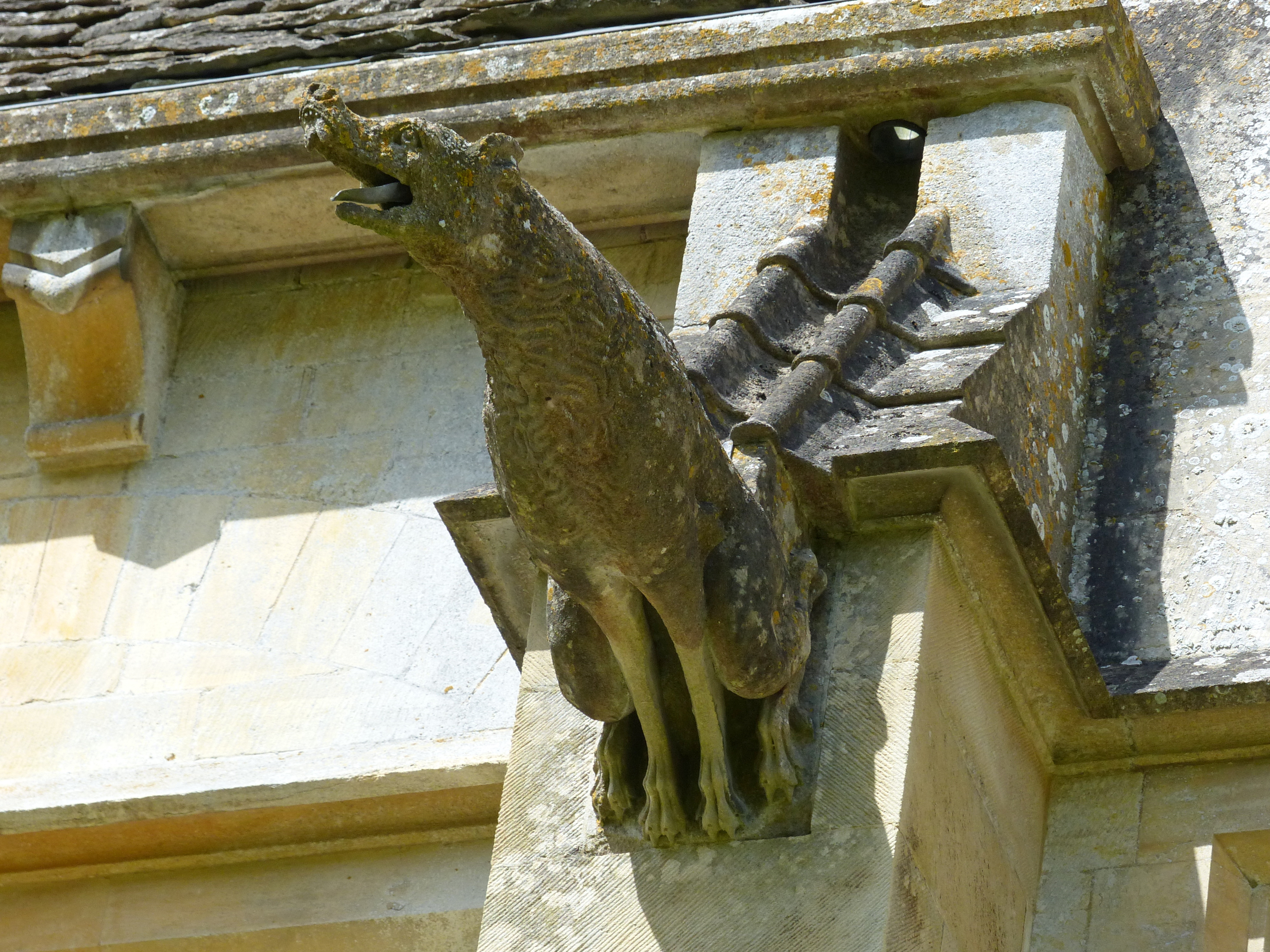
Gargoyle at Woodchester Mansion

Before the visit of George III – and only 30 years after the formal gardens were established – a start was made on extensively re-landscaping the grounds from plans drawn-up by John Speyers, working with Capability Brown. This plan removed the more formal aspect of the garden to create a naturalistic park. Part of the plan also turned a group of small fishponds into a series of lakes – and this was done in the late 18th or early 19th century.

Not only was the park remodelled but the house too – several times in the 1770s and 1830s (including the reintroduction of a more formal garden area by Humphry Repton) but in 1840 when the 2nd Earl Ducie wanted further alterations and repairs, the estimate was thought to be too great and the estate was sold to William Leigh, a wealthy merchant.

=== William Leigh ===
William Leigh was born in Liverpool, and educated at Oxford and Eton. At the time of the purchase he was living at Little Aston Hall in Staffordshire, where he had recently converted to the Roman Catholic faith. This and the Gothic Revival style in architecture were fashionable, and formed the ideology for the new house. He approached Augustus Pugin to draw up the plans.

Pugin drew up plans for the house but in 1846 he became ill and the project was allowed to drop. Leigh meanwhile gave land in South Woodchester to a community of Roman Catholic Passionist fathers for a monastery and church. He then turned to Charles Francis Hansom, whose brother designed the famous Hansom cab of Victorian London, to take over the architectural planning.

In 1857 Leigh dropped Hansom, and unexpectedly hired Benjamin Bucknall, a young man who was an aspiring architect and assistant to Hansom, but very inexperienced. Bucknall set about studying Gothic Revival architecture – the result, Woodchester Mansion, is Bucknall's masterpiece.

Woodchester Mansion was constructed from 1858 to 1870, and finally in 1873, when William Leigh died, all work stopped.

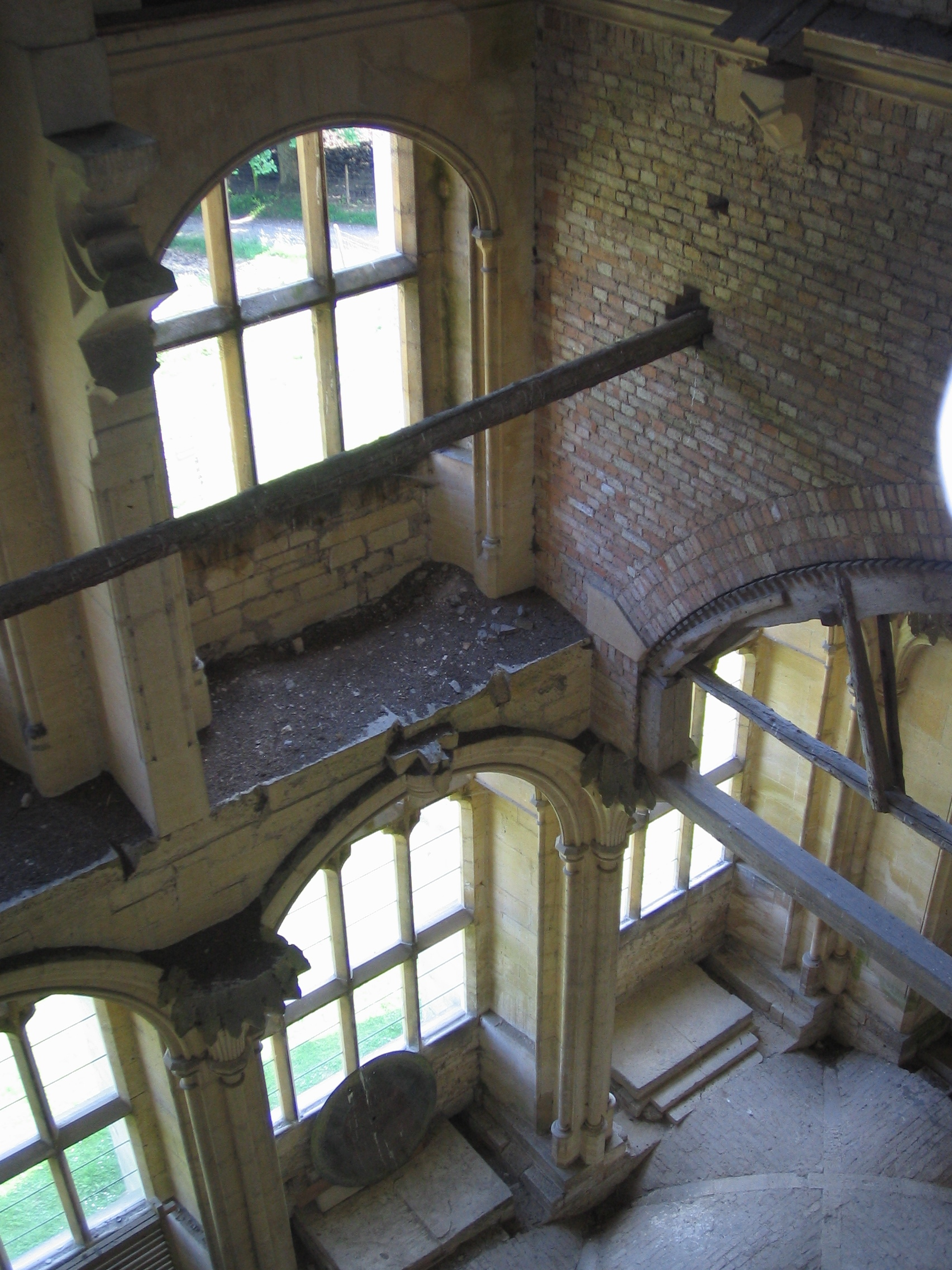
Interior of the South Front. The wood support form used in building the brick archway is still in place.

It may be surmised that Leigh's surviving family were less keen on the design for shortly after Leigh's death they asked another architect, James Wilson of Bath, Somerset, to propose a new design. This he did in his flamboyant Italianate style, but the cost of completing a new mansion was too great for any of them to afford. (Indeed, it raises the question of how they ever thought they could both demolish and build a completely new building, but clearly it underlines that they did not share their father's passion for living in monastic conditions.) Wilson had his own opinion of the site and wanted the family to build, if they were going to, in a new location in the valley.

Wilson wrote:

I consider the situation far from the best that might have been selected on the estate; it is low, damp, and has much shut-in on the south, west and north, so that a free circulation of air is impeded. Its position is much too close to the high bank on the north, which will always keep the house damp, and if this bank were sloped off and formed into terraces (which must be allowed with a large outlay) still there would be a closeness and humidity, which would always prove to be detrimental.

In the meantime, Bucknall had moved to Algiers where he worked on domestic projects and villas. The reason for his move is unknown, although poor health is one reason put forward, but without doubt he must have been bitterly disappointed that his grand vision and architectural statement had not been realised. Indeed, in 1878 he wrote to Leigh's son:

there is nothing more sad to the sight than an unfinished work and it is even more forlorn than a ruin of a building which has served its purpose...

In 1894 Cardinal Vaughan paid a visit to the house, and the drawing room was updated, but from that day on the house stood often empty. The next heir, Vincent Leigh, briefly lived in part of the house, and his sisters in the gatehouse.

=== 20th century ===
In 1938, William Leigh's granddaughters, Blanche and Beatrice, sold the house – and what was left of the estate – to a mental health charity, the Barnwood House Trust. They intended to convert the mansion into a mental hospital, but subsequently this plan was shelved. During the Second World War, the grounds were used as a billet for Canadian and American troops, and the mansion itself used by St Paul's Teacher Training College. It was then abandoned to the elements. Fortunately, its isolated position meant it did not suffer from vandalism; it was not redeveloped.

Local people ensured it never fell into total disrepair and the mansion and a small area of surrounding land was eventually purchased by Stroud District Council, who leased it to a building restoration trust, the Woodchester Mansion Trust, in 1992. A board of Trustees manage the mansion and open it to the public from 1 April to 31 October on Fridays to Sundays and Bank Holiday Mondays (i.e. closed every Monday unless a Bank Holiday) with the aid of volunteers. The Trust also operates a programme of training courses in stone conservation and craftsmanship at the mansion.

== Parkland and buildings ==
The parkland around the mansion is owned by the National Trust, and is open to the public as part of its Woodchester Park. Woodchester Park includes several buildings including a gatehouse, boathouse, several cottages and an ice house. There are several large lakes with many paths and walks through the fields and woods. Much of Woodchester village was owned by Woodchester Park. Entrance to the park is free with a National Trust pay-and-display car park near the entrance, situated at the western end of the park, off the B4066 road. Toilets for Mansion visitors are provided near the mansion, these are only open when the Mansion is open to the public. The mansion itself has an entrance fee.

== Media appearances ==
Woodchester has featured in a number of television programmes including: the BBC wildlife series Naturewatch in 1982; ITV's Magick Eve in 2003 with a performance from the UK Goth band, Cauda Pavonis;. A 2006 BBC production of Dracula;; the second series of The Crown; and a number of paranormal shows.
