= Félix Langlais =

French architect (1827–1889)

Félix Langlais (French pronunciation: [feliks lɑ̃ɡlɛ]; 7 August 1827 – 27 January 1889) was a French architect.

== Life ==
Born in the former 6th arrondissement of Paris, he was a laureate of the Société centrale des architectes and was appointed an architect to the Rothschild family in France, designing:

- in Paris:
  - transformation of the hôtel de Pontalba, 41, rue du Faubourg-Saint-Honoré, 8th arrondissement, from 1878 onwards, for Edmond de Rothschild
  - several buildings at 24 and 26 rue Jean-Goujon, 8th arrondissement, for Meyer-Alfonse-James de Rothschild
  - a hôtel particulier at 45 and 47 rue de Monceau, 8th arrondissement, for Adolphe de Rothschild (now demolished)
  - five flats on the place de Wagram, 17th arrondissement
- several railway stations, sheds and depots for the Compagnie des chemins de fer des Ardennes c. 1860, notably those on the Creil to Beauvais line and Reims station
- the château d'Armainvilliers (Seine-et-Marne) in the Anglo-Norman style, 1880-1900, in collaboration with Émile Ulmann, for Edmond de Rothschild
- restoration of the 17th-century building at Vaux-de-Cernay Abbey, for Charlotte de Rothschild

He died in the 8th arrondissement of Paris in 1889.
