= Hôtel de Pontalba =

Official residence of the United States Ambassador to France

Coordinates: 48.8694°N 2.3184°E

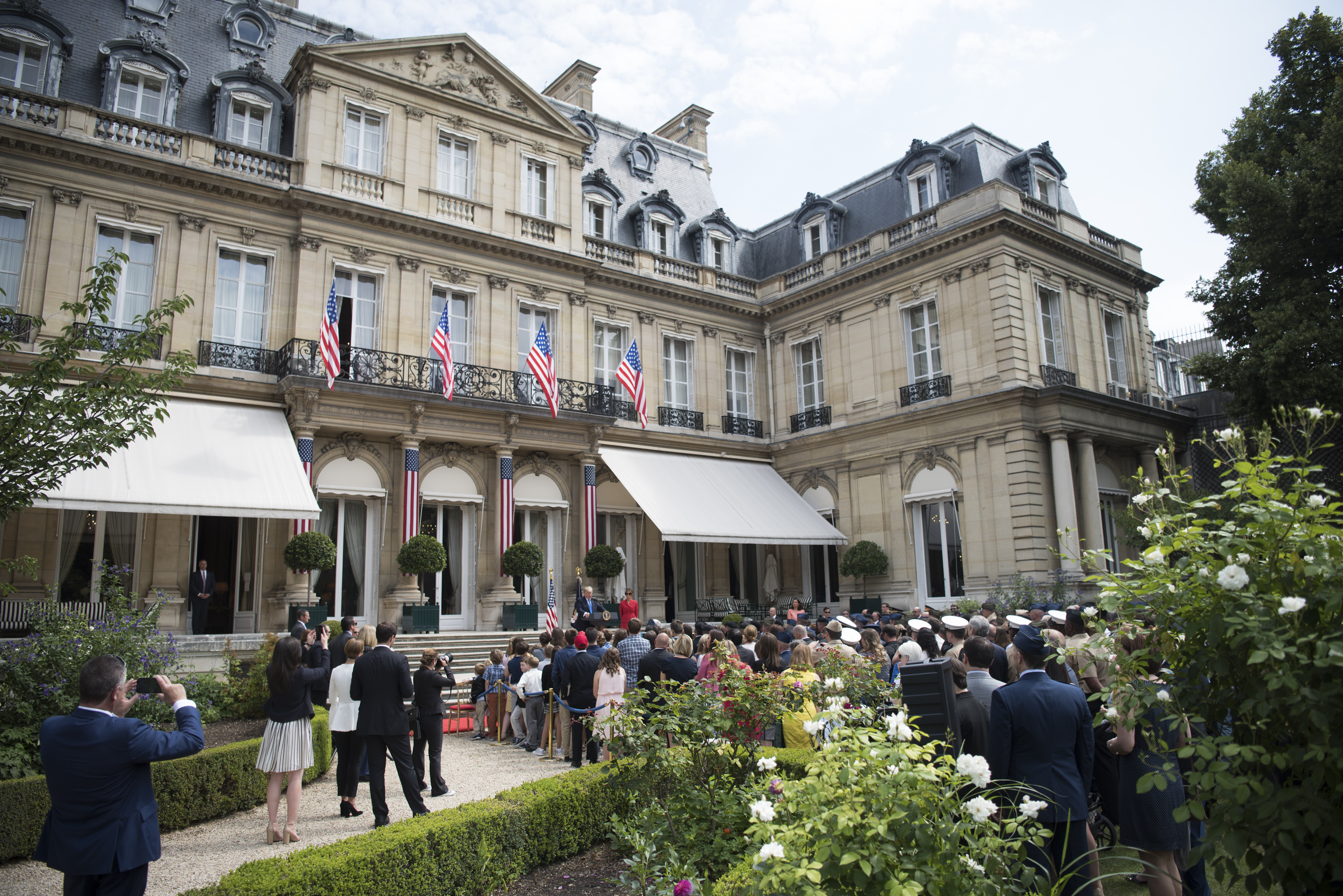
- President Donald Trump addressing a crowd in the gardens of the Hôtel de Pontalba, 2017
- Interactive map of the Hôtel de Pontalba area

General information
- Type: Official residence
- Architectural style: Hôtel particulier (mansion)
- Location: 41 Rue du Faubourg Saint-Honoré, Paris, France
- Current tenants: United States Ambassador to France (since 1971)
- Completed: 1855
- Client: Baroness Micaela Almonester de Pontalba
- Owner: United States government (since 1948)

Design and construction
- Architect: Louis Visconti

Renovating team
- Architect: Félix Langlais

The Hôtel de Pontalba (French pronunciation: [otɛl də pɔ̃talba]) is an hôtel particulier, a type of large townhouse in France, at 41 Rue du Faubourg Saint-Honoré in the 8th arrondissement of Paris. It has been the official residence of the United States ambassador to France since 1971.

== History ==
In 1710, Henri François d'Aguesseau, Chancellor of France, acquired a tract of land which included the present site of the Hôtel de Pontalba. Ten years later, he built a house, and the house subsequently passed through a series of owners. New Orleans-born Baroness Micaela Almonester de Pontalba purchased the property in 1836, and by 1842, she had demolished the d'Aguesseau house and commissioned the architect Louis Visconti to design a newer house for the site.

Construction of the mansion was finished in 1855. Baroness de Pontalba occupied the mansion until her death in 1874, upon which it was willed to her heirs who sold the property to Baron Edmond James de Rothschild in 1876. Baron de Rothschild hired Felix Langlais to substantially renovate, enlarge, and embellish the residence, leaving only the original gatehouse and portals intact, but following much of the H-shaped ground floor plan.

During the German occupation of France, the mansion, then owned by Baron Maurice de Rothschild, was requisitioned as an officers' club for the Luftwaffe. After the war, it was rented out to the British Royal Air Force Club, and then to the U.S. In 1948, the American government purchased the building, primarily for the United States Information Service. These offices were moved to the Hôtel Talleyrand as restoration was completed in 1971 during the tenure of Ambassador Arthur K. Watson. The building then became the official residence of the ambassador.

== See also ==
- France–United States relations
- Embassy of the United States, Paris
- Deerfield Residence – Dublin residence of the US Ambassador to Ireland
- Winfield House – London residence of the US Ambassador to the UK
