= Catholic sisters and nuns in the United States =

American catholic nuns

Catholic sisters and nuns in the United States have played a major role in American religion, education, nursing and social work since the early 19th century. In Catholic Europe, convents were heavily endowed over the centuries, and were sponsored by the aristocracy. Religious orders were founded by entrepreneurial women who saw a need and an opportunity, and were staffed by devout women from poor families. The number of Catholic nuns grew exponentially from about 900 in the year 1840, to a maximum of nearly 200,000 in 1965, falling to 56,000 in 2010. According to an article posted on CatholicPhilly.com, the website of the Archdiocese of Philadelphia, Pennsylvania, in October 2018, National Religious Retirement Office statistics showed that number as 47,160 in 2016, adding that “about 77 percent of women religious are older than 70.” In March 2022, the NRRO was reporting statistics from 2018, citing the number of professed sisters as 45,100. The network of Catholic institutions provided high status lifetime careers as nuns in parochial schools, hospitals, and orphanages. They were part of an international Catholic network, with considerable movement back and forth from Britain, France, Germany and Canada.

Some American Catholics came to the defense of American sisters when the Vatican initiated an investigation into what it viewed as unorthodox leanings among the Leadership Conference of Women Religious. The controversial investigation, which was viewed by many U.S. Catholics as a "vexing and unjust inquisition of the sisters who ran the church's schools, hospitals and charities" was ultimately closed in 2015 in meeting with Pope Francis.

== History ==
The first women religious in what would become the United States, were fourteen French Ursuline nuns who arrived in New Orleans in July 1727, and opened Ursuline Academy, which continues in operation and is the oldest continuously operating school for girls in the United States.

The Sisters of Saint Anne are a Roman Catholic religious institute, founded in 1850 in Vaudreuil, Quebec, Canada, by the Blessed Marie Anne Blondin, S.S.A. The Sisters arrived in the United States in September 1867 at the request of the Bishop of Buffalo, opening a school in Oswego, New York. Between 1840 and 1930 approximately 900,000 Quebec residents, most of them French Canadian left for the United States. Textile manufacturing centers and other industrial towns such as Lewiston, Maine, Fall River, Massachusetts, Woonsocket, Rhode Island and Manchester, New Hampshire attracted significant French-Canadian populations. The Sisters went on to expand throughout northern New York and New England, staffing many schools of French-speaking parishes.

== American communities ==
- The Daughters of Charity of St. Vincent de Paul were founded as the Sisters of Charity of St. Joseph in 1809 in Emmitsburg, Maryland by Elizabeth Ann Seton, who had hoped to establish a community of Daughters of Charity founded in France by St. Vincent de Paul in 1633. Unable to do so because of the political situation during the Napoleonic Wars, she adopted the Rules of the Daughters of Charity. The institute established other communities elsewhere, many of which subsequently became independent. In 1850 the community at Emmitsburg affiliated with the Mother House of the Daughters of Charity in Paris and at that time adopted the blue habit and the white collar and cornette. The community in Emmitsburg became the first American province of the Daughters of Charity.
  - In 1817, Mother Seton sent three Sisters to New York at the invitation of Bishop Connolly to open a home for dependent children. In 1846 the New York congregation incorporated as a separate order, the Sisters of Charity of New York. The Sisters in New York retained the rule, customs, and spiritual exercises established by Mother Seton, and her black habit, cape and cap. In 1869 they established The New York Foundling, an orphanage for abandoned children, and in 1880 opened St. Ann's Hospital to provide medical treatment for unmarried mothers. In 1854 the New York Children's Aid Society began sending orphans and neglected children to live outside the city. The majority were sent to the West and Midwest. In 1875, the Sisters initiated a similar program working in conjunction with priests throughout the Midwest and South in an effort to place these children in Catholic families. The Foundling Hospital sent infants and toddlers to prearranged Roman Catholic homes from 1875 to 1919. By the 1910s 1,000 children a year were placed with new families.
- The Dominican Sisters of Peace trace their heritage to the original Dominican foundation in America, the Dominican Sisters of St. Catherine of Sienna, founded in 1822 in Springfield, Kentucky. In 2009 seven Dominican congregations merged to form the new Dominican Sisters of Peace. The seven were: the Dominican Sisters of St. Catharine, KY; Dominican Sisters of Akron, Ohio; Dominican Sisters of St. Mary of the Springs, Columbus, Ohio; Dominican Sisters of Great Bend, Kansas; Dominican Sisters of Oxford, Michigan; Dominican Sisters of St. Mary's, New Orleans and the Eucharistic Missionaries of St. Dominic, New Orleans, Louisiana. In 2012. In 2012 the Dominican Sisters of St. Catherine de’ Ricci also joined.
- The Sisters of the Divine Compassion are a Roman Catholic religious institute founded in New York City in 1886 by Mother Mary Veronica – formerly Mary Dannat Starr and Msgr. Thomas Preston.

== Expansion before 1860 ==
Historian Joseph Mannard has suggested that there was a "convent revolution" in Antebellum America. The number of orders and sisters grew rapidly. In 1830 there were only 10 orders in the U.S., with under 500 sisters. By 1860 45 orders had been added and there were over 5,000 sisters. In 1830 there were only 20 Catholic female academies in the U.S., by 1860 there were 201. In 1830 there was one sister-founded hospital in the U.S.. By 1860 there were 35. This increase in numbers was accompanied by an increasing public awareness of Catholic women religious.

== Civil War ==
The male doctors of the Civil War era were generally dubious about the civilian women volunteering to be nurses. However, they were generally appreciative of the Catholic orders of sisters that operated their own hospitals, and sent cadres to Army hospitals to help after bloody battles.

- When the Civil War broke out Mother Mary of St. Angela, C.S.C. organized a corps of the Sisters of the Holy Cross to care for the sick and wounded soldiers. She established hospitals, both temporary and permanent, and, when Generals failed to secure needed aid for the sick and wounded, she made trips to Washington on their behalf.
- In May 1861 Mother Mary Cecilia Bailly, S.P., Superior General of the Sisters of Providence of Saint Mary-of-the-Woods, sent Sisters to staff military hospitals in Indianapolis and Vincennes, Indiana. They also tended patients at the Confederate prison located in Indianapolis, which held at one time 7,000 prisoners. At the end of the war the Hospital was returned to the city, and the Sisters opened St John's Infirmary for those soldiers with no place to go, but not yet strong enough to travel. The Sisters of Providence are now honored by a monument in Washington, D.C., dedicated to the Nuns of the Battlefield of the Civil War.
- In June 1861 Sister Anthony O'Connell, S.C. was one of six Sisters of Charity of Cincinnati who went to Camp Dennison to provide nursing assistance. Sisters also served at Cumberland, Virginia, treating the wounded of both armies. More than one-third of the community, which by then had more than one hundred members, served. Sister Anthony developed the Battlefield Triage. Her method was "the first recognizably modern triage techniques in war zones, saved countless lives through faster hospital treatment and won her praise from President Lincoln". Her medical skills allowed her to intervene to save soldiers' limbs from amputation. For her service at the Battle of Shiloh Sister Anthony became known as the "Angel of the Battlefield". Her portrait hangs in the Smithsonian Institution in Washington, DC.
- In 1862 the Sisters of Charity of New York began nursing Civil War wounded in St. Joseph's Military Hospital, at McGowan's Pass, the former site of Mt. St. Vincent in Central Park. The hospital closed in 1865.
- Mary Frances Schervier, S.P.S.F. of the Poor Sisters of St. Francis based in Aachen, Germany, visited the congregations communities in the United States in 1863, and helped her Sisters nurse wounded soldiers. St. Mary Hospital in Hoboken, New Jersey was founded for this work.
- The Congregation of the Sisters of Charity of the Incarnate Word, Houston is a religious institute of women begun in 1866 in Galveston, Texas, as Texas was suffering from the ravages of the Civil War, coupled with the tragedy of a rapidly spreading cholera epidemic.
  - A second Community was started in San Antonio, in 1869, and is now the largest group of religious women in Texas. They founded San Antonio's first public hospital, known today as Christus Santa Rosa Hospital. They began educational work in 1874 and founded the University of the Incarnate Word in 1881.

Other communities who assisted the sick and wounded include: the Sisters of St. Joseph, Carmelites, Dominican Order, Ursulines, Sisters of Mercy, Congregation of the Sisters of Our Lady of Mercy, Daughters of Charity of St. Vincent de Paul, Sisters of Charity of Nazareth, and the Congregation of Divine Providence.

== Hospitals ==
The majority of these women followed an active apostolate; the number of contemplative communities being relatively small. About sixty percent were primarily involved with teaching, while the rest were engaged in nursing and administration in hospitals.

American hospitals in the 19th century were largely designed for poor people in the larger cities. There were no paying patients. Very small proprietary hospitals were operated by practicing physicians and surgeons to take care of their own paying patients in better facilities than the charity hospitals offered. By the 1840s, the major religious denominations, especially the Catholics and Methodists, began opening hospitals in major cities. In the 1840s–1880s era, Catholics in Philadelphia founded two hospitals, for the Irish and German Catholic immigrants. They depended on revenues from the paying sick, and became important health and welfare institutions in the Catholic community. By 1900 the Catholics had set up hospitals in most major cities. In New York the Dominicans, Franciscans, Sisters of Charity, and other orders set up hospitals to care primarily for their own ethnic group. By the 1920s they were serving everyone in the neighborhood.

In smaller cities too the Catholics set up hospitals, such as St. Patrick Hospital in Missoula, Montana. The Sisters of Providence opened it in 1873. It was in part funded by the county contract to care for the poor, and also operated a day school and a boarding school. The nuns provided nursing care especially for infectious diseases and traumatic injuries. They also proselytized the patients to attract converts and restore lapsed Catholics back into the Church. They built a larger hospital in 1890. Catholic hospitals were largely owned and staffed by orders of nuns (who took oaths of poverty), as well as unpaid nursing students. When the population of nuns dropped sharply after the 1960s, the hospitals were sold. The Catholic Hospital Association formed in 1915.

== Parochial schools ==
By the middle of the 19th century, the Catholics in larger cities started building their own parochial school system. The main impetus was fear that exposure to Protestant teachers in the public schools, and Protestant fellow students, would lead to a loss of faith. Protestants reacted by strong opposition to any public funding of parochial schools. The Catholics nevertheless built their elementary schools, parish by parish, using very low paid sisters as teachers. They created the world's largest network of religious schools.

In the classrooms, the highest priorities were piety, orthodoxy, and strict discipline. Knowledge of the subject matter was a minor concern. The sisters came from numerous denominations, and there was no effort to provide joint teachers training programs. The bishops were indifferent. Around 1911, led by The Catholic University of America, Catholic colleges began summer institutes to train the sisters in pedagogical techniques. Dolan notes that in the early 20th century a majority young nuns who became teachers had not attended high school. They taught for a half-century or more and long past World War II, the Catholic schools were noted for inferior conditions compared to the public schools, and less well-trained teachers. The rapid growth of the Catholic population continued, and after 1945 it started to pour into the suburbs. At the peak in 1960, 13,000 schools served over 5 million students.

By the 1960s there was a growing lack of teaching sisters. The solution was to hire much more expensive lay teachers, who grew from 4% of the elementary teachers in the Chicago archdiocese in 1950 to 38% by 1965.

== Numbers ==
The numbers grew rapidly, from 900 sisters in 15 communities in 1840, 50,000 in 170 orders in 1900, and 135,000 in 300 different orders by 1930. Starting in 1820, the sisters always outnumbered the priests and brothers. Young women entered after elementary school, and spent one year at a novitiate training program before entering full-time roles. Their total number peaked in 1965 at 180,000 then plunged to 56,000 in 2010. Most simply left their orders. There were very few replacements. In the early 1960s, 7000 young women a year joined the orders; by 1990 there were only 100 a year.

	Sisters	Change	Orders	Change
1720	0	0	0	0
1730	14	+14	1	+1
1840	900	+886	15	+14
1900	50,000	+49,100	170	+155
1930	135,000	+85,000	300	+130
1965	180,000	+45,000	300+	+
1970	161,000	-19,000	300+	n/a
1975	135,000	-26,000	300+	n/a
1980	127,000	-8,000	300+	n/a
1985	115,000	-12,000	300+	n/a
1990	103,000	-12,000	300+	n/a
1995	91,000	-12,000	300+	n/a
2000	80,000	-11,000	300*	n/a
2005	69,000	-11,000	250+	n/a
2010	58,000	-11,000	250*	n/a
2014	50,000	-8,000	200+	n/a

*estimate

=== Know Nothing attacks ===
In the period before the American Civil War, it was common for anti-Catholic Protestants to sponsor semi-pornographic lectures by ex-Catholic nuns. Ugly rumors spread to the effect that convents and nunneries were organized for the sexual pleasure of the male priests, with the corpses of dead babies buried underneath. The Know-Nothing movement of the 1850s was especially focused on these allegations. Winning control of the Massachusetts state legislature in 1854, the Know Nothings set up a legislative investigation to try and substantiate the rumors. The press had a field day following the story, especially when it was discovered that the key reformer was using committee funds to pay for a prostitute in Boston. The legislature shut down its committee, ejected the reformer, and saw its investigation become a laughing stock.

== Religious role versus professional role ==
The tension between the sisters' religious commitment and their professional role emerged in the 19th century and grew more serious over time. In the 19th century the women generally saw the religious role as paramount, with their service to God expressed through their nursing or teaching or other activities. The bishops put little emphasis on advanced training or education. In hospitals, the sisters were prohibited from working in obstetric units, or venereal disease care. By the 20th century, however, the demands for professionalism in nursing grew stronger; many Catholic hospitals opened nursing schools, and the students did much of the routine nursing care for patients. In 1948 the Conference of Catholic Schools of Nursing was formed to promote college education for the nursing sisters. Before the 1940s the Catholic educators held that sisters who had not graduated from high school could learn to teach from their elders and by experience, while the public schools were requiring much stronger credentials. The goal was to quickly open as many schools as possible. The 90,000 teaching sisters were served by 150 collegiate centers designed to provide them a bachelor's degree before they taught.

== Language and race ==
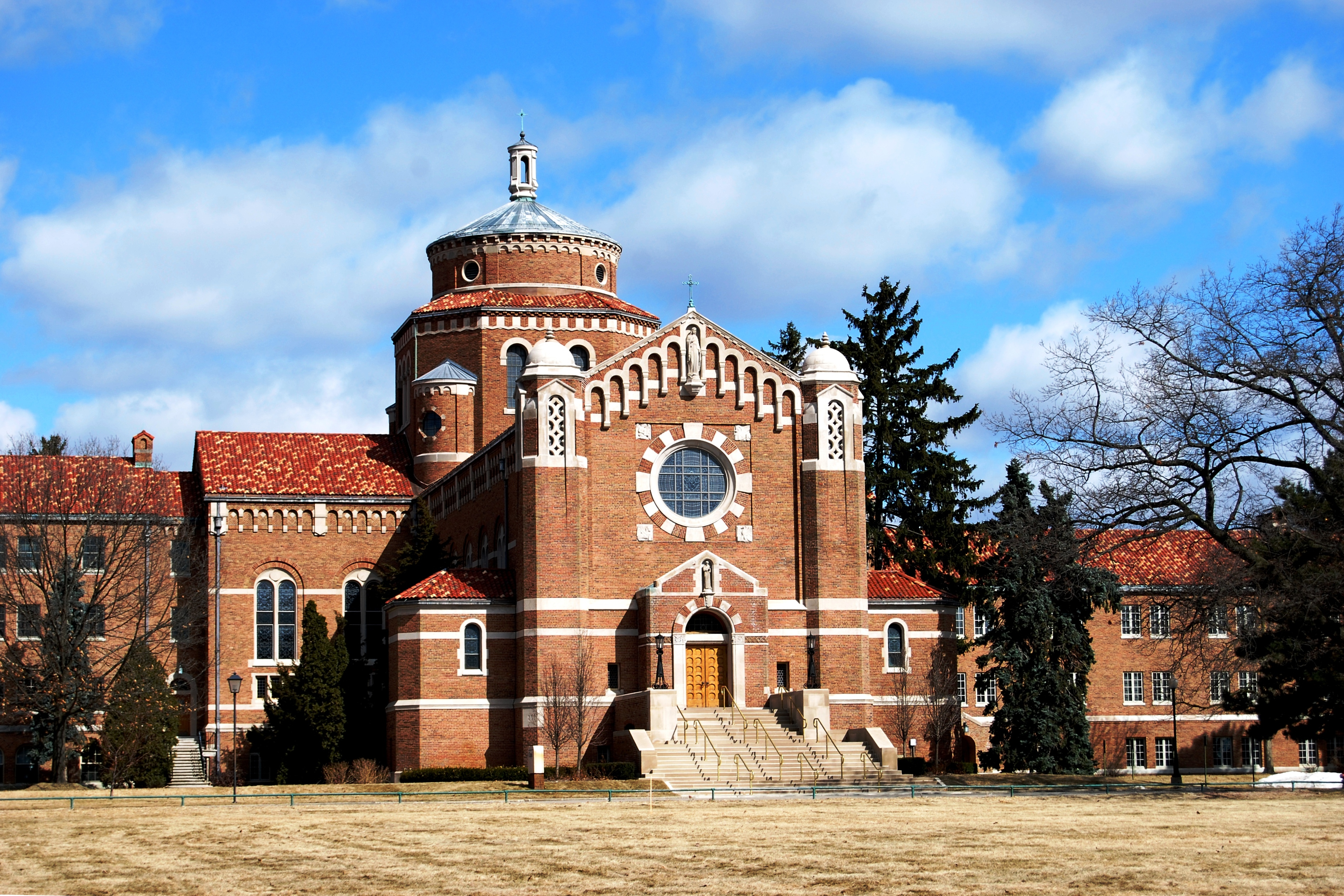
Chapel (1936) of the Felician Sisters in Livonia, Michigan.

Bishop Jean-Marie Odin (1800–1870), rebuilt the Catholic Church in antebellum Texas. Odin vigorously recruited priests and religious workers from the Eastern states, Quebec, England, and France. He reached the Hispanic, Irish, German and Polish children by bringing in the Ursuline teaching order of sisters and the Missionary Oblate priests of Mary Immaculate.

In German districts, the Catholic parochial schools were taught entirely in German until World War I, despite the protests of Yankees and Irish Catholics who tried to Anglicize those schools through the Bennett Law of 1890 in Wisconsin.

The Americanization of new immigrants was a major role for the teaching sisters especially with the arrival of the Italians, Poles and others from Eastern and Southern Europe in the late 19th century, and the arrival of Hispanics after 1960. The Felician Sisters originated in Poland and came to the United States in 1874, which became its main base. The sisters provided social mobility for young Polish women. Although the congregation was involved in the care of orphans, the aged, and the sick, teaching remained its primary concern. In Toledo, Ohio, in the early 20th century Polish nuns were used to assist the assimilation of Polish children. The sisters deemphasized the children's Polish heritage and taught in English, making frequent reference to Polish words.

In Chicago, some of the black children arriving from Louisiana were already Catholic, and were taught by Catholic sisters. The primarily Irish American Sisters of the Blessed Sacrament for Indians and Colored People, the mostly German-American Franciscan Sisters, and the Polish-American Sisters of the Holy Family lived in the all-black segregated neighborhoods, where they learned about the pervasiveness of racism in America.

== Organization ==
There are four United States federations of institutes of consecrated life and societies of apostolic life which have received approval from the Holy See, namely the Council of Major Superiors of Women Religious (CMSWR), the Conference of Major Superiors of Men's Institutes USA, the Leadership Conference of Women Religious, and the US Conference of Secular Institutes.

In April 1956, the Holy See's Congregation of the Affairs of Religious requested that religious sisters in the U.S. form a national conference. In November of that year, the committee of sisters in the U.S. called a meeting in Chicago of general and provincial superiors of pontifical communities to consider the formation of a national conference. They voted unanimously to establish the Conference of Major Superiors of Women to "promote the spiritual welfare" of the country's women religious, "ensure increasing effectiveness of their apostolate", and "foster closer fraternal cooperation with all religious of the United States, the hierarchy, the clergy, and Catholic associations". In 1971, the name was changed to the Leadership Conference of Women Religious. As of 2015, the conference includes over 1500 members, encompassing approximately 80 percent of the 57,000 women religious in the United States. The conference describes its charter as assisting its members to "collaboratively carry out their service of leadership to further the mission of the Gospel in today's world". The canonically-approved organization collaborates in the Catholic church and in society to "influence systemic change, studying significant trends and issues within the church and society, utilizing our corporate voice in solidarity with people who experience any form of violence or oppression, and creating and offering resource materials on religious leadership skills". The conference serves as a resource both to its members and to the public who may be seeking resources on leadership for religious life.

== See also ==
- Catholic Church in the United States
- History of nursing in the United States
- Sisters of Charity Federation in the Vincentian-Setonian Tradition
- Leadership Conference of Women Religious
- National Coalition of American Nuns
- Council of Major Superiors of Women Religious

== Notes ==
Council of Major Superiors of Women Religiou, http://www.cmswr.org, more recently founded.
