= John Gilmary Shea =

American historian (1824–1892)

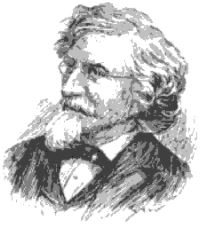
- Born: John Dawson Shea; July 22, 1824; New York City, U.S.
- Died: February 22, 1892 (aged 67); Elizabeth, New Jersey, U.S.
- Education: St. John's College
- Occupations: Writer, historian
- Spouse: Sophie Savage (m. 1854)

John Dawson Gilmary Shea (July 22, 1824 – February 22, 1892) was an American writer, editor, and historian of American history in general and American Catholic history specifically. He was also a leading authority on aboriginal native Americans in the United States. He is regarded as the "Father of American Catholic History".

== Biography ==
John Dawson Shea was born in New York City to James Shea, an Irish immigrant and school principal, and Mary Ann (Flannigan) Shea. His early studies were at the grammar school of Columbia College, where his father was principal. At an early age he became a clerk in a Spanish merchant's office, where he learned to read and write Spanish fluently. Shea graduated from St. John's College, now Fordham University, and entered the Society of Jesus in 1844; during this time he added his middle name of Gilmary ("servant of Mary"). He studied law, was admitted to the bar in 1846, and obtained the degree of LL.D. from St. John's College.

In 1852, he left the Jesuits. His comprehensive study of early Indian missions in America, the Discovery and Exploration of the Mississippi Valley with the original narratives of Marquette, Allouez, Membré, Hennepin and Anastase Douay, was published later that year. In 1854 he married Sophie Savage.

Shea turned his attention to literature, and was connected in an editorial capacity with Frank Leslie's publishing house, and later edited the Catholic News, but for many years his attention was given to historical research in preparation of his History of the Catholic Church in the United States (1886–92), the fourth volume of which was in process of publication at the time of his death in Elizabeth, New Jersey. A major research interest was French colonization and Jesuit missions in America. He edited the Historical Magazine from 1859 until 1865. In 1889 he became an editor of the Catholic News which supported him until his death.

Shea was connected with many historical societies in America and Europe, and was the first president of the Catholic Historical Society of the United States. He was the first person to be awarded the Laetare Medal by the University of Notre Dame in 1883. Georgetown University conferred on him the degree of LL.D. in recognition of his work as a Catholic historian. The John Gilmary Shea Papers, a collection of correspondence, manuscripts, and research materials, are preserved in the Georgetown University Library (Special Collections Division).

John Gilmary Shea died at his home in Elizabeth, New Jersey on February 22, 1892.

In 1945 the John Gilmary Shea Prize was established by the American Catholic Historical Association for the most original and distinguished contribution to the knowledge of the history of the Roman Catholic Church. Shea was inducted into the Fordham University Hall of Honor in 2008.

== Works ==
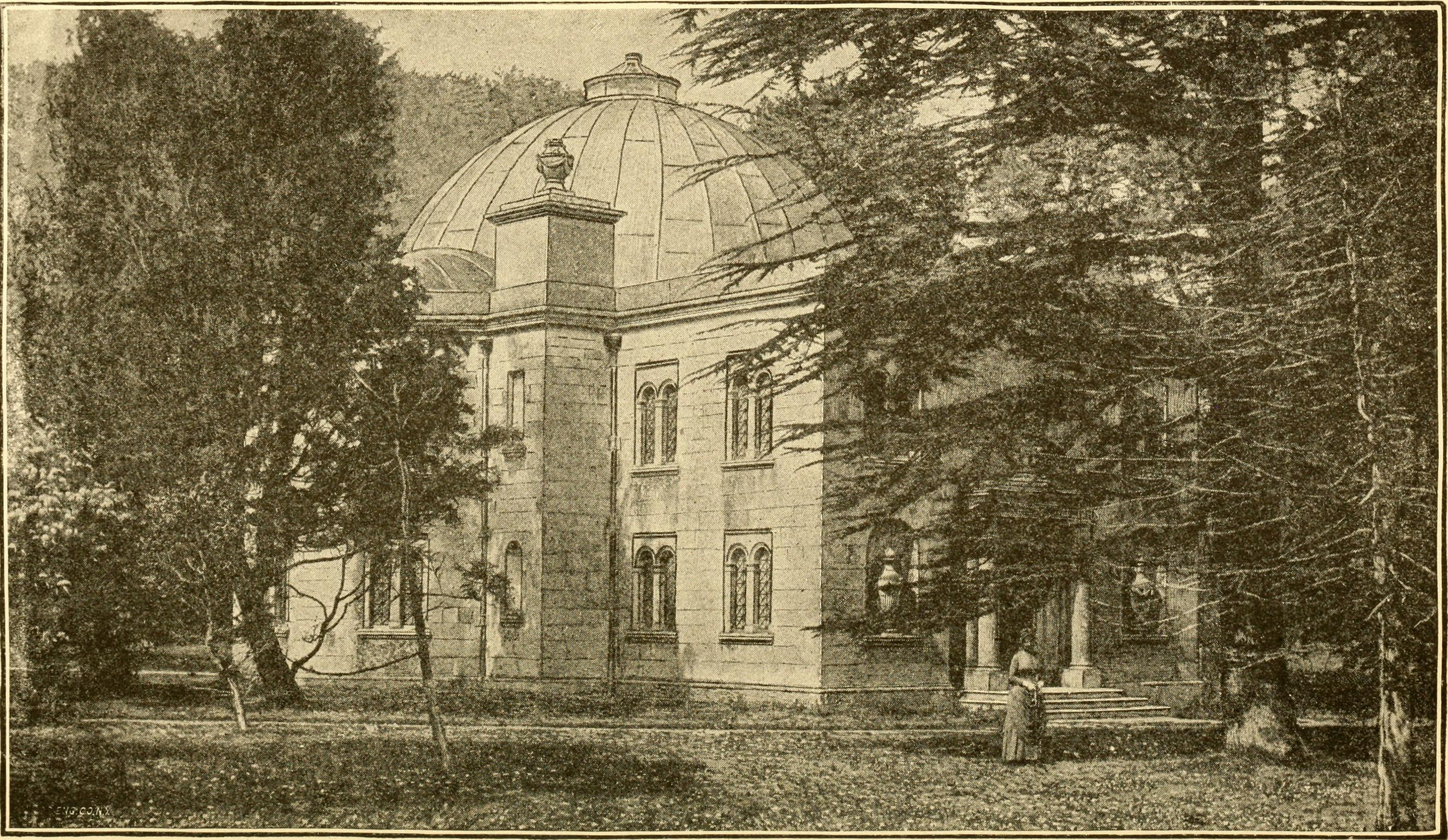
History of the Catholic Church in the United States (1886)

Shea was author, editor or translator of more than 240 publications.

=== Authored ===
- Discovery and Exploration of the Mississippi Valley with the original narratives of Marquette, Allouez, Membré, Hennepin and Anastase Douay (New York, 1852) read online
- History of the Catholic Missions among the Indian Tribes of the United States, 1529–1854 (1854; German translation, Würzburg, 1856) read online
- Perils of the Ocean and Wilderness, or, Narratives of Shipwreck and Indian Captivity : gleaned from early missionary annals (1856) read online
- A Bibliographical Account of American Catholic Bibles, Testaments, and Other Portions of Scripture (New York, 1859) read online
- A French-Onondaga Dictionary from a manuscript of the seventeenth century (1860) read online
- The Fallen Brave: A Biographical Memorial of The American Officers Who Have Given Their Lives for the Preservation of the Union (New York: Charles B. Richrdson, 1861) read online
- Early Voyages Up and Down the Mississippi by Cavelier, St. Cosme, Le Sueur, Gravier, and Guignas (Albany, 1861) read online
- The Operations of the French Fleet under the Count de Grasse in 1781–2 : as described in two contemporaneous journals (1864) read online
- The Lincoln Memorial (1865) read online
- The Commodities of the iland called Manati ore Long Ile which is in the continent of Virginia (1865) read online
- A Child's History of the United States (1872) read online
- The Life of Pope Pius IX and the Great Events in the History of the Church during his Pontificate (New York, 1875) read online
- Address Delivered before the Missouri Historical Society, July 19, 1878 : The Anniversary of the Discovery of the Mississippi by Marquette and Joliet (New York: H.J. Hewitt, 1878) read online
- The Bursting of Pierre Margry's La Salle Bubble : To refute Margry's claim that La Salle was the first French discoverer of the Mississippi, by critical examination of certain documents printed in "Découvertes et établissements des Français." (New York, 1879) read online
- Bibliography of Hennepin's Works (New York, 1880) read online
- The Expedition of Don Diégo Dionisio de Peñalosa, Governor of New Mexico, from Santa Fe to the river Mischipi and Quivira in 1662 (1882) read online
- The Catholic Church in Colonial Days : The Thirteen Colonies - the Ottawa and Illinois country - Louisiana-Florida-Texas-New Mexico and Arizona, 1521–1763 (1886) read online
- The Hierarchy of the Catholic Church in the United States : embracing sketches of all the archbishops and bishops from the establishment of the See of Baltimore to the present time : also, an account of the plenary councils of Baltimore, and brief history of the church in the United States (1886) read online
- Life and Times of the Most Rev. John Carroll, bishop and first archbishop of Baltimore : embracing the history of the Catholic Church in the United States, 1763–1815 (1888) read online
- History of the Catholic Church in the United States (4 vols., 1886–1892) read online
- The Defenders of Our Faith : their devotion to the church, biographies and portraits of our cardinals, archbishops, and bishops, setting forth their zeal and labor in the development of faith and morals, including an explanation of the doctrines of the church, a full account of the Plenary Council of Baltimore, the church in its history, teachings, trials and triumphs in America, profusely illustrated (New York, 1892) read online
- The cross and the flag, our church and country; heroic deeds ... (w/ Cardinal James Gibbons et al.) (1899) read online
- Caughnawaga and the Rev. Joseph Marcoux, its late missionary (New York, 18??) read online

=== Edited ===
- Cramoisy series of narratives and documents bearing on the early history of the French-American colonies (26 vols., 1857–1868)
- Washington's Private Diary (1861)
- Cadwallader Colden, History of the Five Indian Nations, edition of 1727 (1866)
- George Alsop (b. 1638), A Character of the Province of Maryland: described in four distinct parts; also a small treatise on the wild and naked Indians (or Susquehanokes) of Maryland ... together with a collection of historical letters (New York, 1869) read online
- Dictionnaire françois-onontagué / édité d'après un manuscit du 17e siècle par Jean-Marie Shea read online
- Little Pictorial Lives of the Saints : with reflections for every day in the year : compiled from "Butler's Lives" and other approved sources : to which are added lives of the American saints : placed on the calendar for the United States by special petition of the Third Plenary Council of Baltimore (New York, 1894) read online; 2015 e-book. Catholic Way Publishing. March 27, 2015. ISBN 978-1-78379-427-0. Shea, John Gilmary (2015). 2015 pbk edition. Catholic Way Publishing Company. ISBN 978-1-78379-426-3; 734 pages

=== Translated ===
- L. C. Businger (1832–1910) Christ in His Church : a Catholic Church history from the original of Rev. L. C. Businger / by Richard Brennan, together with a sketch of the church in America (New York, 1881) read online
- Pierre-Francois-Xavier de Charlevoix (1682–1761), History and General Description of New France (6 vols., 1866–1872) read online
- Henry de Courcy, Catholic Church in the United States (1856) read online
- Felipe Arroyo de la Cuesta (d. 1842), A vocabulary or phrase book of the Mutsun language of Alta California read online
- Nicholas de Freytas, The Expedition of Don Diego Dionisio de Penalosa in 1662 (New York, 1882) read online
- Father Louis Hennepin, A Description of Louisiana, by Father Louis Hennepin, Recollect missionary. Tr. from the edition of 1683, and compared with the Nouvelle découverte, the La Salle documents and other contemporaneous papers (1880) read online
- Isaac Jogues, Novum Belgium, An Account of the New Netherlands in 1643-4 (New York, 1862) read online
- Father Christian Le Clercq, First Establishment of the Faith in New France, by Father Christian Le Clercq, Recollect missionary (New York, 1881) read online
- Marie de Agustin de Tranchepain (d. 1733), Account of the Voyage of the Ursulines to New Orleans in 1727 (New York, 1859) read online

=== Shea’s library of American Linguistics ===
Shea published a series of grammars and dictionaries of Native American languages (15 vols., 1860–1874), the Library of American Linguistics, a series devoted to publishing grammars, dictionaries, and vocabularies of Indigenous languages of the Americas from rare printed books and manuscript sources. In an 1863 prospectus, Shea explained that his goal was to preserve missionary linguistic manuscripts that remained unpublished and were "liable to perish by accident." By that time the series had already issued works on the Onondaga, Selish (Flathead), Heve, Mutsun, Nevome, and Yakama languages, while additional volumes on the Sextapay, Micmac, Huron, Mohawk, Illinois, Montagnais, and other languages were announced as being in preparation. He also revised Challoner's original Bible of 1750 (1871).
