= Council of Major Superiors of Women Religious =

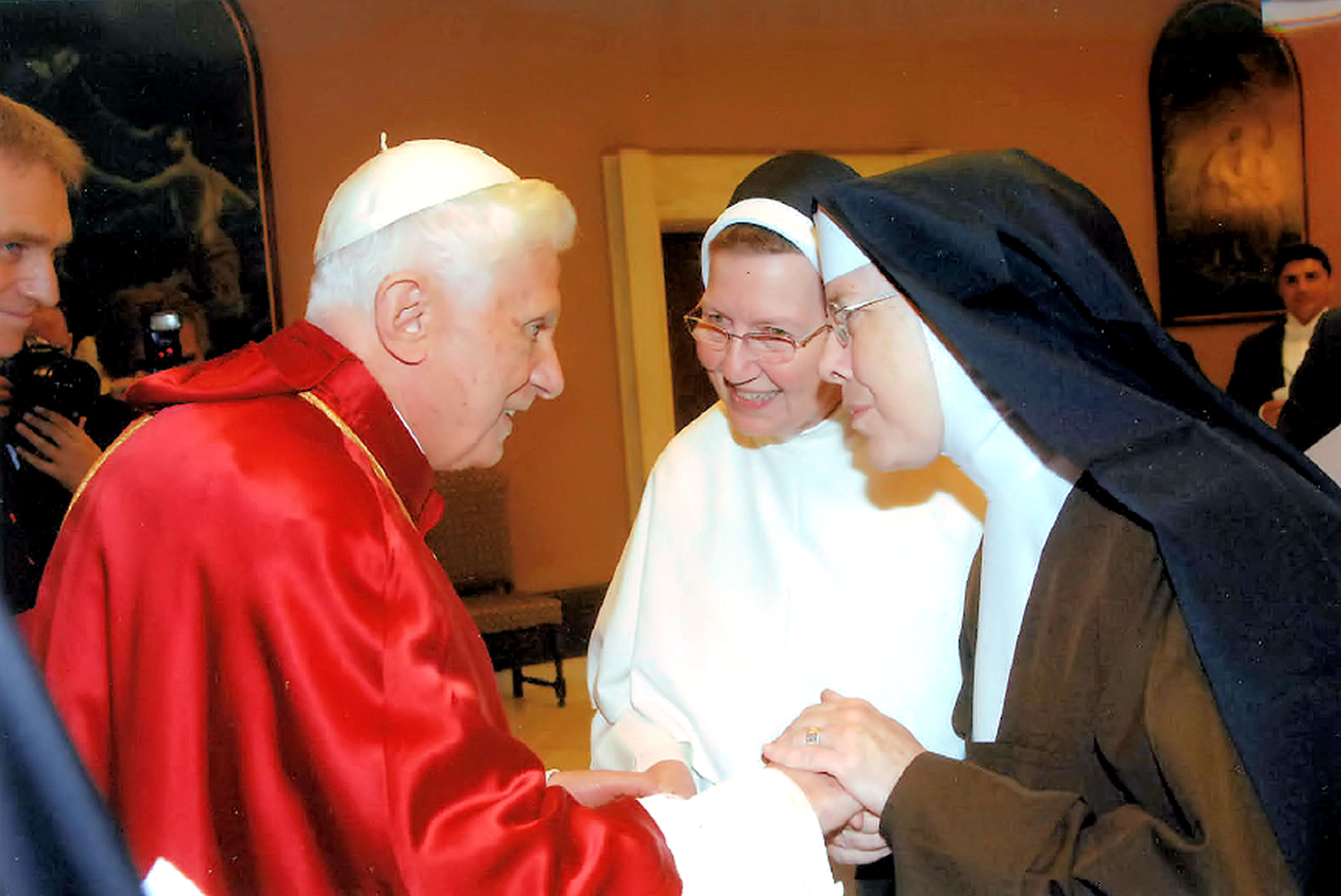
CMSWR Chairperson Sister Regina Marie Gorman in a Papal Audience with Pope Benedict XVI at the Apostolic Palace, Vatican City, Rome.

The Council of Major Superiors of Women Religious (Italian: Consiglio dei Superiori Maggiori delle Donne Religiose; CMSWR) is one of two associations of the leaders of congregations of Catholic women religious in the United States (the other being the Leadership Conference of Women Religious). It was founded in 1992. The Council "is composed of the major superiors and their vicars of 112 communities of women religious (approximately 5,700 sisters) in the United States."

== History ==
In the 1980s, several religious communities saw the Leadership Conference of Women Religious (LCWR), which had been established on December 12, 1959 under the name "Conference of Major Superiors of Women in the United States", as turning towards secular and political interests and as supporting dissent from the Church's teaching. They asked to be authorized to form a parallel association clearly loyal to the Magisterium. The Holy See granted their request on June 12, 1992, with provisional approval by the Holy See's Congregation for Institutes of Consecrated Life and Societies of Apostolic Life. It obtained definitive approval on 26 October 1995 under the pontificate of Pope John Paul II.

The council's purpose is to promote collaboration and inter-communication among its members, participation, dialogue and education about the teaching of the Catholic Church on the religious life, unity with the Pope and cooperation with the United States Conference of Catholic Bishops.

CMSWR is one of four United States federations of institutes of consecrated life and societies of apostolic life that have received approval from the Holy See, the others being the Conference of Major Superiors of Men, the LCWR, and the US Conference of Secular Institutes.

CMSWR members differ from those of the LCWR in having "major superiors" rather than "leaders" and in wearing recognizable religious habits. Their institutes have only 20% of the women religious of the United States, but they are younger, and growing in numbers. According to the 2009 Study on Recent Vocations by the Center for Applied Research in the Apostolate, the average median age of nuns and sisters in CMSWR institutes was 60, compared with 74 for those in LCWR; among those joining CMSWR institutes only 15% were over 40, compared with 56% for LCWR institutes; 43% of the CMSWR institutes had at least 5 novices, compared with 9% of the LCWR institutes.

In January 2009, the Congregation for Institutes of Consecrated Life and Societies of Apostolic Life announced it would conduct an apostolic visitation of American women religious to examine their quality of life, ministries, and vocation efforts. The congregation under the leadership of Cardinal Franc Rode, appointed Superior General Mother Mary Clare Millea to oversee the visitation. The council welcomed the visitation and encouraged members to cooperate fully. In October 2010, the council's chairperson Sister Regina Marie Gorman and former chairperson Sister Ann Marie Karlovic, O.P. met with Pope Benedict XVI at the Apostolic Palace in Rome.

In March 2012, the council celebrated their 20th founding anniversary and its board of directors met with Archbishop Salvatore Fisichella, president of the Pontifical Council for the Promotion of the New Evangelisation.

As of December 2020, CMSWR includes the leaders of 112 religious congregations which have a total membership of approximately 5,700 women religious in the United States (about 30%). As of 2020, the CMSWR Chairperson was Mother Mary McGreevy, RSM (superior general, Religious Sisters of Mercy). The Assistant Chairperson was Mother Anna Grace Neean, OP (prioress general, Dominican Sisters of St. Cecilia). The episcopal liaison, appointed by the Holy See, was Cardinal Justin Rigali.

== See also ==
- Catholic religious institute
- Vocational discernment in the Catholic Church
- Catholic sisters and nuns in the United States
