= Marie-Madeleine Hachard =

Ursuline missionary

Marie-Madeleine Hachard (17 February 1704, Rouen - 9 August 1760, New Orleans) was one of the first members of the first Ursuline Convent in New Orleans in French Louisiana in 1727. She is best known because of a printed correspondence addressed to her father that was published and attributed to her by the Rouen printer Antoine Le Prévost in 1728.

== Early life ==
Marie-Madeleine Hachard was the seventh child out of eleven children born to Jacques Hachard, and Marie-Anne Dumontier. Her parents married on June 5, 1695 in the parish of St. Nicaise. They moved to the parish of St. Maclou shortly after their fourth child was born in 1699. Jacques Hachard had served as a bailiff to the king (1695-1698), commissioner of tailles en élection de Rouen (1695-1698), and then procurator in the Cour des comptes, aides et finances de Normandie (1699-1711). Marie-Madeleine demonstrated a strong devotion as a child and took her first communion at the precocious age of ten. Her parents wanted her to marry and presented her with an advantageous match when she was eighteen. She refused the offer and began looking to join a religious community. She had two older sisters, Marie Anne and Elisabeth, who were professed nuns among the hospital nuns of St. Francis at the monastery of Saint-Elisabeth of Rouen. At the age of twenty, Marie-Madeleine began the process of joining this order. However, her confessor at the time deterred her from going through with her plan. Two years later, she joined the mission of the Ursulines to New Orleans, Louisiana.

== Mission to New Orleans ==
Marie-Madeleine learned about the Ursuline mission to New Orleans while its contract was still under negotiation. Two Ursulines from Rouen, Marie Tranchepain de St. Augustin and Marie Anne Le Boullenger de St. Angélique, had traveled to Paris in March 1726 to sign a contract with the French Company of the Indies (previously known as the Mississippi Company). However, due to complications, the contract was not signed until September 13, 1726. During this time, Marie-Madeleine presented herself to the Ursulines of Rouen requesting permission to join the mission. The Ursulines hesitated at first because the demands of establishing a mission were difficult enough for experienced nuns and she was not even a member of their order. The Ursulines were traditionally a teaching order, but they contracted with the Company of the Indies to run the military hospital in New Orleans, thus further complicating the mission. After examining Marie-Madeleine for three months "during which they neglected nothing in order to know her well" the Ursulines agreed to let her join the mission.

== Works ==
- De Rouen à la Louisiane : voyage d’une Ursuline en 1727, foreword by Jean-Pierre Chaline, Rouen, Association d'études normandes, Mont-Saint-Aignan, publications of the Université de Rouen, 1988 (ISBN 2902618948)
- "Une Rouennaise à La Nouvelle-Orléans au XVIIIe Siècle: Relation du voyage des Ursulines (1726-1728)", edited, annotated, and foreword by Chantal Théry, Laval, Les Presses de l'Université Laval, 2022.

== Sources ==
- Édouard Frère, Manuel du bibliographe normand, Rouen, Le Brument, 1860, p. 60
- Lebreton, Théodore-Éloi (1865). Biographie rouennaise (in French). Rouen: Le Brument. pp. 176–177.
- Emily Clark, Voices from an early American convent : Marie Madeleine Hachard and the New Orleans Ursulines, 1727 1760, Éd. Baton Rouge, Louisiana State University Press, 2007 (ISBN 0807132373)
- Jane Frances Heaney, O.S.U., A Century of Pioneering: A History of the Ursuline Nuns in New Orleans (1727-1827), New Orleans, The Ursuline Sisters of New Orleans, 1993. (ISBN 0963504401)
- Chantal Théry, « 1727-1728 De Rouen à La Nouvelle-Orléans. Correspondance et journal de bord de Marie-Madeleine Hachard de Saint-Stanislas », Femmes en toutes lettres : les épistolières du xviiie siècle, Éd. Marie-France Alberte Silver; Marie-Laure Girou-Swiderski, Oxford, Voltaire Foundation, 2000 (in French) (ISBN 9780729407410)
- Chantal Théry, De plume et d’audace. Femmes de la Nouvelle-France, Montréal / Paris, éditions Triptyque / éditions du Cerf, 2006, 262 p. (ISBN 9782890315693) Voir chap. 13 « De Rouen à La Nouvelle-Orléans : la relation de Marie-Madeleine Hachard »; chap. 14 : « Marie Tranchepain de Saint-Augustin ou l'art de la réplique » et textes en annexe. (in French)
