= History of the Ursulines in New Orleans =

The Ursulines have a long history in the city of New Orleans, Louisiana.

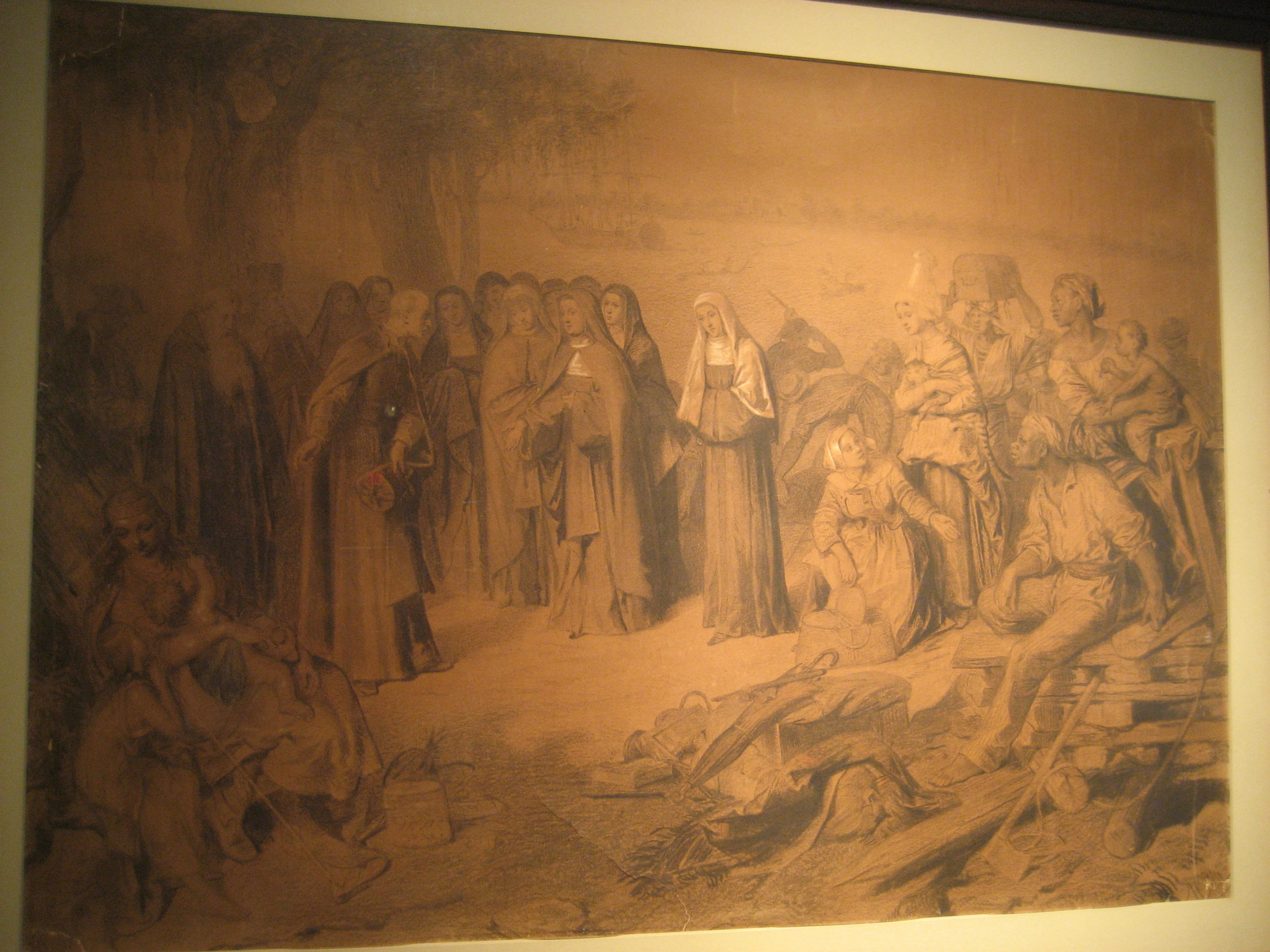
Arrival of the Ursulines in New Orleans, 1727 (19th century depiction)

As early as 1726, King Louis XV of France decided that three Ursuline nuns from Rouen should go to New Orleans to establish a hospital for poor sick people and to provide education for young girls of wealthy families.

== Arrival ==
At the request of Governor Étienne Perier, fourteen nuns took part in the long journey to New Orleans. The names of seven are known:

- Sister Saint-Augustin (Marie Tranchepain, the mother superior),
- Sister Angélique (Marie le Boullanger),
- Dame Jude, all from Rouen;
- Mother François-Xavier from le Havre, and
- Madame Cavelier from Elbeuf.

There were two postulant sisters: Sister le Massif from Tours and Marie-Madeleine Hachard from Rouen.

There were also two nuns from Ploërmel and one from Hennebont in Brittany.

Marie-Madeleine Hachard described their travel and their arrival at New Orleans in letters sent to her father who stayed in Rouen, and were published in 1728 by Antoine le Prévost from the same city. The trip lasted for five months, instead of three. They arrived at New Orleans in July 1727, and were temporarily housed in one of the larger houses of the young city.

== Work ==
Convinced that the education of women was essential to the development of a civilized, spiritual, and just society, the Ursuline sisters influenced culture and learning in New Orleans by providing an exceptional education for girls and women. They founded the Ursuline Academy in 1727. It was the first boarding school in Louisiana, educating a number of Catholic Hispanic girls and women from socially privileged families in central and South American countries. During the War of 1812 the Ursulines turned the classrooms into infirmaries for the sick and wounded of both the British and American armies. It is one of three academies sponsored by the Ursuline Sisters of the Roman Union, Central Province. The Ursulines also began the first school of music in New Orleans.

The Ursulines established an orphanage in the convent and one of the first hospitals in New Orleans. They worked in health care, and treated malaria and yellow fever among the slave population. The hospital usually had from thirty to forty patients, most of them soldiers. The first pharmacist in the United States was an Ursuline woman, Sister Francis Xavier, who practiced in New Orleans in the early 1700s.

== Ursuline Convent ==
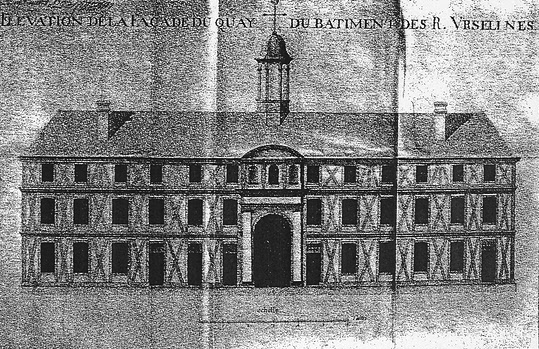
First Ursuline Convent, New Orleans, 1734

In 1734 their first building, the three-story half-timber structure, was completed. The unprotected timbers of the colombage construction, however, proved impractical in the humid semi-tropical climate of south Louisiana, with deterioration apparent a dozen years after the building was completed.

In 1745 plans for a new building were laid out, to be constructed adjacent to the existing structure. The first convent was dismantled as the newer one was built, with some of the material reused. This second building was completed in 1751.

It was designated a National Historic Landmark in 1966.

The nuns moved to the Ursuline Convent in the 9th Ward of New Orleans in 1823, giving the old French Quarter structure to the city's bishop. The convent premises in the 9th Ward were in turn sold to the city in the 1910s, and the land was used as part of the route for the Industrial Canal. The nuns moved to newer quarters on Nashville Avenue in Uptown New Orleans, where they are still located.

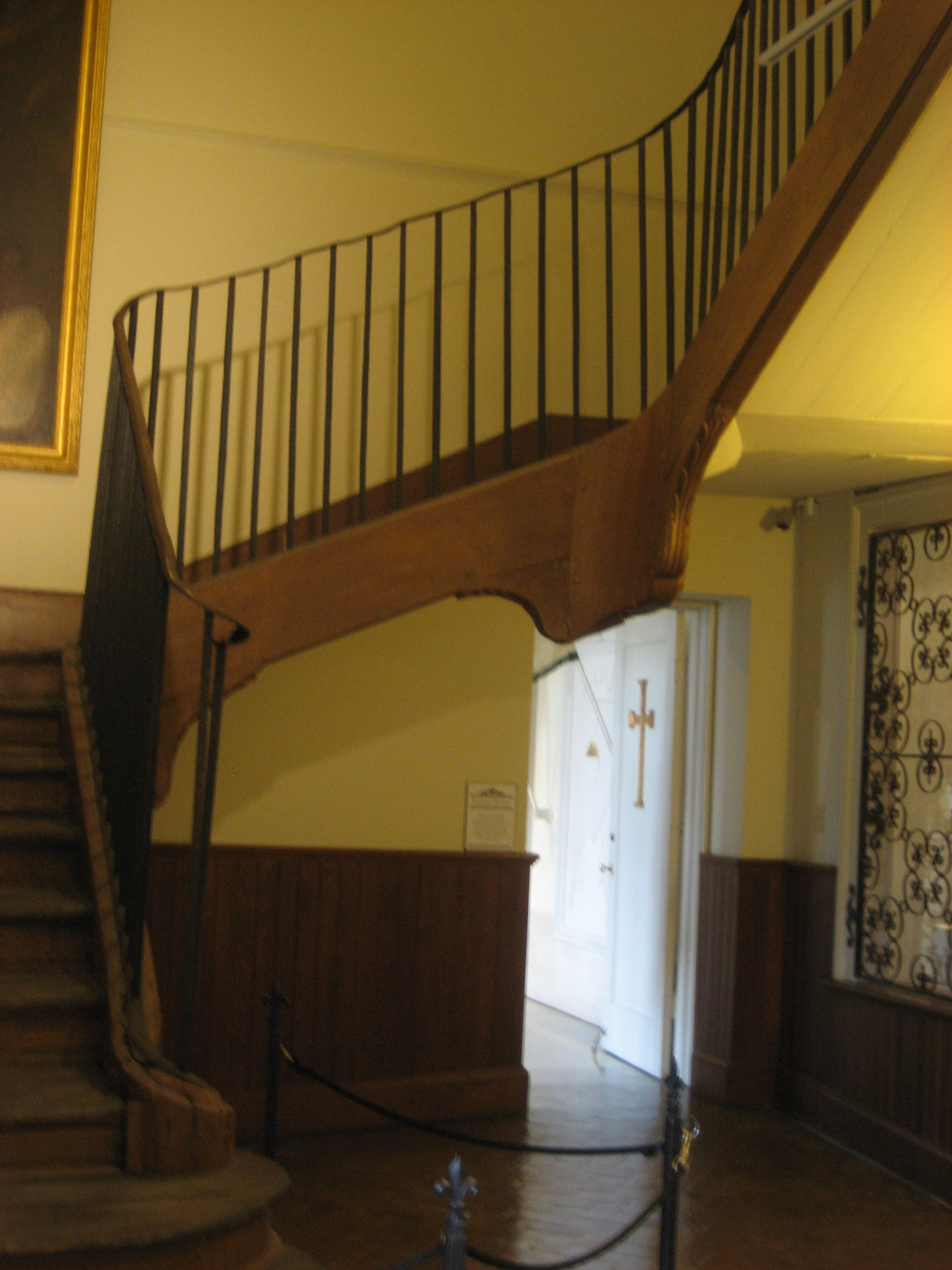
This staircase in the 2nd Ursuline Convent, in the French Quarter, was salvaged from the earlier First building.

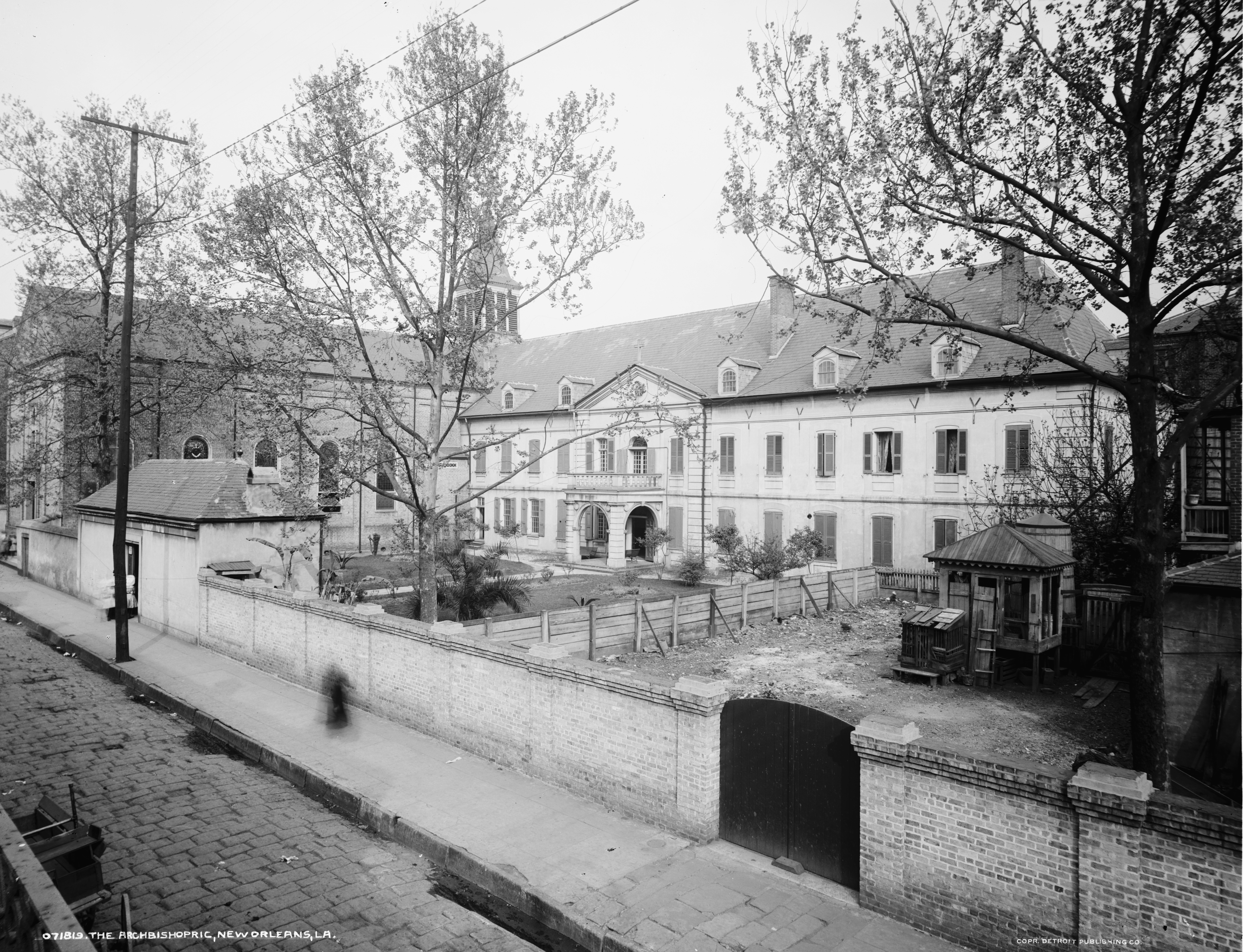
Old Ursuline Convent in the French Quarter while it was the Archbishop's Palace

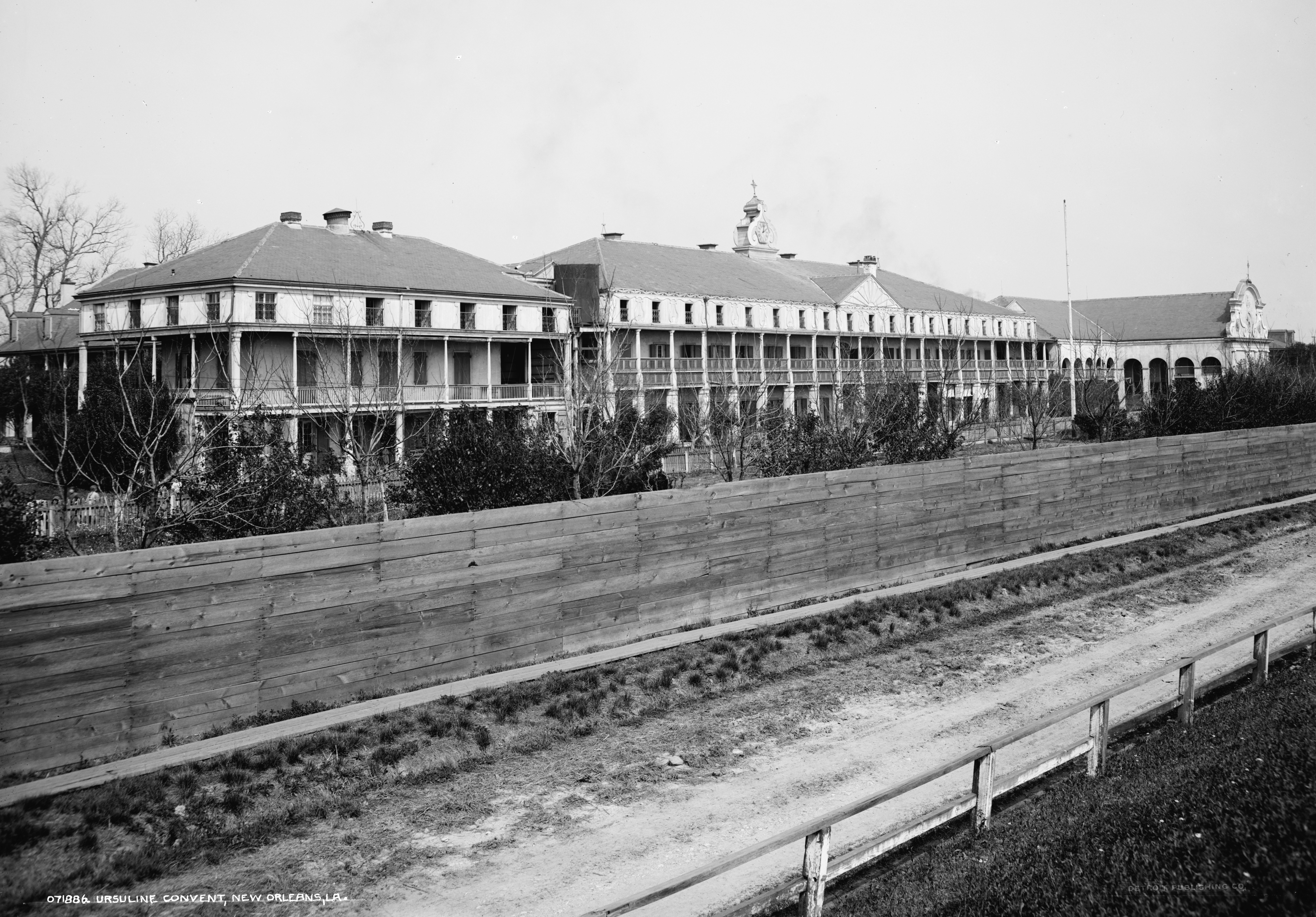
Part of the 3rd Ursuline Convent complex, 9th Ward, at the start of the 20th century

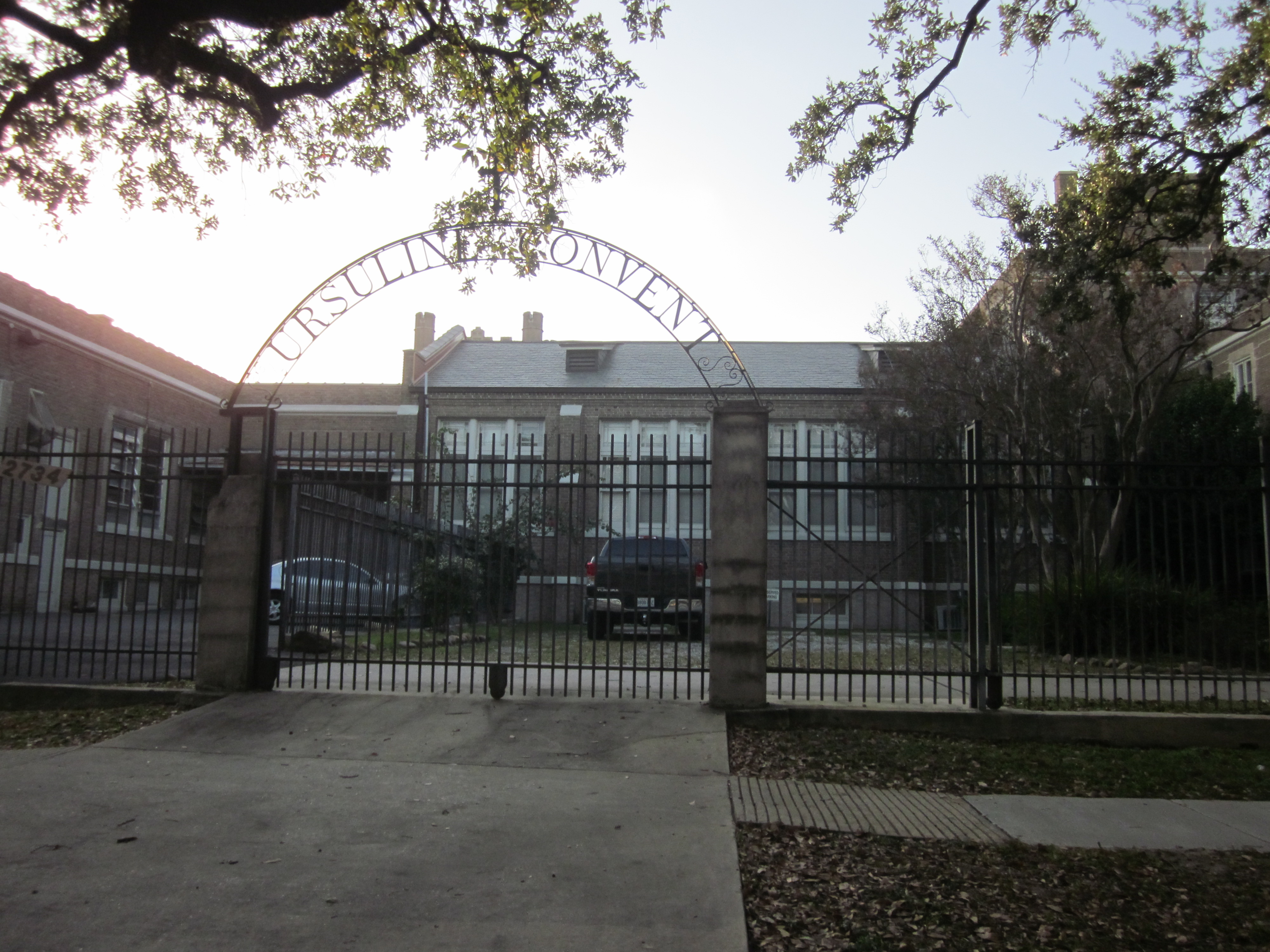
4th Ursuline Convent, Uptown New Orleans

== See also ==
- Ursulines in North America
- Old Ursuline Convent, New Orleans
- Ursuline Academy (New Orleans, Louisiana)
