= Old Ursuline Convent, New Orleans =

- U.S. National Register of Historic Places
- U.S. National Historic Landmark
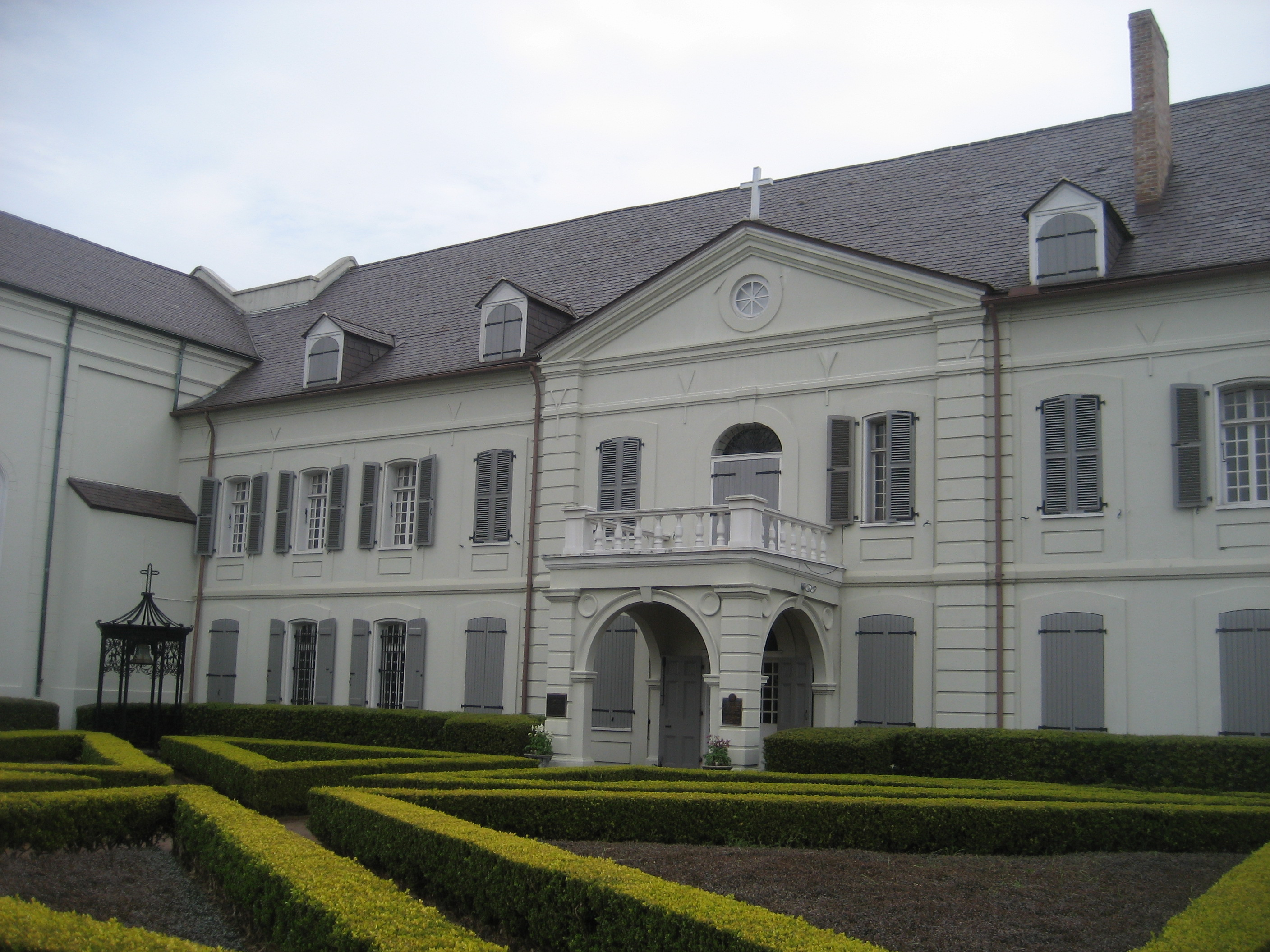
- Northwest façade of the Old Ursuline Convent

- Location within East New Orleans Location within Louisiana Location within the United States
- Location: 1100 Chartres St., New Orleans, Louisiana
- Coordinates: 29°57′37.1″N 90°3′38.51″W
- Built: 1751 (first building completed in 1734)
- Architect: Ignace Broutin, Alexandre de Batz
- Architectural style: Neoclassical, French Colonial
- Website: Old Ursuline Convent
- NRHP reference No.: 66000376

Significant dates
- Added to NRHP: October 15, 1966
- Designated NHL: October 9, 1960

Ursuline Convent (French: Couvent des Ursulines) was a series of historic Ursuline convents in New Orleans, Louisiana, United States. In 1727, at the request of Governor Étienne Perier, nuns from the Ursuline Convent of Rouen (Normandy) went to New Orleans to found a convent, run a hospital, and take care of educating young girls.

== First building ==
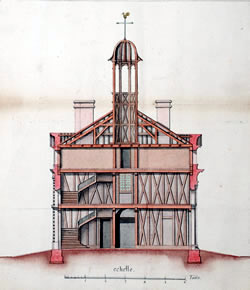
A 1733 elevation of the first building

The first building for the Ursuline nuns in New Orleans was designed by Ignace François Broutin in 1727 when the nuns arrived in New Orleans, at the request of Governor Étienne Perier. Michael Zeringue (Johann Michael Zehringer), the King's Master Carpenter from Franconia, Bavaria and progenitor of all "Zeringue" families in Louisiana was the builder. Planning, collecting material, and construction took years. Existing drawings show the building in 1733, although it was not officially finished until the following year.

Colombage (half-timbered) or briquette-entre-poteaux (brick-between-post) was the major form of French Colonial construction in the colony during the 18th century (see also Pitot House). Usually the exterior walls were then given a protective covering of stucco or wooden boards; but the fact that the timbered walls of the Ursuline Convent were left exposed is confirmed by a drawing from 1737. Such construction proved to be inappropriate for the humid climate of New Orleans (with significant deterioration already apparent by 1745), in addition to being a fire hazard.

== Second building ==
In 1745, plans for a new building of brick and protected colombage were prepared by Broutin. The contractor was Claude Joseph Villars Dubreuil, Contractor of Public Works for the King. His wife, Marie Payen de Noyan, was Bienville's niece. This new convent was completed by 1753. It is likely that Alexandre de Batz also took part in the design because several payments are listed to him for work on the new building. The second convent was laid out adjacent to the site of its predecessor, whose materials were partly recycled. In its original configuration, the building's front façade was that facing the Mississippi River; the Chartres Street entrance was located at the back of the building.

Built of stucco-covered brick, the present-day Old Ursuline Convent is typical for the French neoclassical architecture. It is a formal, symmetrical building, severely designed in its lack of ornamentation. No applied orders of pilasters or columns relieved the plain walls. Only the slightly arched window set in shallow moldings, the rusticated quoins at the corners and narrow central pedimented pavilion break the even rhythm of the fenestration. The broad plain hipped roof, broken only by small low-set dormers contrasts well with the multi-windowed façade and completes the austere but not unpleasant, finely proportioned building.

The ground floor was used largely for the dormitory, classrooms, refectory, and infirmary of the orphanage, maintained by the nuns. The second floor contained cells for the nuns, a library, (another) infirmary, and storerooms. Believed to have been salvaged from the original 1730s convent, a winding cypress staircase with wrought iron handrail occupies part of the ground floor entry hall.

=== Details ===
"This is the finest surviving example of French colonial public architecture in the country," states the National Park Service. It is by some accounts the oldest structure in New Orleans, built between 1748 and 1752. It was declared a National Historic Landmark in 1960. The convent and its associated school, Ursuline Academy, moved downriver to a site on Dauphine Street in the 9th Ward in 1824, turning over the original convent to the bishop of New Orleans, Louis William Valentine DuBourg. It was referred to as the "Archbishop's Palace" following New Orleans's elevation to an archdiocese. In 1912, the convent moved uptown to State Street.

=== Later additions ===
The entrance portico was added after the bishop had taken residence. The construction of a gatehouse around 1825–1830 reoriented the building by repositioning the main entrance from the river side to Chartres Street. The Ursuline property covered two city squares, extending to Royal Street. An old ground plan shows a chapel at the corner of Ursulines and Decatur Streets, dedicated to Our Lady of Victory. Near the entrance to the grounds, along the levee, were also a reception house for visitors, the day school, and a residence for the chaplain. Between these buildings and the convent were gardens. To the right, moving up from the riverside entrance, were the hospital buildings, and beyond them military barracks.

Despite great interior alterations and decay, the Convent is considered one of the most important historical and religious landmarks in the United States and is one of the few remaining physical links with the French colonial period in Louisiana.

== See also ==
- French Colonial architecture
- History of the Ursulines in New Orleans
- Ursuline Academy (New Orleans)
- List of National Historic Landmarks in Louisiana
- List of the oldest buildings in Louisiana
- National Register of Historic Places listings in Orleans Parish, Louisiana

== Bibliography ==
- CLARK Emily, Voices from an early American convent : Marie Madeleine Hachard and the New Orleans Ursulines, 1727 1760, Baton Rouge Editions, Louisiana State University Press, 2007
