= Mary Clare Millea =

Mother Mary Clare Millea was the superior general of the Catholic Apostles of the Sacred Heart of Jesus (from 2004 to 2016).

== Early life and education ==
Mary Clare Millea, a native of Connecticut, United States, entered the Apostles of the Sacred Heart of Jesus in 1965.

She obtained a BS in Psychology at Seton Hill College (Greensburg, PA), M.S.Ed., a certificate of advanced graduate study in School Psychology at Duquesne University (Pittsburgh, PA), and a Doctorate in Canon Law at Lateran University, Rome.

== Personal life ==
Millea was fluent in English, Italian and Portuguese with some understanding of French and Spanish.

== Experience ==
- Special Education Teacher
- School Psychologist
- School Principal
- Local superior and provincial superior in the United States Province
- Member of the General Council of Apostles of the Sacred Heart of Jesus in Rome, Italy for 18 years
- Elected Superior General of the Apostles of the Sacred Heart in 2004
- Observer for the XII Assembly of the Synod of Bishops on the Word of God in 2008

== Apostolic Visit ==
In 2009 Millea became the apostolic visitor for the Vatican and headed a three-year investigation into the USA's 50,000 nuns. The three-year Vatican investigation was ordered amid growing concern in the Catholic church over what was seen as excessive feminism and secularism among US nuns. The inquiry affected almost 400 institutes of “women religious”.

The visitation led to an official Vatican reprimand of the Leadership Conference of Women Religious (LCWR), which censured them for spending too much time helping the poor while being “silent on the right to life” and Vatican teaching on marriage and sexuality.

Overall, the visitation’s final report called for American nuns to “carefully review their spiritual practices and ministry to assure that these are in harmony with Catholic teaching about God, creation, the incarnation and the redemption,” and called for greater dialogue. Millea officially thanked Cardinal João Braz de Aviz “for responding to us with sensitivity, respect and clarity”.

== Further Notes ==
Mother Miriam Cunha Sobrinha of Brazil succeeded Millea as Superior General in 2016.
