= Leadership Conference of Women Religious =

US Roman Catholic association

- Formation: November 1956; 69 years ago
- Founded at: Chicago, Illinois, United States
- Website: https://www.lcwr.org/

The Leadership Conference of Women Religious (LCWR) is one of two associations of the leaders of congregations of Catholic women religious in the United States (the other being the Council of Major Superiors of Women Religious). In 2025 LCWR includes "nearly 1270 members, who represent approximately 66 percent of the 35,000 women religious in the United States" (i.e. approximately 23,100 women religious). Its members belong to 288 religious congregations in the United States as of 2025.

Founded in 1956, the conference describes its charter as assisting its members to "collaboratively carry out their service of leadership to further the mission of the Gospel in today's world." The canonically-approved organization collaborates in the Catholic Church and in society to "influence systemic change, studying significant trends and issues within the church and society, utilizing our corporate voice in solidarity with people who experience any form of violence or oppression, and creating and offering resource materials on religious leadership skills." The conference serves as a resource both to its members and to the public who are seeking resources on leadership for religious life.

In April 2015 the Vatican closed a controversial, multi-year investigation initiated in 2012 by Cardinal Gerhard Müller of the Congregation for the Doctrine of the Faith. According to Associated Press' Vatican correspondent, Nicole Winfield, the investigation "embittered many American Catholics against what they perceive as heavy-handed tactics by Rome." While Pope Francis, elected after the investigation began, reaffirmed it and the organization's members were ordered to review their statutes and reassess their plans and programs, the Holy See in its conclusion praised the nuns' work.

== Mission and purpose ==
According to its official website, the LCWR serves as a resource to its members and to others seeking information on leadership for religious life and living religious life. Its mission is to "promote a developing understanding and living of religious life by":

- "Assisting its members personally and communally to carry out more collaboratively their service of leadership in order to accomplish further the mission of Christ in today's world."
- "Fostering dialogue and collaboration among religious congregations within the church and in the larger society."
- "Developing models for initiating and strengthening relationships with groups concerned with the needs of society, thereby maximizing the potential of the conference for effecting change."

== Members of LCWR congregations ==
The membership of the LCWR is composed of women who are the superiors, or leaders, of their respective congregations. In 2019, congregations led by LCWR members included 32,475 members "nearly 80% of the approximately 38,000 women religious in the United States".

Year	Members of LCWR Congregations
2007	60,642
2010	47,872
2011	46,289
2012	44,637
2013	42,335
2014	41,014
2015	39,085
2016	37,418
2017	36,555
2018	33,431
2019	32,475
2025	23,100

In 2009 the average median age of women in final/perpetual vows in LCWR member congregations was 74 (compared to 60 in CMSWR member institutes). Among those who entered since 1994, 56% were over 30 by 2009.

A 2009 survey by the Center for Applied Research in the Apostolate showed that 78 percent of women who joined CMSWR organizations were under 30, compared to 35 percent of those who joined LCWR organizations. According to Mary Johnson, Patricia Wittberg, and Mary Gautier, in New Generations of Catholic Sisters (2014):

Some commentators, for ideological purposes, attempt to create generalized typologies that mask the complexity of the religious reality, arguing that all new entrants go to traditionalist (CMSWR [Council of Major Superiors of Women Religious]) institutes and few or none go to LCWR [Leadership Conference of Women Religious] institutes. ... The reality of the situation is that almost an equal percentage of LCWR and CMSWR institutes have no one at all in formation at the present time (32 percent and 27 percent, respectively). One of the most striking findings regarding new entrants is that almost equal numbers of women have been attracted to institutes in both conferences in recent years.

This did not continue to hold true, however; by 2016, according to the Global Sisters Report, CMSWR grew in total numbers to nearly 6,000, while the LCWR continued to shrink at an accelerated rate; in addition, the CMSWR's number of novices and postulants continued to grow, standing at 900 in 2016.

== History ==
In April 1956 the Holy See's Congregation of the Affairs of Religious requested that nuns in the U.S. form a national conference. In November of that year, the committee of nuns in the U.S. called a meeting in Chicago of general and provincial superiors of pontifical communities to consider the formation of a national conference. They voted unanimously to establish the Conference of Major Superiors of Women (CMSW) to "promote the spiritual welfare" of the country's women religious, "insure increasing effectiveness of their apostolate," and "foster closer fraternal cooperation with all religious of the United States, the hierarchy, the clergy, and Catholic associations." Its Statutes were approved by the Sacred Congregation for Religious in 1962. The name was changed in 1971 to the Leadership Conference of Women Religious. Its revised Statutes were approved by the Congregation for Institutes of Consecrated Life and Societies of Apostolic Life (CICLSAL) in 1989. In 1992 the CICLSAL approved the establishment of the Council of Major Superiors of Women Religious (CMSWR), as an alternative superiors conference. (Note: The CMSWR has overlapping membership, whose 168 members of the level of provincial or general superiors represent some 20% of the country's women religious.) The LCWR contains a "Vatican II reformed" membership while the CMSWR contains a "more traditional or conservative" membership.

=== Doctrinal issues ===
In April 2015 the Vatican closed a controversial, multi-year investigation initiated in 2012 by Cardinal Gerhard Müller of the Congregation for the Doctrine of the Faith. Archbishop J. Peter Sartain of Seattle was appointed to work with the conference. According to Associated Press' Vatican correspondent, Nicole Winfield, the investigation "embittered many American Catholics against what they perceive as heavy-handed tactics by Rome."

While Pope Francis, elected after the investigation began, reaffirmed it and the organization's members were ordered to review their statutes and reassess their plans and programs, the Holy See in its conclusion praised the nuns' work. The joint final report of both the Vatican and the LCWR stated that the conference is "a public juridic person centered on Jesus Christ and faithful to the teachings of the Church," its publications "need a sound doctrinal foundation," and "when exploring contemporary issues, particularly those which, while not explicitly theological nevertheless touch upon faith and morals, LCWR expects speakers and presenters to have due regard for the Church's faith".

==== Women's ordination ====
On October 7, 1979, Theresa Kane, former president of the LCWR, issued a formal plea during Pope John Paul II's Apostolic visit to the United States at the National Shrine of the Immaculate Conception for "providing the possibility of women as persons being included in all ministries of the church." According to Franciscan Florence Deacon, someone doing the doctrinal assessment in 2012 may have been concerned with a statement made 35 years earlier in 1977 which was in favor of women's ordination, which the LCWR had never withdrawn.

==== "Moved beyond Jesus" ====
On August 2, 2007, Laurie Brink during her keynote address quoted another sister's comment that stated, "I was rooted in the story of Jesus, and it remains at my core, but I've also moved beyond Jesus," going on to explain that religious traditions outside the Christian fold may also have something to teach us, and are deserving of respect.

==== Apostolic visitation ====
LCWR representatives were asked by the CDF in 2001 "to report on LCWR members' reception of Church teaching on the sacramental priesthood, the CDF document Dominus Iesus, and 'the problem of homosexuality'." The CDF looked at "the doctrinal content of various addresses" at the LCWR annual assemblies and decided "that the problems which had motivated its request in 2001" remained.

On December 22, 2008, Franc Rodé, prefect of the CICLSAL announced it would conduct an apostolic visitation of U.S. women religious to examine their quality of life, ministries, vocation efforts, and financial status, which many saw as indictment against some of the less traditional communities within the LCWR by "seeking answers about 'the soundness of doctrine held and taught'." Mary Clare Millea, superior general of the Apostles of the Sacred Heart of Jesus, was appointed as the Apostolic Visitator. LCWR said that the Holy See had not fully disclosed the reasons behind the investigation, nor its funding.

Raymond Burke, then prefect of the Supreme Tribunal of the Apostolic Signatura, declared on a televised interview that "the question is now for conversion to the true nature of religious life" and if the LCWR "cannot be reformed, then it does not have a right to continue." (Note: LCWR is a conference of major superiors that is a juridic person governed under canons 708 and 709 of the 1983 Code of Canon Law of the Latin Church of the Catholic Church.)

==== CDF Investigation ====
On April 8, 2008, William Levada, prefect of the Congregation for the Doctrine of the Faith under Pope Benedict XVI, met with LCWR leaders in Rome and communicated that the CDF will conduct a doctrinal assessment of the LCWR. The doctrinal assessment would evaluate three "major areas of concern":

1. Addresses at the LCWR assemblies that "manifest problematic statements and serious theological, even doctrinal errors" and call into question "core Catholic beliefs" in ways which are both "a rejection of faith" and "a serious source of scandal and is incompatible with religious life."
2. Policies of dissent "regarding the question of women's ordination and of a correct pastoral approach to ministry to homosexual persons," such as "letters about New Ways Ministry's conferences" that "suggest that these sisters collectively take a position not in agreement with the Church's teaching on human sexuality."
3. The "prevalence of certain radical feminist themes incompatible with the Catholic faith ... including theological interpretations that risk distorting faith in Jesus and his loving Father," commentaries that "distort the way in which Jesus has structured sacramental life in the Church," and other commentaries that "undermine the revealed doctrines of the Holy Trinity, the divinity of Christ, and the inspiration of Sacred Scripture."

According to Laurie Goodstein, the controversial investigation, which was viewed by many U.S. Catholics as a "vexing and unjust inquisition of the sisters who ran the church's schools, hospitals and charities," was quietly closed in 2015 after a delegation from the conference met with Pope Francis.

==== CDF doctrinal assessment of the LCWR ====
From 2009 to 2012 the Congregation for the Doctrine of the Faith (CDF) conducted a doctrinal assessment of the LCWR. In April 2012, the CDF "announced a major reform of the LCWR" and described "the need to remedy significant doctrinal problems associated with the group's activities and programs ... in areas including abortion, euthanasia, women's ordination and homosexuality."

At the beginning of the investigation, the CDF delegated oversight of its doctrinal assessment to Leonard Paul Blair, bishop of Toledo. Blair submitted reports to the CDF and engaged in correspondence with the LCWR during 2009 and 2010. Documentation of the doctrinal assessment was submitted to the CDF in January, 2011. The CDF recommended reforming the LCWR; and Benedict XVI approved the decision. After the doctrinal assessment submitted its final report in December 2011, the CDF began reforming the LCWR.

==== CDF reform of the LCWR ====
In April 2012, the Congregation for the Doctrine of the Faith (CDF) released the doctrinal assessment findings and delegated oversight of its reform of the LCWR to Seattle Archbishop J. Peter Sartain. The CDF mandated reform of the LCWR to conform more closely to "the teachings and discipline of the Church." According to Cathy Lynn Grossman, the nuns "were stunned and dismayed" that the LCWR "was turned over to Sartain ... to revamp its management and programming."

===== CDF mandate =====
Sartain's CDF mandate as Delegate, for a period of up to five years, included:

1. Revision of LCWR Statutes to ensure greater clarity about the scope of the mission and responsibilities of this conference of major superiors. In 2014 those revised Statutes were submitted to the CICLSAL and approved in 2015.
2. Review of LCWR plans and programs, including General Assemblies and publications, to ensure that the scope of the LCWR's mission is fulfilled in accord with Church teachings and discipline. In particular:
  - Withdrawal of Systems Thinking Handbook from circulation pending revision
  - Reform of LCWR programs for future Superiors and Formators
  - Approval of speakers/presenters at major programs
3. Creation of new LCWR programs, for member Congregations, for the development of initial and ongoing formation material that provides a deepened understanding of the Church's doctrine of the faith.
4. Review and guidance in the application of liturgical norms and texts, including placing a priority on the Eucharist and the Liturgy of the Hours in LCWR events and programs.
5. Review of LCWR links with affiliated organizations, including NETWORK and Resource Center for Religious Life.

===== Initial response by LCWR leaders =====
After a June 12, 2012, meeting with representatives of LCWR, Levada expressed his fear that the lack of response to Vatican concerns by the LCWR was becoming like a "dialogue of the deaf". He presented the possibility that if the LCWR did not accept the demanded reforms that they could be suppressed to make way for a new organization that would take up their duties and be more responsive to the Vatican. He rejected claims that Vatican actions were based on "unsubstantiated accusations", saying "In reality, this is not a surprise," the demand for reforms are based on "what happens in their assemblies, what's on their website, what they do or don't do." Patricia Farrell, president of LCWR, and Janet Mock, executive director of LCWR, stated that the group would consider its response in an upcoming regional meeting and an August 2012 national assembly and would make no further comment on the issue.

On August 10, 2012, Farrell, as former president of LCWR, gave a keynote address to LCWR members to be "truthful and fearless" with regards to the doctrinal assessment issued by the Vatican. Farrell said that "some larger movement in the church ... has landed on LCWR." In addition, Farrell distinguished between an expression of concern vs. an attempt to control. "Concern is based in love and invites unity. Control through fear and intimidation would be an abuse of power." In conclusion, Patricia noted, "They can crush a few flowers, but they cannot hold back the springtime," a saying derived from her service in Chile during its military dictatorship. In 2013, the LCWR awarded Farrell its highest honor for leadership "through an exceptionally challenging time."

On August 11, 2012, the LCWR postponed official reform of its statutes and by-laws; its leaders cited the need for further ecclesial dialogue with the Holy See about the continuance of the LCWR as an official canonical entity of the Catholic Church. According to Cathy Lynn Grossman, reporting for USA Today, "The assembly instructed the LCWR officers to conduct their conversation with Archbishop Sartain from a stance of deep prayer that values mutual respect, careful listening, and open dialogue. The officers will proceed with these discussions as long as possible, but will reconsider if LCWR is forced to compromise the integrity of its mission."

Mary Hughes, past president of the LCWR, indicated the group wanted to remain canonically approved by the Holy See. Hughes noted that the group is a leadership support group, not a "theological society".

In October 2012, when it was said in an interview that the LCWR did not speak out on abortion, contraception, and gay marriage, Florence Deacon responded that "Jesus welcomed sinners with the idea that they would be drawn to change their lives." According to Deacon, the LCWR opposed the Bush tax cuts because the Gospel encourages Catholics to create a world in which everyone has what they need so they can live as full human beings and develop their faith. To the suggestion that the CDF doctrinal assessment may have occurred because the sisters supported the Patient Protection and Affordable Care Act while the bishops were against that legislation, Deacon said that the doctrinal assessment "was started before that."

===== The LCWR position =====
After the June 2012 meeting with Levada, LCWR members "who say they have been unjustly criticised, returned to the US at the end of the talks to decide what to do next."

Simone Campbell of Network, a Catholic social justice lobbying group, called the CDF reform of the LCWR a political "censure" and that she was "concerned that Catholic sisters below the decision-making level are caught in the bigger picture of Vatican politics. We're sort of the soccer ball here. My most optimistic self had hoped that CDF report would never be mentioned again but in light of the broader politics, I think it was overly optimistic of me."

Citing the group's choice of futurist Barbara Marx Hubbard as the 2012 keynote speaker, Father Mitch Pacwa said that LCWR has had a New Age approach for some time.

In August 2014 the LCWR gave its yearly award to Elizabeth Johnson, a theologian who has written for general audiences. Her popular book on God was criticized by a committee of U.S. bishops. When Johnson slammed the Vatican investigation, saying "the waste of time on this investigation is unconscionable," the sisters in attendance gave her a standing ovation.

===== Closure =====
====== Final Report on the Leadership Conference on Women Religious ======
The Vatican, on April 16, 2015, "unexpectedly ended" the CDF "investigation and oversight of US nuns." A Joint Final Report on the Doctrinal Assessment of the Leadership Conference of Women Religious (LCWR) by the Congregation for the Doctrine of the Faith (CDF) was issued on April 16, 2015, by the officers of LCWR and the bishop delegates.

The joint report highlighted the following:

- Statutes: "the role of the Conference as a public juridic person centered on Jesus Christ and faithful to the teachings of the Church is to undertake through its membership and in collaboration with other sisters those services which develop the life and mission of women religious in responding to the Gospel in the contemporary world" (Statutes, Section 2). The revised Statutes were unanimously approved by the LCWR Assembly and then approved by the CDF.
- Publications and Programs: "publications need a sound doctrinal foundation. To this end, measures are being taken to promote a scholarly rigor that will ensure theological accuracy and help avoid statements that are ambiguous with regard to Church doctrine or could be read as contrary to it."
- Speakers: "When a topic explicitly addresses matters of faith, speakers are expected to employ the ecclesial language of faith. ... LCWR expects speakers and presenters to have due regard for the Church's faith and to pose questions for further reflection in a manner that suggests how faith might shed light on such issues."

It stated that the joint work between the CDF and the LCWF has "borne much fruit" and "The very fact of such substantive dialogue between bishops and religious has been a blessing to be appreciated and further encouraged."

===== Reactions =====
A delegation of American women religious met for almost an hour with Francis. "He met with them himself for almost an hour, and that's an extravagant amount of papal time," said Eileen Burke-Sullivan, a theologian, consultant and vice provost for mission and ministry at Creighton University, a Jesuit institution. "It's about as close to an apology, I would think, as the Catholic Church is officially going to render." Laurie Goodstein of The New York Times said that Francis's handling of the matter appeared to reflect that "he is less interested in having the church police doctrinal boundaries than in demonstrating mercy and love for the poor and vulnerable – the very work that most of the women's religious orders under investigation have long been engaged in." Cardinal Franc Rode, who initiated the investigation, had been replaced by Cardinal Joao Braz de Aviz of Brazil.

Sharon Holland said "We learned that what we hold in common is much greater than any of our differences." Müller said that the Vatican is certain that the LCWR is "fostering a vision of religious life that is centered on the Person of Jesus Christ and is rooted in the Tradition of the Church." Phil Lawler of catholicculture.org said that while Catholics should be able to take these things for granted, a Vatican intervention had been necessary in this case. He said that their statements do not guarantee that the Vatican intervention will prove successful, but that they do demonstrate that the process was necessary. When the conclusion was announced in April 2015, Christopher Bellitto, a church historian at Kean University, noted, "Anything coming out of the Vatican this morning is nothing other than a fig leaf because they can't say 'oops' in Latin."

The New York Times said the closure allowed Francis to settle a confrontation started by his predecessor that "created an uproar among American Catholics," who energetically defended the nuns in the face of Vatican interference, signing petitions and sending letters to the Vatican. Father James Martin, who wrote frequently about the conflict as an editor of the Jesuit magazine America, said: "What you see with the sisters is true courage, which is being faithful to the church authority and also to who they are." On April 17, 2015, the editorial board of The New York Times editorialized that, "The Vatican's misguided investigation of American Catholic nuns seemed thoroughly steeped in chauvinism from its inception three years ago by the church's male-dominated bureaucracy. Rome's move against widely respected churchwomen was puzzling and provocative in an era of scandal by male priests committing child rape and being repeatedly shielded by their male superiors. ... There was no mistaking the message that the reforming spirit of Francis's fresh broom had poked sharply into another corner of the Vatican. The extraordinary effort to have the Vatican take control of the sisters' main communal voice – the Leadership Conference of Women Religious – ended with none of the aggressive bombast of Rome's initial announcement of the inquiry under Francis's predecessor, Benedict XVI."

Phil Pullella, reporting from the Vatican, noted that while the nuns had made specific concessions, "Supporters said the nuns had helped the Church's image in America at a time when it was engulfed in scandal over sexual abuse of minors by priests. They were praised by many Roman Catholics and the media for their work with the poor and sick."

=== Haag Prize ===
In November 2012, the Haag Foundation awarded the LCWR with the 2013 Herbert Haag Prize in "recognition of its extensive efforts in helping the poor, the marginalized, and people in difficult circumstances" and "their careful reflection of the signs of the times in the spirit of the Second Vatican Council, making the nuns a pillar of the Catholic Church in the United States of America." The foundation also held that their efforts resulted in a situation where "women religious, and especially their leaders, stand in the eye of an ecclesiastical storm."

=== CBS: 60 Minutes interview ===
In March 2013, CBS News broadcast a 60 Minutes critique of the doctrinal assessment, and interview of Farrell and Sartain. Sartain described his role as follows: "In the context of the Church, we're always going to have the concern about being faithful to Christ. And all I can say to you ... is I don't have any doubt about the reason why the Holy Father has asked me to do this, which is his genuine love and concern for religious women."

On the other hand, Farrell noted that there is disagreement over the meaning of vows of obedience for nuns: "Well I think there is one of the areas of misunderstanding and difference. Our first obedience is to God. What we obey is God and God's call to us as expressed in so many different sources, it's not just the teaching authority of the Church, although that is certainly a legitimate part of it." "We have never wanted the men to tell us what to do."

She added that the motivation of the inquiry by men in the Vatican appeared to be motivated by their fears rather than the love and concern Sartain cited. Farrell commented: "I don't know, but it feels to me like fear. What would happen if women really were given a place of equality in the Church?"

The Holy See says "good works aren't the issue, its annual meetings" are the issue. "It doesn't make sense," Sartain reasoned about the speakers selected by the LCWR, "that a conference of Women Religious would want to give a platform to somebody who would espouse ideas antithetical to what the Church teaches."

=== Sexual abuse of nuns by clerics ===
Following the admission by Pope Francis that the Catholic Church was struggling with the issue of sexual abuse and rape of nuns by male priests and bishops, the LCWR issued a statement calling for an overhaul of the male-led leadership structure of the Catholic Church. The statement expressed the organization's gratitude that Pope Francis "shed light on a reality that has been largely hidden from the public and we believe his honesty is an important and significant step forward." The LCWR said that in order to regain its moral credibility and have a viable future, the church would need to create reliable reporting mechanisms and refashion the church's overall leadership structure by involving laity and changing the entrenched culture with all power in the hands of the clergy.

The statement expressed gratitude for the work of the International Union of Superiors General (UISG), the global Rome-based organization of the leaders of orders of Catholic sisters, in advocating for improved accountability of the church for the abuse of nuns and sisters.

== See also ==
- Religious institute (Catholic)
- Women's Ordination Conference
