= Marie Tranchepain =

Marie Tranchepain, also known as Marie St. Augustin (c. 1680–1733), was a French woman of the Order of St. Ursula and in 1727 sailed to New Orleans where she became the first Mother Superior of the Old Ursuline Convent. At that time, New Orleans was part of French Louisiana. She established the first school for girls in what is now the United States.

== Early life ==
Marie Tranchepain was born in ca. 1680 in Paris. Her father was a wealthy merchant who supplied the royal court at Versailles with luxury goods. The Tranchepains were Protestants who were able to practice their faith in France according to the Edict of Nantes (enacted by King Henry IV in 1598).

In 1685, though, they faced religious persecution when Louis XIV revoked the edict. The Tranchepains officially renounced their religion to avoid having their personal property seized by the state, being exiled, or sentenced to jail. However, they continued to secretly practice the faith. Tranchepain's father had to return to Rouen to claim the family estate after her uncle fled to Holland, otherwise it would have been seized by the state.

== Order of St. Ursula ==
In 1698, Tranchepain asked King Louis XIV to place her with the Order of St. Ursula (an enclosed religious order affiliated with the Catholic Church). Doing so, she was removed from her family. After a period as a novitiate, she became a nun in 1702, with the desire to be a missionary. The king paid the entrance fee to join the order and her living expenses until his death in 1715. Her living expenses were then paid by the Ursulines.

Nicolas-Ignace de Beaubois, a Jesuit priest and missionary, recruited Ursulines in Rouen to work at a New Orleans' military hospital. Tranchepain signed a contract with the French Company of the Indies stating that in exchange for the Ursuline's work at the hospital, a convent and girls' school would be established. Until they were financially self-reliant, the nuns would receive yearly allowances and they were to receive a plantation worked by enslaved Africans.

=== New Orleans ===
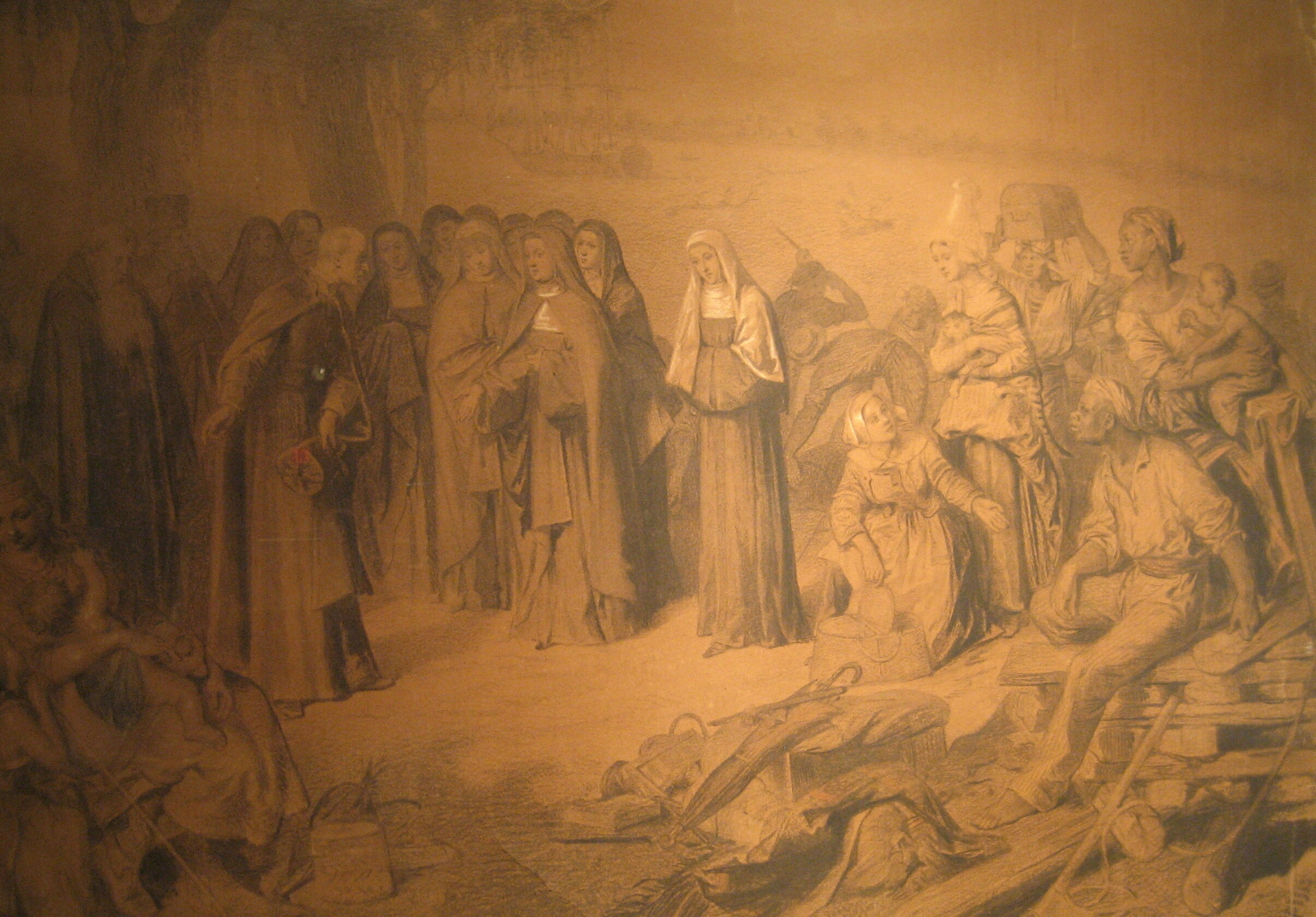
The Arrival of the Ursulines in America on August 7, 1727. Charcoal artwork by an unknown 19th century artist is on display at the Old Ursuline Convent, French Quarter, New Orleans

Tranchepain, called Mother Superior Mary Tranchepain de Augustine by Jean-Baptiste de La Croix de Chevrières de Saint-Vallier, the Bishop of Quebec, sailed on February 23, 1727 with ten other nuns across the Atlantic to New Orleans. (Note: Kostroun states that there were eleven other women, The account of the voyage published by Shea only lists the names of ten other nuns, leaving out Sister Jeanne Marion de St. Michel. Jeanne Marion along with Marie Anne Daen returned to France in November, 1727.) They traveled with Fathers Tartarin and Doutreleau. She documented the five-month arduous voyage in a report to her former Mother Superior in Rouen. During their extended period, Rev. Father Baubois oversaw the construction of their residence (Note: On page 13, the Company was said to have hired a house for the nuns.) and had begun to build the convent for the Ursulines who arrived by August 7, 1727, having been assumed to be lost due to their extended delay. They arrived nine years after the town of New Orleans was founded by Jean-Baptiste Le Moyne de Bienville.

Since the housing made available for the Ursulines was quite a distance from the military hospital, the nuns refused to work at the hospital until a convent was built next to the hospital. In the meantime, the Ursulines founded a convent on August 7, 1727 in New Orleans. They operated a school for free and enslaved African and Native American girls and women. They took in boarders and day students and taught them catechism.

In 1729, a Natchez revolt on Fort Rosalie left many children orphans, who were taken in by the Ursulines. Tranchepain died in November 1733 of an illness.

== Legacy ==
In 1734, the nuns moved into what is now called the Old Ursuline Convent. Now called the Ursuline Academy of New Orleans, it is the oldest school for girls in what is now the United States.

== Sources ==
- Shea, John Gilmary (1887). "Account of the voyage of the Ursulines to New Orleans in 1727". HathiTrust. s.n. Page numbers as printed in the document, versus the numbers in the page viewer.
- Jane Frances Heaney, O.S.U. A Century of Pioneering: A History of The Ursuline Nuns in New Orleans (1727-1827) New Orleans: The Ursuline Sisters of New Orleans, 1993.
- Ware, Marion (1960). "An Adventurous Voyage to French Colonial Louisiana; The Narrative of Mother Tranchepain, 1727". Louisiana History: The Journal of the Louisiana Historical Association. 1 (3): 212–229. ISSN 0024-6816. JSTOR 4230576.
