= Ursuline Academy (New Orleans) =

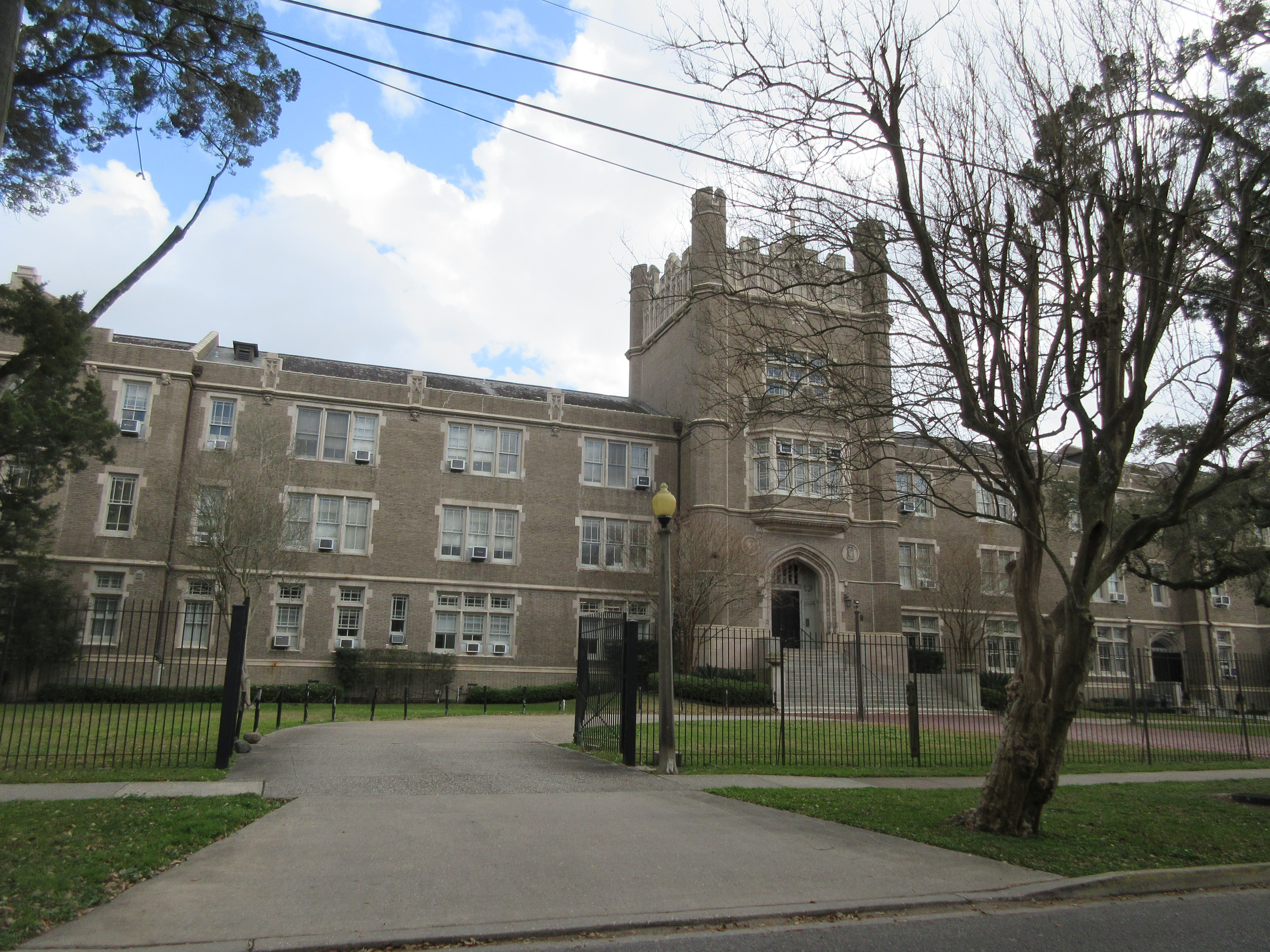

Location
- 2635 State Street; New Orleans, Louisiana 70118; United States; 29°56′27.5″N 90°6′48.27″W

Information
- Type: Private, All-Girls
- Motto: Serviam ("I will serve")
- Religious affiliation: Catholic
- Established: 1727; 299 years ago
- President: Laurie Eichelberger Leiva
- Teaching staff: 53.0 (FTE) (2019–20)
- Grades: T2–12
- Gender: Female
- Student to teacher ratio: 9.7 (2019–20)
- Colors: Navy and White
- Sports: Basketball, Volleyball, Softball, Golf, Swimming, Soccer, Cross Country, Dance, Cheer, Tennis, Track & Field, Indoor Track, Gymnastics
- Mascot: Lions
- Accreditation: Southern Association of Colleges and Schools
- Tuition: $12,585 + $1,850 fees = $14,435 (2023-24, high school)
- Principal (ES): Sue Heidel
- Principal(HS): Sue Heidel
- Website: www.uanola.org

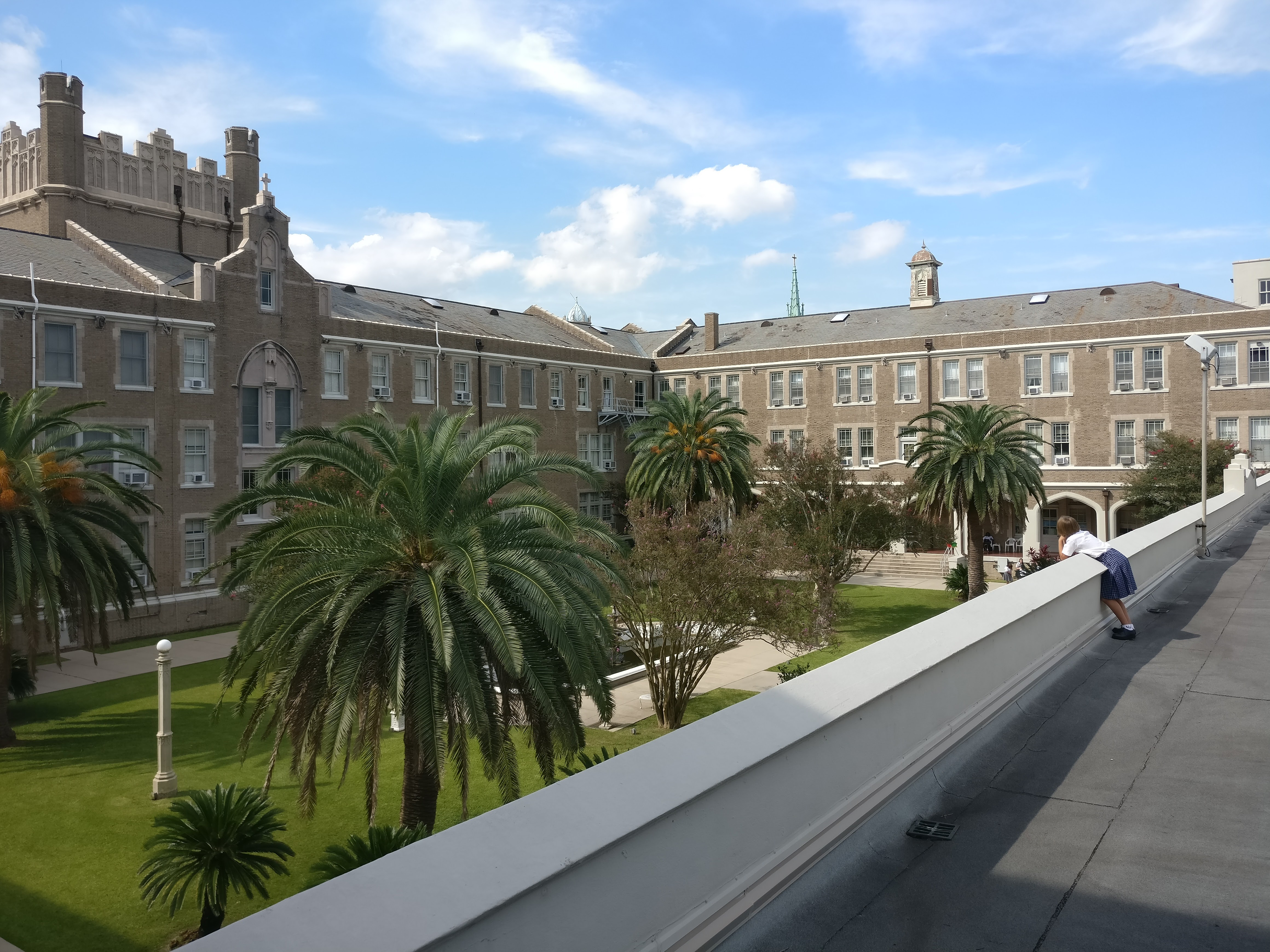
Courtyard

Ursuline Academy is a private, Catholic, all-girls high school and elementary school (Toddler 2 through 12th grade) in New Orleans, Louisiana, United States. It is located within the Archdiocese of New Orleans and under the trusteeship of the Ursuline Sisters of the New Orleans Community, part of the Ursuline Central Province of North America. Founded in 1727, the Academy is the oldest Catholic school and the oldest school for women in the United States.

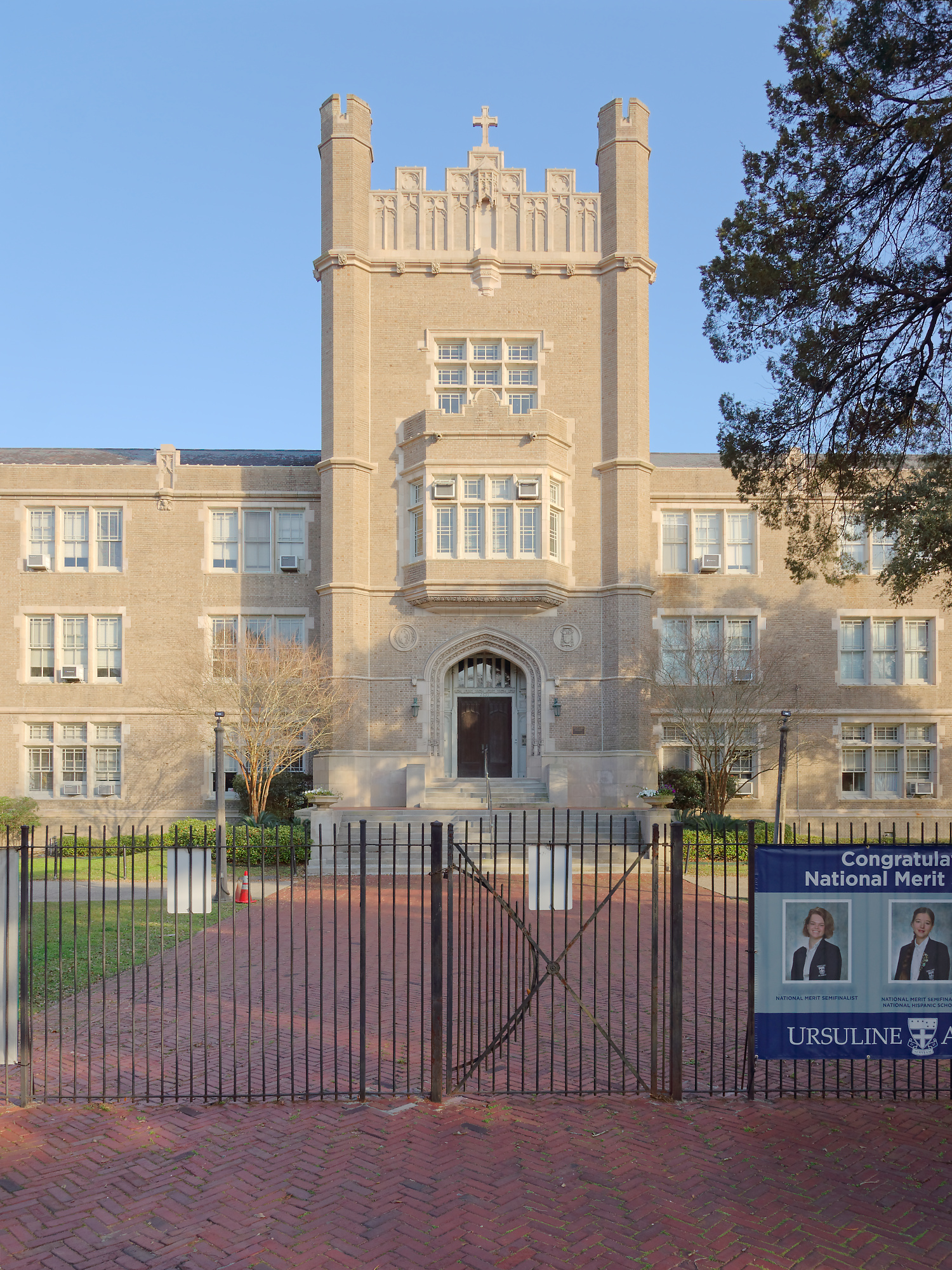
Ursuline Academy main entrance

== History ==
The Ursuline Academy was founded in 1727 by the Sisters of the Order of Saint Ursula, in New Orleans. It is the oldest continuously-operating school for girls, and the oldest Catholic school in the United States.

The Academy included the first convent, the first free school, and the first retreat center for ladies. It offered the first classes for female African-American slaves, free women of color, and Native Americans.

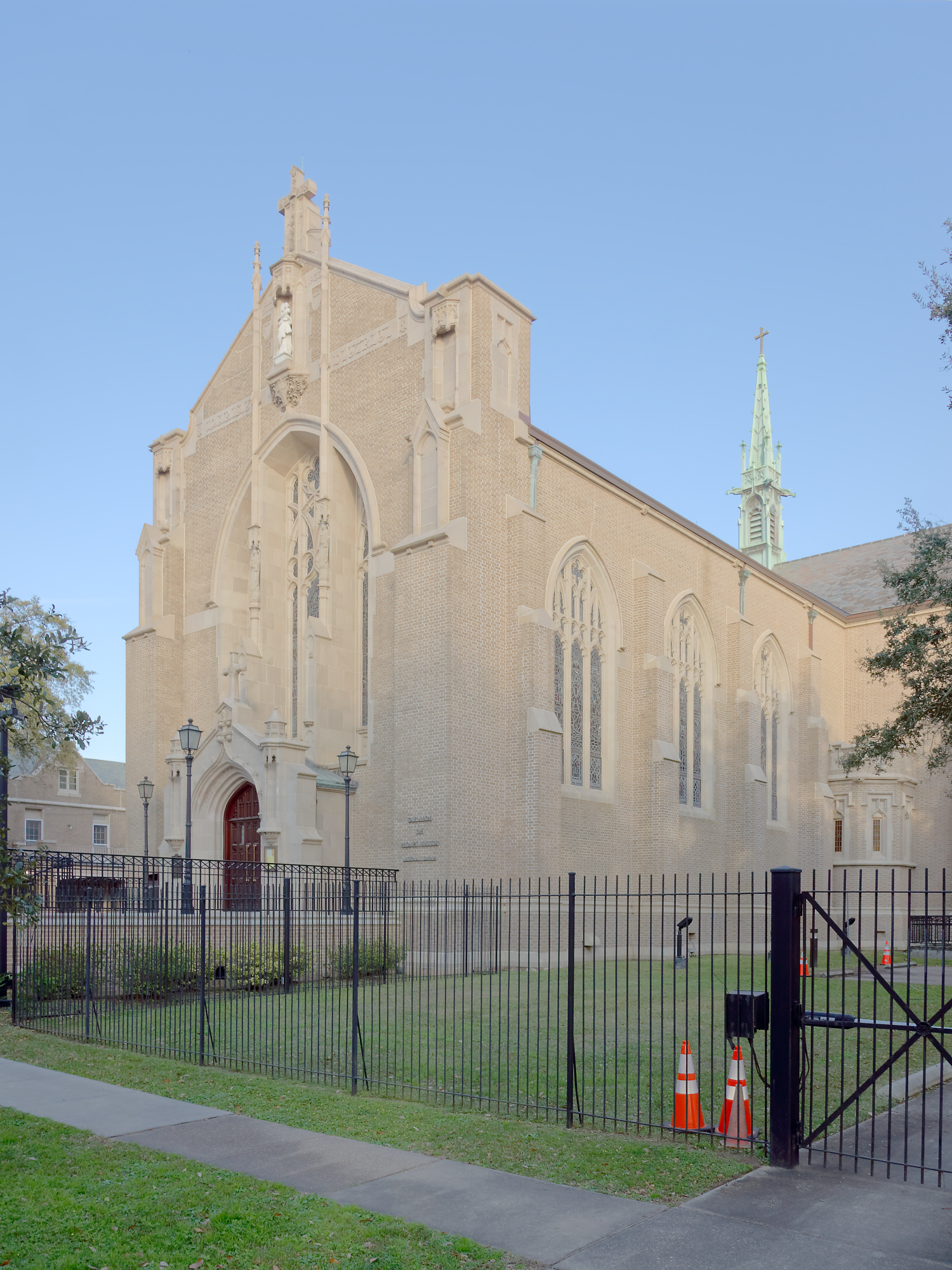
National Shrine of Our Lady of Prompt Succor, on the Ursuline campus

== Academics ==
An Ursuline education is based on the philosophy of Saint Angela Merici.

== Traditions ==
Rally began in 1948 as a way for classes to show their school spirit in the areas of volleyball intramurals, through skits, posters, songs, and cheers. Each class was given a name (Skip, Mac, Leprechaun or Sioux (now Phoenix)) to replace existing sororities on campus and carried them until they graduated and passed them on to a little sister class.

== Athletics ==
Ursuline Academy athletics competes in the LHSAA.

== Notable alumnae ==
- Lurita Doan, administrator of the U.S. General Services Administration
- Mary Landrieu, US Senator
- E'myri Crutchfield, actress
- Dana Gourrier, actress

== See also ==
- History of the Ursulines in New Orleans

== Notes ==
- Clark, Emily, ed. (2009). Voices from an Early American Convent: Marie Madeleine Hachard and the New Orleans Ursulines, 1727–1760. Baton Rouge, La.: Louisiana State University Press. ISBN 978-0-8071-3446-7. OCLC 824539478.
